= Mehal Sefari =

Specialized military unit of the Ethiopian Empire

- Active: 1850–1936
- Country: Ethiopian Empire
- Branch: Army
- Type: Infantry, cavalry, snipers, rapid deployment
- Role: Multi-role, Imperial Bodyguard, cadre for larger Imperial Host
- Size: 5 combat units roughly of brigade size
- Part of: Imperial Fitawrari (Commander-in-Field)
- Garrison/HQ: Ankober, Addis Ababa
- Nickname: Mehal Sefari
- Patron: Emperor of Ethiopia
- Engagements: First Italo-Ethiopian War: Battle of Amba Alagi; Battle of Mekelle; Battle of Adwa; Second Italo-Ethiopian War

Commanders
- Commander in Chief: Atse (Emperor) of Ethiopia
- Notable commanders: Dedj Chacha; Dedj Beshah Aboye

Mehal Sefari (Amharic: መኻል ሰፋሪ) was the Ethiopian title for the specialized units of the imperial guard during the reign of Emperor Menelik II. The unit originated from Emperor Menelik II’s personal guard and has occasionally been associated in oral traditions with earlier elite troops serving under Emperor Tewodros II under Fitawrari Gebeyehu, an accomplished Ethiopian military commander and lord protector of the crown, though there is no documentary evidence confirming this connection. As Gebeyehu's military unit was among the last that remained loyal to Tewodros when most of his army left, the assumption is not unreasonable if not conclusive. The title "Mehal Sefari" however was not used by any of Tewodros' units, nor by any other previous military unit. The title translates to "center campers" and alludes to the location the unit encamped in Menelik's expeditionary encampments. This organizational pattern echoed the older Ethiopian tradition of the kätäma, a mobile royal camp that served as both court and military headquarters: “The centre of power was at the time without fixed capital and the seat of the moving capital was known as kätäma.” Some have also suggested that the unit was used to come between (mehal) battling armies of the nobility; however, no historical sources substantiate this claim, as military engagements among nobles typically required imperial sanction. Aleme Eshete observes that “the ‘Mahal Safari’ movement may be taken as the first signal that alerted the Ethiopian Government of a Bolshevik-type popular movement,” indicating that the term later took on broader political connotations.

== History ==
=== Personal guard of Prince Menelik ===
The Mehal Sefari's earlier roles were providing security for young Prince Menelik under the leadership of the later Dejazmach Germame. Upon the death of Atse Tewodros, 3 men – Wagshum Gobeze of Welo, Kassa Mircha of Tigre and Menelik of Shoa – were declared Atse. Kassa marched on Welo, defeated and imprisoned Gobeze, he marched south to Shewa to face Menelik who had gathered his forces and awaited him. Both rulers assumptive, Yohannes by virtue of arms left for him by the British and Menelik by blood sought reconciliation, Menelik agreeing to accept Yohannes as his Suzerain, much to the relief of the latter whose small, though well-armed forces were no match for the Shewan Army. Menelik's Army, though with fewer artillery pieces, had superiority in men, equipment and mounted cavalry. It would also have been fighting on home turf. Yohannes' spy sent to observe the Shoans is said to have come back to tell the Emperor "I thought clouds had descended on the ground, but it was the Shoans and their multitudes in their tents."

Atse Menelik took this opportunity to continue to arm and train his men, dispatching men to the South and West in poses of providing security for the Emperor of Ethiopia and an elite infantry division.

=== Reconstitution and further activity ===
Though Richard Pankhurst dates the creation of the Imperial Bodyguard (then known as the Mehal Sefari) to 1917, there is ample documentation including eyewitness accounts of the charge of the Mehal Sefari after Gebeyehu (their commanders) death. The Mehal Sefari were also involved in protecting the ailing Emperor Menelik as his grandson, Eyasu, attempted to remove his grandfather from his palace by force. Pankhurst may be writing about the Regent Ras Tafari (later Emperor Haile Selassie I) reconstituting the unit under his direct control from men who had trained in the British army in Kenya, as well as a few who had served under the Italians in Tripoli. In 1930, the Regent invited a Belgian military mission to train and modernize the Ethiopian military, which included the Kebur Zabagna. The unit was organized in three battalions of trained regular infantry armed with rifles, machine guns and mortars; one battalion consisted of men from the earlier Mehal Sefari. The new Mehal Sefari was involved in the power struggle between Ras then later Negus Teferi on one hand and Menelik's nobles notably Fitawrari Habtegiorgis on the other. Teferi had by then co-opted the Mehal safari to the point where out of concern for Empress Zewditu Habtegiorgis ordered his 18,000-man person army into action surrounding the Mehal Sefari and other units loyal to the regent. The issue was laid to rest when the Empress interceded with the Imperial Fitwarari whose forces had cornered Negus Teferi with a few of his men in his home and were preparing to make short work of them. The Kebur Zabagna also had one heavy machine gun company. It was commanded by Ethiopian graduates of Saint Cyr, the French military academy, at the time of the Italian invasion of Ethiopia. As a unit, the Imperial Bodyguard only participated in the Battle of Maychew (31 March 1936), but afterwards many of its members joined the various groups of the Ethiopian resistance.

Following the return of Emperor Haile Selassie to Ethiopia in 1941, the Kebur Zabagna was reconstituted, and a Swedish military mission aided in its training. Men for the Kagnew Battalion, which fought in the Korean War, were drawn from the Imperial Bodyguard.

== 1960 attempted coup and disbandment ==
"It remained the elite force of the empire," notes historian Bahru Zewde, "until discredited in the wake of the attempted coup of 1960." That unsuccessful coup had been planned by its commander Brigadier-General Mengistu Neway, and his brother Germame Neway. In 1961, it numbered nine battalions; in 1969 some 7,000 men. In 1974, the Commander was Major-General Tafessa Lemma. The Kebur Zabagna was disbanded after the Derg consolidated their hold on Ethiopia.

After the Imperial Bodyguard attempted to overthrow the Emperor in 1962 its most lethal element, the Berari Neber whose paratroopers had just completed training and received their wings from the Emperor a bare 2 months earlier were separated and attached to the regular army. The men selected out of the Berari-Nebir were responsible for the anti-hijack program. The Anti-Hijack program interdicted about 4 hijack attempts. In the most famous one of these was in 1972 when Wallelign Mekonnen with ELF (Eritrean Liberation Front) trained operatives led a 3 man 2 women cell in an abortive attempt to hijack an Ethiopian airlines Boeing 707. They reportedly smuggled 1 grenade and 1 handgun on the plane in the women's underpants. Ethiopian anti-Hijack commandos shot and killed two hijackers and the rest were killed by a bomb they set off.

== Structure ==
It was part of the organizational structure of the Ethiopian regular army as one of the 4 divisions that comprised the regular army. The Ethiopian Imperial Host included the 40,000 men and women of the Regular Army and the approximately 100,000 men and women of the National Guard/Biherawi Tor/. The 1st Division or Kebur Zabagna (as it was later reconstituted under Emperor Haile Selassie) was based at Addis Ababa. It was divided into 4 battalions with the 2nd battalion charged with its primary tasking, protection of the person of the Emperor. The 2nd Battalion had an infantry and cavalry regiment based out of Menelik and Jubilee Palaces as well as the soccer stadium in the Lagare area. The other 3 battalions incorporated its marching band, an elite airborne regiment Berari Neber or flying tigers, a medical corps and staff of its own hospital and a headquarters corps. It roughly numbered about 10,000 during the reign of Haile Selassie I.
