= Abebe Aregai =

Ethiopian military commander; Prime Minister of Ethiopia from 1957 to 1960

Ras Abebe Aregai
- አበበ አረጋይ
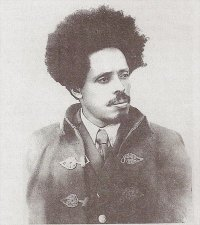
- Aregai in 1949

Prime Minister of Ethiopia
- In office 27 November 1957 – 17 December 1960
- Monarch: Haile Selassie I
- Preceded by: Makonnen Endelkachew
- Succeeded by: Imru Haile Selassie (acting)

Minister of Defence
- In office 1955 – 17 December 1960
- Prime Minister: Makonnen Endelkachew; Abebe Aregai
- Preceded by: Abiye Abebe (Minister of War)
- Succeeded by: Merid Mengesha

Minister of the Interior
- In office 1949–1955
- Prime Minister: Makonnen Endelkachew
- Preceded by: Position established
- Succeeded by: Mesfin Sileshi

Minister of War
- In office 1947–1949
- Prime Minister: Makonnen Endelkachew
- Preceded by: Birru Walda Gabriel
- Succeeded by: Abiye Abebe

Governor of Tigray
- In office 1943–1947
- Preceded by: Haile Selassie Gugsa; Seyoum Mengesha (Tigray)
- Succeeded by: Seyoum Mengesha

Governor of Sidamo
- In office 1941–1942
- Preceded by: Pietro Gazzera (Fascist Governor)
- Succeeded by: Adefresew Yinadu

Lord Mayor of Addis Ababa
- In office 1941–1941
- Preceded by: Agenor Frangipani (Fascist Governor)
- Succeeded by: Takele Woldehawariat

Personal details
- Born: 18 August 1903 Woira Amba-Jirru, Shewa, Ethiopian Empire
- Died: 17 December 1960 (aged 57) Guenete Leul Palace, Addis Ababa, Ethiopian Empire
- Party: Independent

Ras Abebe Aregai (Amharic: አበበ አረጋይ; 18 August 1903 – 17 December 1960) was an Ethiopian military commander who served as Prime Minister of Ethiopia from 27 November 1957 until his death. He was a victim of the unsuccessful 1960 Ethiopian coup.

During the Italian occupation, he led a group of resistance fighters. They were collectively known as the Arbegnoch (lit. 'Patriots'), and operated in Menz. The British IWM labeled Abebe “one of the bravest men in the modern world.”

== Early life ==
Abebe was born on 18 August 1903 in the village of Woira Amba-Jirru in northern Shewa. His father was Aregai Bechere, an ethnic Amhara, and his mother was Askale Gobena, an ethnic Oromo and the daughter of Ras Gobena Dacche. He served in the Kebur Zabagna, rising to the rank of Major before transferring to the police, and by 1935 had been granted the title of Balambaras. He was the chief of police of Addis Ababa when the Italians invaded Ethiopia in 1936.

== Resistance against the Italians ==
Balambaras Abebe remained in the capital after the departure of Emperor Haile Selassie, but departing for the northeast with ten men before the Italians occupied the capital. He took part in the unsuccessful attempt to retake the capital in July of that year, and his soldiers almost reached the Imperial Palace before being beaten back by two Italian battalions.

After this action, Abebe's activities are hard to follow due to contradictory evidence. This is due in large part to the reticence of the survivors in their memoirs about individuals and events: when Emperor Haile Selassie proclaimed a general amnesty upon his restoration, as Thomas L. Kane explains, "many of those who served the Italians loyally right up to the last minute took advantage of this proclamation to escape punishment, and ... [often achieved] positions of power.... In order to avoid offending one of these figures, or even the loyal relatives of some collaborator, the name of a principal in some incident will be deliberately omitted, though some reason such as 'this would be a humiliation for Ethiopia' may be given."

According to Anthony Mockler, by the spring of 1937 year Abebe was left with only 40 men, forcing him to limit his activities to the mountainous region of Menz. However, Thomas Kane writes that after Lij Haile Maryam Mammo's victory at Morit on 21 April 1937, Abebe and Fitawrari Zawdu Abba Koran took control of Morat and Geru, then on 25 July the three joined with Blatta Tekle Walde-Hawaryat and Major Mesfin Sleshi for an attack on Addis Alem; however they encountered the enemy far to the east of their intended target, and increasing enemy forces and aerial bombardments forced them to withdraw to Menz 1 September. Returning to Mockler's narrative, in May 1937 Abebe ventured out of Menz to proclaim Meleke Tsahai, the 16-year-old son of the late Lij Iyasu emperor at the Three Ambas, alarming the Italian occupiers. (Kane does agree with Mockler that Abebe did cooperate with Meleke Tsahai, meeting with him 27 November.) On 1 June, General Ugo Cavallero moved north to surround Abebe, and keep him from returning to Menz, and although Abebe made three unsuccessful attempts to break through the Italian lines before the rainy season, after the rains his Arbegnoch were able to return to the comparative safety of Menz.

Although Meleke Tsahai died not long afterwards of illness, Abebe remained at large, and following the death of Olana Dingili (1939), became the leading rebel leader – although one not entirely trusted by the exiled Emperor Haile Selassie. Abebe presented himself to the Italians as ambivalent about his role as an Arbegna, always seeming to be at the point of submitting to the occupiers in return for money, arms, honors or power, yet always changing his mind at the last moment. "In negotiations he conducted with General Nasi, then deputy viceroy and governor of Shewa, Abebe gave intimations of his readiness to surrender. Simultaneously, he wrote to other patriotic leaders explaining the actual reason for engaging in the talks: to buy time. After he had made sure that his forces had sufficiently recovered from the reverses they had suffered in the preceding months, he broke off negotiations, using as a pretext the killing by the Italians of patriots in another locality." The Italians continued these talks, obsessed with the hope of recruiting the best-known resistance fighter to their side, until 15 March 1940, when General Nasi learned that Abebe Aregai, who had promised to take the oath of allegiance if the General would make a visit to his location in person, was laying an ambush for him with 20,000 men.

It was not until Emperor Haile Selassie returned to Ethiopia that he was let in on the secret. As the Emperor entered Addis Ababa with his entourage, the streets were lined with Abebe's men, cheering their returning Emperor. Abebe presented himself and his son to the Emperor, and Mockler reports that the Arbegna told Emperor Haile Selassie, bowing low before him, "I am your loyal subject. I never submitted to the enemy. I never hoped to see you alive again and I am grateful to God for this day, when I have seen the sun shine."

== Later career ==
Now Ras, Abebe Aregai proved to be a valuable retainer to the Emperor. One of the few Arbegnoch to receive a major government post, Ras Abebe was appointed governor of Addis Ababa and Minister of War in 1941 soon after Haile Selassie's return. He was subsequently made governor of Sidamo province from 1941 to 1942. When the Woyane rebellion broke out in Tigray in 1942, with the rebels under Fitawrari Yeebio Weldai of Enderta known popularly as "Wedi Weldai" at one point capturing Mek'ele, Ras Abebe marched north to suppress the violence with the help of British air power, and captured the rebel headquarters at Wukro on 17 October 1943. The Emperor subsequently made him governor of Tigray, and Ras Abebe brutally pacified the province. After serving as governor, Ras Abebe once again served as Minister of War (1947–1949), Minister of the Interior (1949–1955), and Minister of Defence before becoming prime minister.

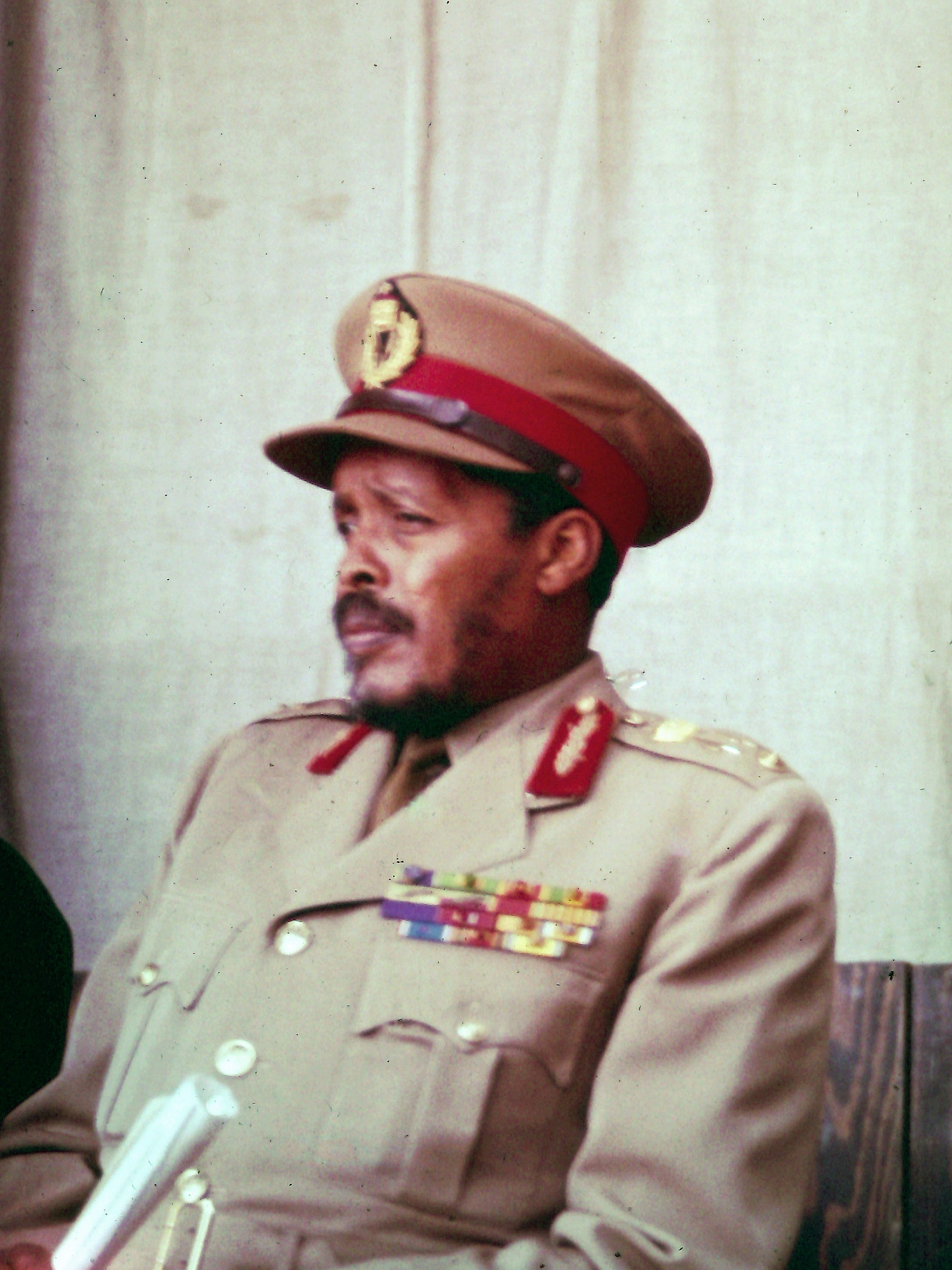
Ras Abebe Aregai. Picture taken December 1959, at the inauguration of Building College in Addis Ababa, Ethiopia.

By the late 1950s, he had become the leader of one of the major factions that vied for the Emperor's favor; the others were led by potentiates who included Mekonnen Habte-Wold (brother of Aklilu Habte-Wold), Ras Andargachew Masai and General Mulugeta Bulli.

=== Coup and assassination ===
Brothers Mengistu Neway and Germame, supported by the Imperial Bodyguard and the government security force, seized control of the capital on 13 December 1960. Ras Abebe was taken hostage along with others. The rest of the military, however, remained loyal to the Emperor, and rushed to Addis Ababa and crushed the coup. Many of the hostages, including Ras Abebe, were killed by machine-gun fire as the army stormed the Genetta Leul palace on 17 December. Although the leaders of the coup had fled, most of them did not outlive the Ras by more than a week.

== See also ==
- List of kidnappings (1960–1969)
