= 1974 Ethiopian coup d'état =

Coup d'état against Ethiopian Emperor Haile Selassie by the Derg

- Part of the Cold War and Ethiopian Revolution
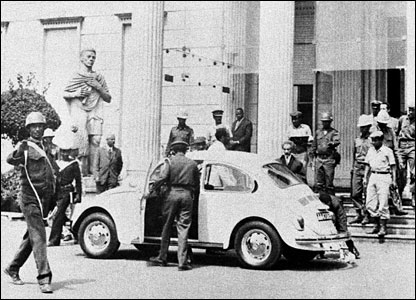
- Emperor Haile Selassie (above rear window) being removed from the Jubilee Palace on 12 September 1974, marking his deposition by the coup d'état and the assumption of power by the Derg.
Date	12 September 1974; 51 years ago
Location	Addis Ababa, Ethiopia
Result	Coup successful: Emperor Haile Selassie is captured and imprisoned; Rise of the Derg; Beginning of the civil war

Belligerents
Ethiopian Empire	Coordinating Committee of the Armed Forces, Police and Territorial Army

Commanders and leaders
(Ethiopian Empire) Haile Selassie; (Ethiopian Empire) Mikael Imru	(Derg) Aman Andom; (Derg) Atnafu Abate; (Derg) Mengistu Haile Mariam

On 12 September 1974, Emperor Haile Selassie was deposed by the Coordinating Committee of the Armed Forces, Police, and Territorial Army, a military junta that consequently ruled Ethiopia as the Derg until 28 May 1991.

In February 1974, the Ethiopian Revolution was accompanied by mutinies of units of the Imperial Army, which were ignited over resentment of low payment. The Derg established the Coordinating Council of the Armed Forces in June 1974, and grew rapidly to topple the ministers of Haile Selassie under Prime Minister Endelkachew Makonnen. Upon deposing the emperor, many of his personages and Imperial family members fled to London like Crown Prince Asfaw Wossen. On 27 March 1975, the Derg officially abolished the monarchy and the Ethiopian Empire as a whole, and began implementing a Marxist-Leninist system, along with nationalizing all properties. Haile Selassie died on 27 August, with different sources attributing his death to strangulation by the order of the military government or natural causes during a prostate operation.

== Background ==
A semi-feudal mode of production was a major characteristic of the Ethiopian Empire's economy for a number of centuries. The land – which was the most essential mode of production – had been amassed by the church (over 25%), Emperor Haile Selassie and his family (20%), the feudal lords (30%) and the state (18%), leaving a mere 7% to the roughly 23 million Ethiopian peasants.

The landless peasants lost as much as 75% of their produce to their landlords. In the late 18th and early 19th century, the supply of slave labor for agriculture was commonplace and the landless tenants suffered from miserable lives; any tenant who would not voluntarily provide the nominal service was considered a rebel and was subsequently jailed, flogged, or otherwise punished.

During the reign of Emperor Haile Selassie, he promised the country to follow democracy and bring modernization, such as by introducing the 1931 and 1955 Constitutions.

Haile Selassie faced severe backlash and a negative public reputation, largely because of overtaxing in Gojjam starting in 1930, the famine of Wollo and Tigray in 1958, and autocratic land seizure. On 13 December 1960, a military coup d'état attempt occurred in Addis Ababa's Guenete Leul Palace by opposition groups, including Germame Neway and Mengistu Neway, after Haile Selassie went on a state visit to Brazil. Although it failed, this coup was considered as the initial point of student movements against the Haile Selassie government. In February 1965, students from Addis Ababa University marched in the streets under slogan "Land for the Tiller", demanding land reform and distribution. Along with combinations of armed resistance movements in Eritrea in the early 1960s and some Ethiopian provinces in Bale, Gojjam and Tigray, Haile Selassie's government was overwhelmed by the early 1970s. In 1973, severe drought killed 100,000 people in Wollo and Tigray, which notably degraded his public image.

In February 1974, mutinies broke out in the military over low payment and secessionist conflicts in Eritrea.

== Events ==
In June 1974, the Derg, as it would later be known, was established as the Coordinating Committee of the Armed Forces, Police and Territorial Army. In less than three months, it rapidly grew enough to topple the Endelkachew Mekonnen cabinet.

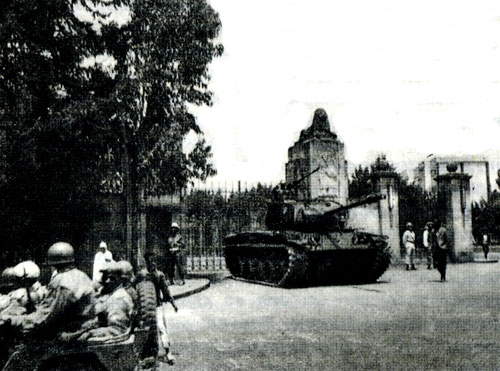
Tank at the gates of the imperial palace

On 12 September 1974, Haile Selassie was imprisoned by a group of police officers under the Coordinating Committee. The 58-year-old former crown prince Asfaw Wossen, along with many patronages of the emperor, were exiled to London. On 23 November, the Massacre of the Sixty took place, in which 60 officials of Haile Selassie government, including two former prime ministers, were executed by firing squad in Kerchele Prison. The execution was heard over Ethiopian Radio in the next day; the council also included General Aman Andom, one of the leaders of the coup, and Haile Selassie's grandson, Admiral Iskinder Desta. Further executed people at this time included roughly 200 former cabinet ministers, government officials, provincial governors, and judges who were held in the cellars of the National Palace awaiting trial on charges of corruption and maladministration.

Inspired by Marxist-Leninist policy, the Coordinating Committee abolished the semi-feudal system and implemented a nationalized system. On 21 March 1975, the Derg formally abolished the Ethiopian Empire, along with all imperial titles. On 27 August 1975, Haile Selassie died in a small apartment inside his palace at the age of 83. Official sources attributed his death to natural causes caused by a prostate operation, but later evidence emerged that suggested he was killed by strangulation in his bed by the order of the military government.
