= Gibreab Teferi =

Ethiopian activist, poet and playwright (1923–1988)

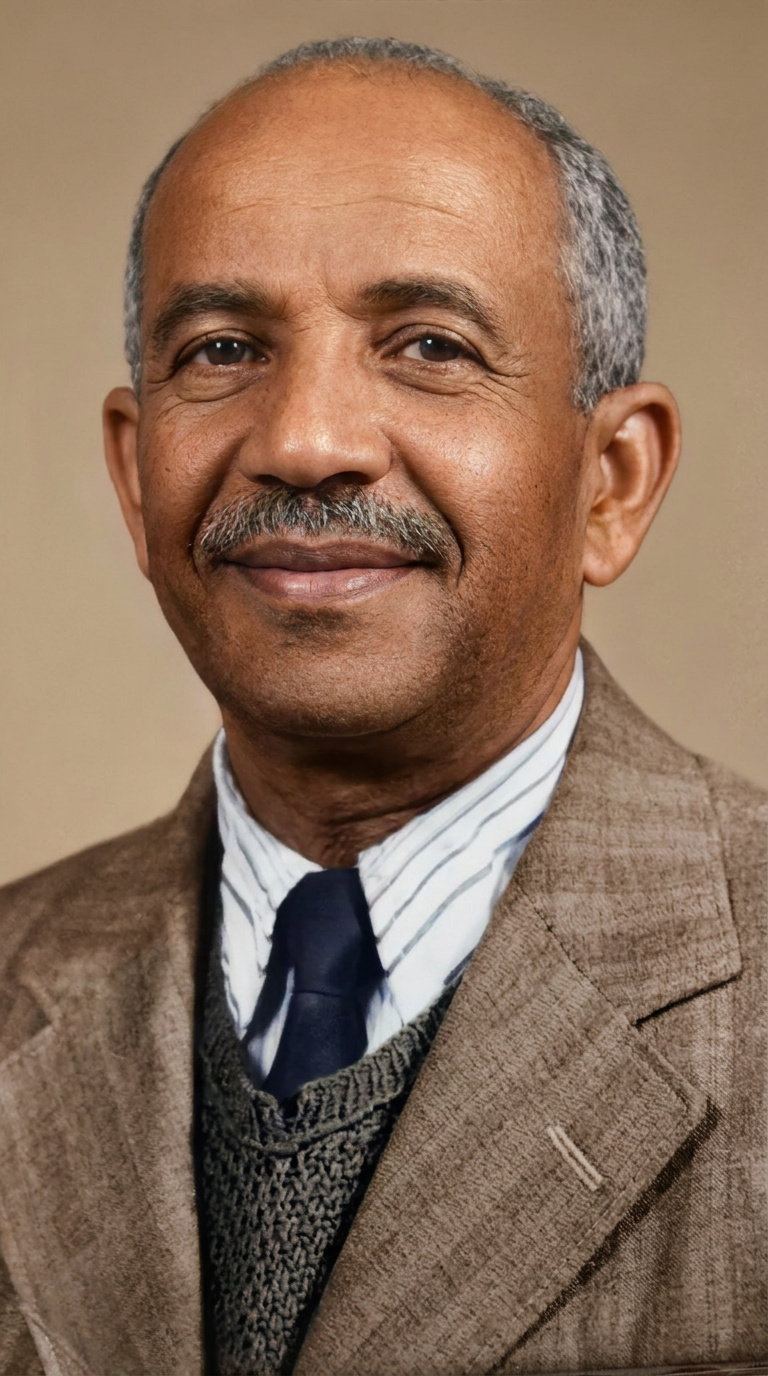
- Gibreab Teferi Desta
- Born: 1923; Bure Damot, Gojam Province*, Ethiopian Empire
- Died: 15 January 1988 (aged 64–65); Addis Ababa, Ethiopia
- Resting place: Holy Trinity Cathedral, Addis Ababa, Ethiopia
- Occupations: Playwright; poet; musician; lyricist

Signature
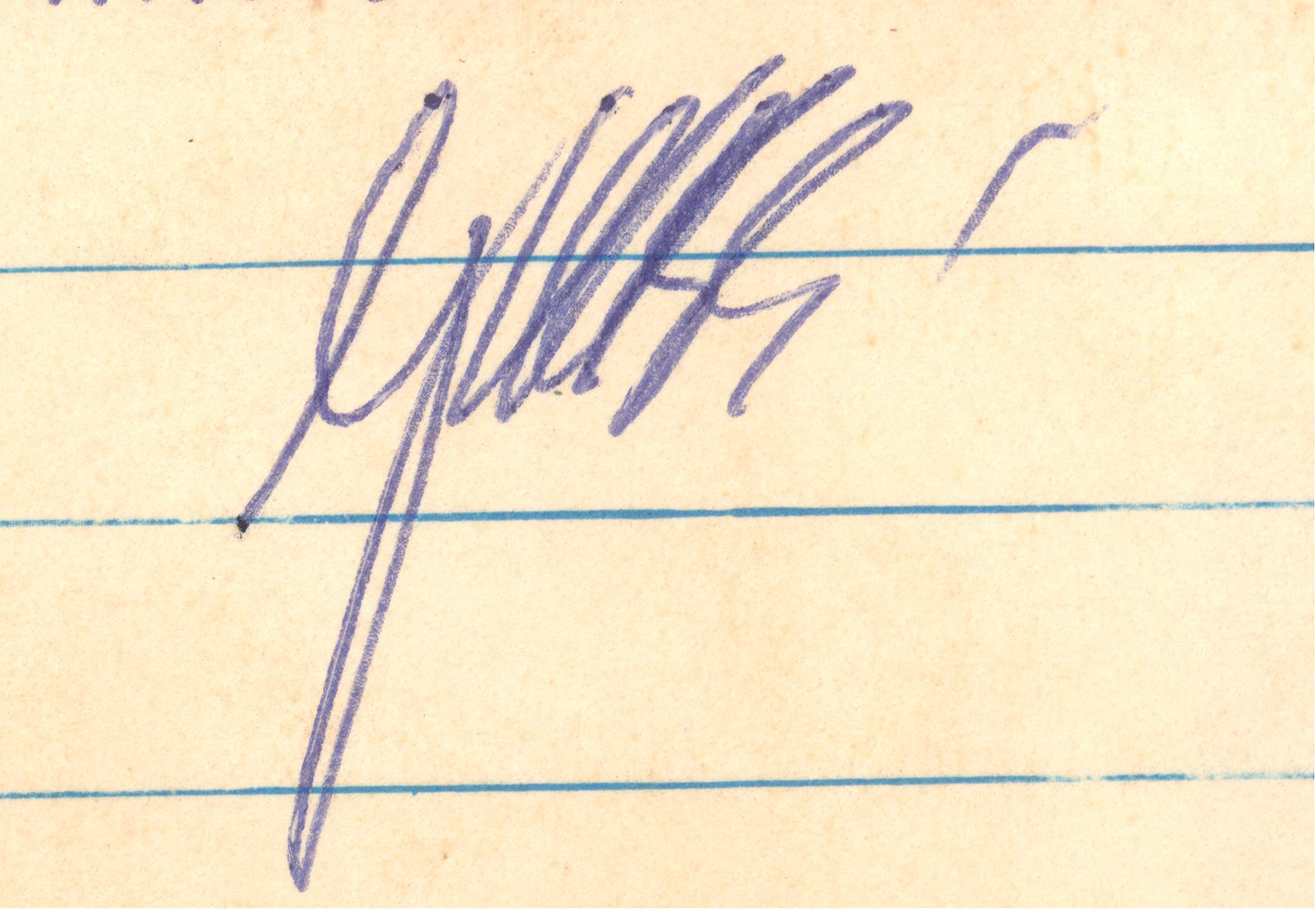

Gibreab Teferi Dasta (Amharic: ግብረአብ ተፈሪ ደስታ; 1923 – 15 January 1988), also spelled Gebreab Teferi, was an Ethiopian activist, poet and playwright known for his extensive knowledge of the Ge’ez and Amharic languages.

Gibreab died aged 65 in Addis Ababa. He was one of the early pioneers of Ethiopian music and Theater. He was a poet, lyricist, and playwright who wrote over two-hundred songs, dozen plays, and hundreds of poems in the Amharic language. Gibreab's patriotism as can be seen in many of his songs and plays. He also worked as a journalist, author, musician, composer and theater director. He wrote several unpublished plays, thousands of songs, and was in the process of publishing a book of plays and poems when he died in 1988. He also served in the Imperial Army (Amharic: ˈክቡር ዘበኛ), rising to the rank of Shalaqa-Basha and was the primary Amharic lyricist for the Ras Band in the Ras Hotel, eventually becoming management there, where he worked until retirement.

== Life ==
Gibreab Teferi was born in 1923 in the Bure Damot region of Gojjam Province to his father, the Commander of the Right Brigade, Qenyazmach Teferi Dasta, and his mother, Weyzero Semagne Tasama. Gibreab was married to Yeshimebet Aregaye. He fathered ten children – four boys and six girls.

=== Early life ===
Gibreab's parents separated when he was just nine months old. He was raised by his aunt, who lived in the same region. Gibreab received primary education in the traditional schools of the area, learning to read and write through the church. He became known for his fast learning skills in Ge'ez. He studied under the tutelage of Aleka Teffera. Teffera had an affinity for music that he shared with his young student. Teffera had once been a high-ranking member of a musical group in Emperor Menelik's court in Addis Ababa. He taught young Gibreab many of the songs and lyrics in praise of Addis Ababa.

Gibreab made his first journey to Addis Ababa when he was a mere ten years old. Having graduated from the church school in his village, he went to the capital city to apply for a deaconship. He later described his first impressions: "As compared with the countryside, Arada (the current Piazza) was lovely, a paradise. Everything I saw was thrilling and attractive…It might surprise you if I tell you that when I first saw the mounted statue of Menelik, I almost ran away thinking that the horse would descend upon me and squash me like a fly! It was in stages that I got used to it!"

While in Addis Ababa, Gibreab stayed near St. George's Cathedral, continuing to learn music (although in a way that was not, perhaps, traditional): He was begging for food, as was the custom for young students at the time, when a waitress offered him a meal. As he was eating, he heard azmari accompanied by a krar, singing a beautiful song. He was so transfixed by the melody that the song become embedded in his mind (Telahoun).

After two weeks in Addis Ababa, the young Gibreab returned to his village home of Gojjam to continue his studies there. He was forced to quit his education in 1937, during the Second Italo-Ethiopian War. During the five-year occupation by Italy, Gibreab served with his uncle, Dagazmach Zalaka Dasta in Gojjam, in the Kola Dega Damot region. He became a resistance fighter in Arbegnoch movement, creating the coarse, wool, blanket-like garments for the anti-fascist rebels and a fighter. Even in this situation his passion for music kept growing.

=== Kebur Zabagna ===
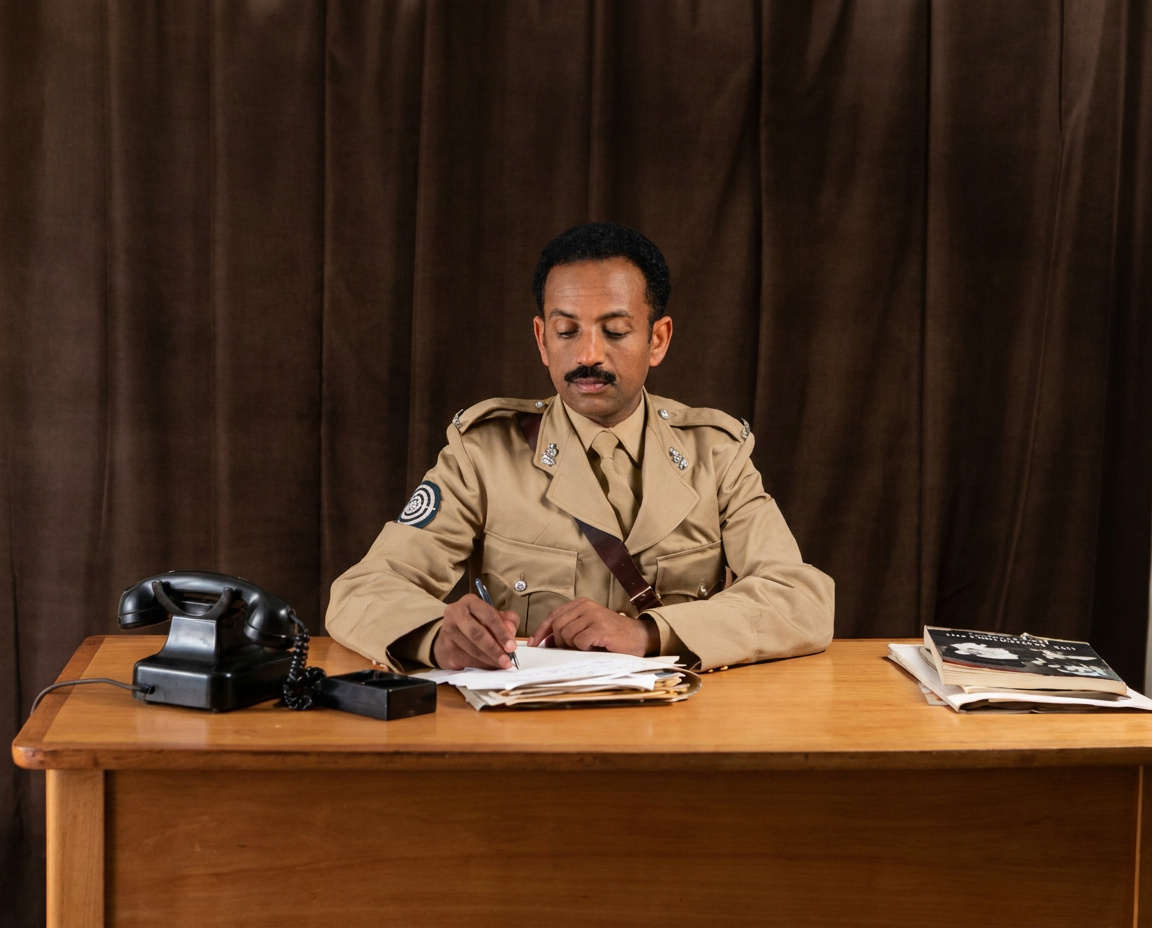
At Kebur Zebegna writing plays

In 1945, Gibreab returned to Addis Ababa to find a city much changed from his previous visit 12 years prior. He told Melese Talahoun, the city had "changed a lot; practically nothing was as it used to be. Everything was mixed-up." He had become a deacon in St. George's Cathedral and was in the city looking for a job. He came upon an employment postings for the Imperial Army, he was young and energetic and qualified to be an Imperial Army. Since Gibreab knows how to read and write, in his spare time he started writing plays and lyrics, it's this that lead to the creation of the theatric and musical department of the Imperial army.

During his tenure with the Kebur Zabagna, Gibreab wrote several plays, many as a source of education for the soldiers; his first play to be performed in the military was "Don't forget your military duty", which encourages the soldiers to be clean, honorable, and presentable. Years before the Kebur Zabagna created a theatrical department in 1949, Gibreab's plays were performed by the men; just like Shakespearean actors, some men wore dresses and played the role of women. Gibreab also wrote many lyrics for the Kebur Zabagna band and most of his lyrics were performed by the band's famous artists which includes Tilahun Gessesse, Tefera Kasa, Bizunesh Bekele, and many more. His work lives on, because, even today, those same lyrics are performed by the famous Kebur Zabagna artists and are appreciated and enjoyed by many Ethiopians.

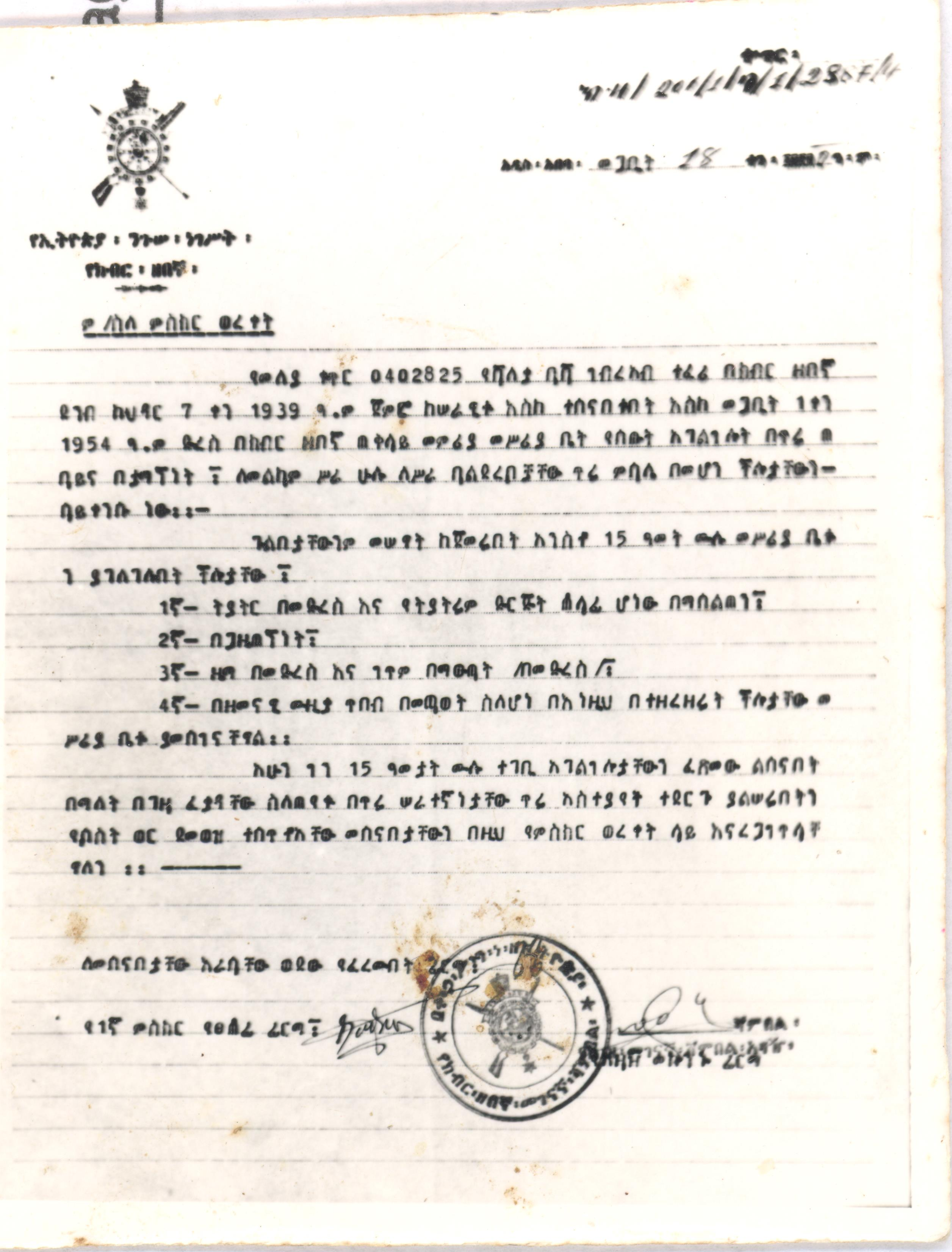
Resignation Letter From Kebur Zabagna

In 1956, when the Yugoslavian president Marshal Tito visited Ethiopia, the higher officials were afraid to give a presentation in front of Emperor Haile Selassie and Martial Tito. Then, was given to Gibreab to welcome, introduce the army and the day's program, Gibreab gladly went onstage and gave a military salute and presented the program well. The king and higher officials were very impressed by his presentation. His family still has the picture of him giving speech on that historical day.

He also worked for Takele Ena Sarawitu, the Imperial Army's radio and newspaper department, where he worked as a journalist and writer. Gibreab reached the rank of Shalaqa-Basha (commander of the Colonel) before leaving the Imperial Guard in 1954. He received many awards for his ethics, loyalty, and service to his country.

==== Plays ====
Gibreab wrote several plays, both during and after his time with the Kebur Zabagna. Some of these plays were never performed; others received recognition from military and government officials. One of Gibreab's most admirable talents was his ability to write plays in dramatic verse. His plays contained poetry and many hidden meanings. Like the English William Shakespeare, Gibreab also adapted ancient tales into modern plays. One play, Astyages The Cruel Leader, tells the tale of Astyages, the last king of the Median Empire (in modern-day Iran). This play, written in dramatic verse, was first published as a book in Ethiopia.

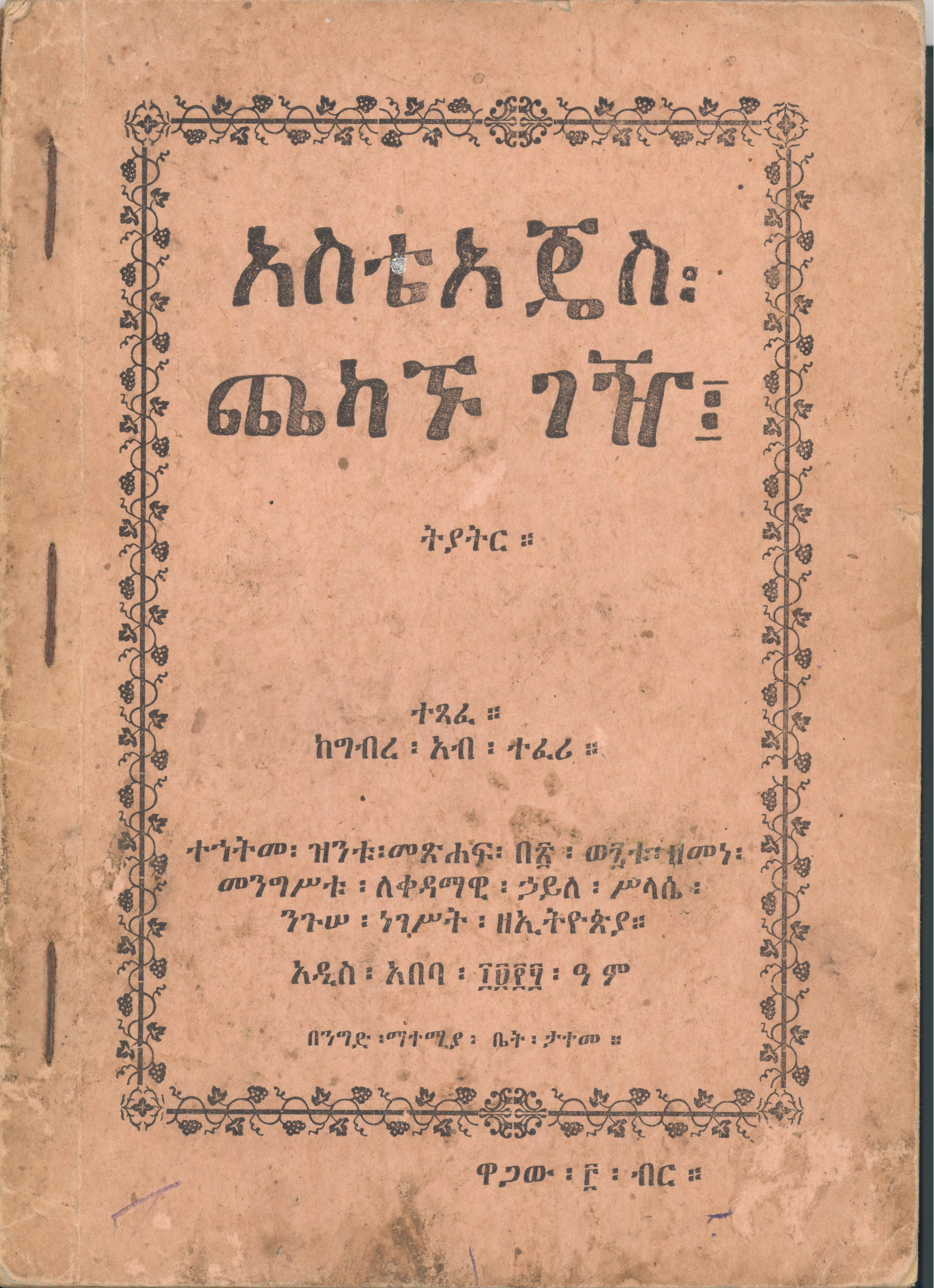
"Astyages the cruel leader" Gibreab's first book published

This is an incomplete list of plays written by Gibreab:

- "Life Potion" (Amharic: የሞት መዳኒት) 1948 (the oldest recorded theater written, dramatic verse)
- "Don't Forget Your Military Duty" (Amharic: ወታደርነትሕን አትርሳ). Presented for the army, first to be shown, dramatic verse)
- "A Soldier Is Not Afraid to Be Separated" (Amharic: ወታደር መለየት አይፈራም). Presented for the army, dramatic verse.
- "Bi-taw Amara" (Amharic: ቢተው አማረ). Shown for military, military officials, and their families dramatic verse.
- አስቴአጄስ ጨካኙ ገዢ "Astyages The Cruel Leader," 1950 EC (dramatic verse, published as a book)
- የሁለት አለም ስደተኞች "Refugee of Two World's," 1950–1953 EC (presented for higher officials, dramatic verse)
- ስማንያ "Eighty", 1976 EC (passed government censorship but not shown for public, dramatic verse)
- ፍቅር ምርጥ ሐኪም ነው "Love Is the Doctor," translated from the French play by Molière, L'Amour médecin (passed government censorship but not shown, dramatic verse)
- ተበላሽቶ ያልቀረ ባል "The Prodigal Husband," 1976 EC (Passed government censorship but not shown, dramatic verse)

In 1953 EC, the showing of "Refugee of Two Worlds" garnered Gibreab appreciation and recognition among elites, higher officials, friends, and relatives. During the play, the higher official who was sitting in front Brigadier-General Mengistu Neway ብርጋዴል ጀነራል መንግስቱ ነዋይ was touched and crying throughout the show. When it was over and Gibreab came out to the stage to greet his audience, Brigadier-General Mengistu Neway ብርጋዴል ጀነራል መንግስቱ ነዋይ came out to the stage, took off his wristwatch and gave it to Gibreab Teferi. After that Brigadier-General Mengistu Neway ብርጋዴል ጀነራል መንግስቱ ነዋይ went on to commit a coup d'état on the king Haile Selassie. The failed coup d'état cost him his life and Gibreab Teferi and the Kebur Zabagna team received a six-month prison time, including the famous Tilahun Gessesse and a forced resignation from the royal Army. Most who worked with Gibreab Teferi know and appreciate his guts and his willingness to discuss the social inequality of his time through his music, short plays, or dramatic works like this one. To this day, most argue that Gibreab's play caused the coup d'état to happen; but, according to the investigation by the king Mengistu Neway, ብርጋዴል ጀነራል መንግስቱ ነዋይ and his comrades were planning this for a while and Gibreab wasn't considered a part of that, but the timing and the play itself became the straw that broke the camel's back. To this day, Gibreab's colleagues respect him, because, as an artist, instead of trying to please his bosses or the king, he chose to be a voice for the poor and the voiceless.

==== Music ====
ወይ አዲስ አበባ ወይ አራዳ ሆይ
ሐገርም እንደ ስው ይናፍቃል ወይ

Most Ethiopians Remember Gibreab Teferi by this lyrics

Throughout his career with the Imperial Army, Gibreab continued working with music, and wrote five military marches. Three of these marches were performed in a competition in 1953 EC at the Sergaga Tore School (ስርገኛ ጦር ትምሕርት ቤት). In one competition, Gibreab's marches received first place and two of his marches received second place in different categories.

He was an accomplished musician, playing the clarinet and the traditional krar, a stringed instrument similar to a lyre, as well as possessing a strong tenor voice. He taught himself to play the krar, since it is a traditional instrument that one can learn by watching a master player and then practicing. Gibreab learned modern music in the Kebur Zabagna from the Armenian instructor Kevork Nalbandian, and become very good at playing clarinet. He also learned to read and write musical notes. Finally, he became an instructor and taught other Ethiopian musicians in the police orchestra and many others.

When Gibreab was put in prison because he was suspected of involvement in the Coup d'état, he wrote lyrics depicting the king as his lover to show how much he still loved his country. The music is called "Altelashem Kato" (አልጠላሽም ከቶ), with vocals by Tafera Kasa.

አልጠላሽም ከቶ

ጊዜ ቢያሳየኝም ጥፋትሽን አጉልቶ
እኔ እንዳንቺ አልሆንም አልጠላሽም ከቶ (2)

ፍቅራችን ይቀመጥ ድሮ እንደነበረ
ጠላሁሽ ሳልልሽ ገሸሽ አትበይ አረ
መሮሽም እንደሆን የፍቅራችን ኮሽም
እንዳሻሽ አድርጊኝ ፈጽሞ አልጠላሽም (2)

ያን ሁሉ ጥፈትሽን እለዋለሁ ይቅር
አልታደልኩምና ምንጊዜም ለፍቅር
በፍቅርሽ መንምኖ ያ ሁሉ ዘመኔ
አሁን ብትጠይኝ አልጠላሽም እኔ (2)

ጥፋት ሳላጠፋ እንዲያው ከምትሸሺ
ያለፈውን ፍቅር እባክሽ አስታውሺ
ስታደርጊ እያየሁ ፍቅራችንን ውድም
ባንቺ ላይ ነው እንጂ በጊዜው አልፈርድም (2)

ሺህ ጊዜ በድይኝ ምንም ነገር ልሁን
ኑሮ ካልለወጠኝ አልጠላሽም አሁን

— written by Gibreab Teferi while imprisoned in 1953E.C

===== Ras Band =====
In 1954 EC when a new orchestra was formed in the famous Ras Hotel, Gibreab, recently retired from the Kebur Zabagna (Imperial Guard), became one of the original members of the band, the primary Amharic lyricist (writing lyrics to more than 220 songs), and the MC of the first Ras Band. Entirely made up of Ethiopian musicians, this first Ras Band is remembered to this day as the quintessential, old-style club band.

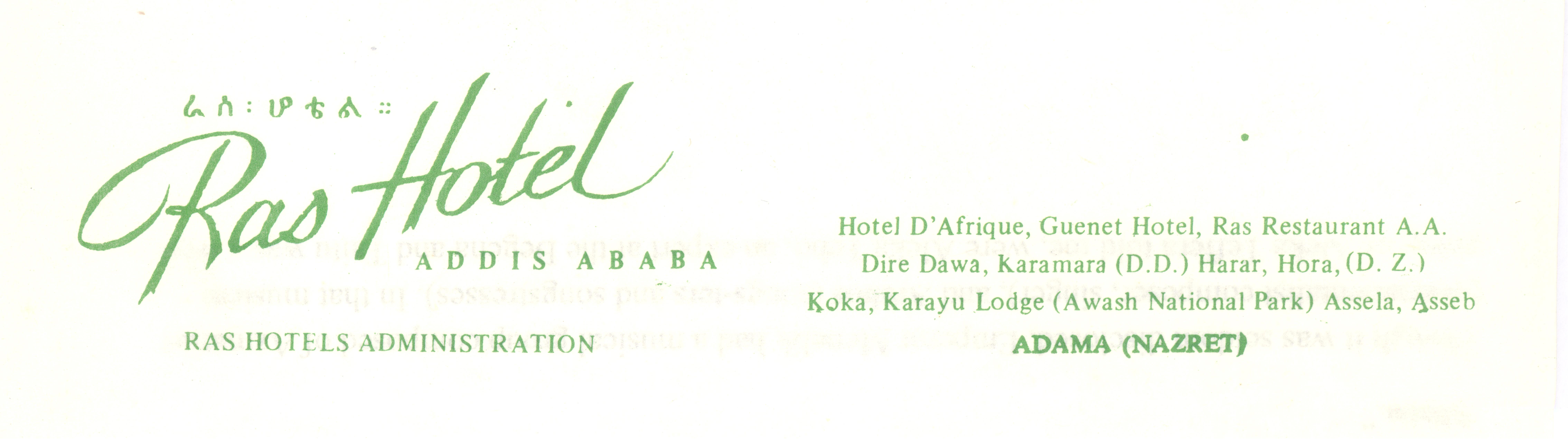
Ras Hotel Note Book Gibreab used to write lyrics

It was with the Ras Band that Bahta Gebrehiwot recorded most of his works. With the exception of maybe one or two songs, all of the Amharic songs were written by Gibreab Teferi,OSman, Sayem (20 January 2008). "The Arranger". Horizon Ethiopia. including :

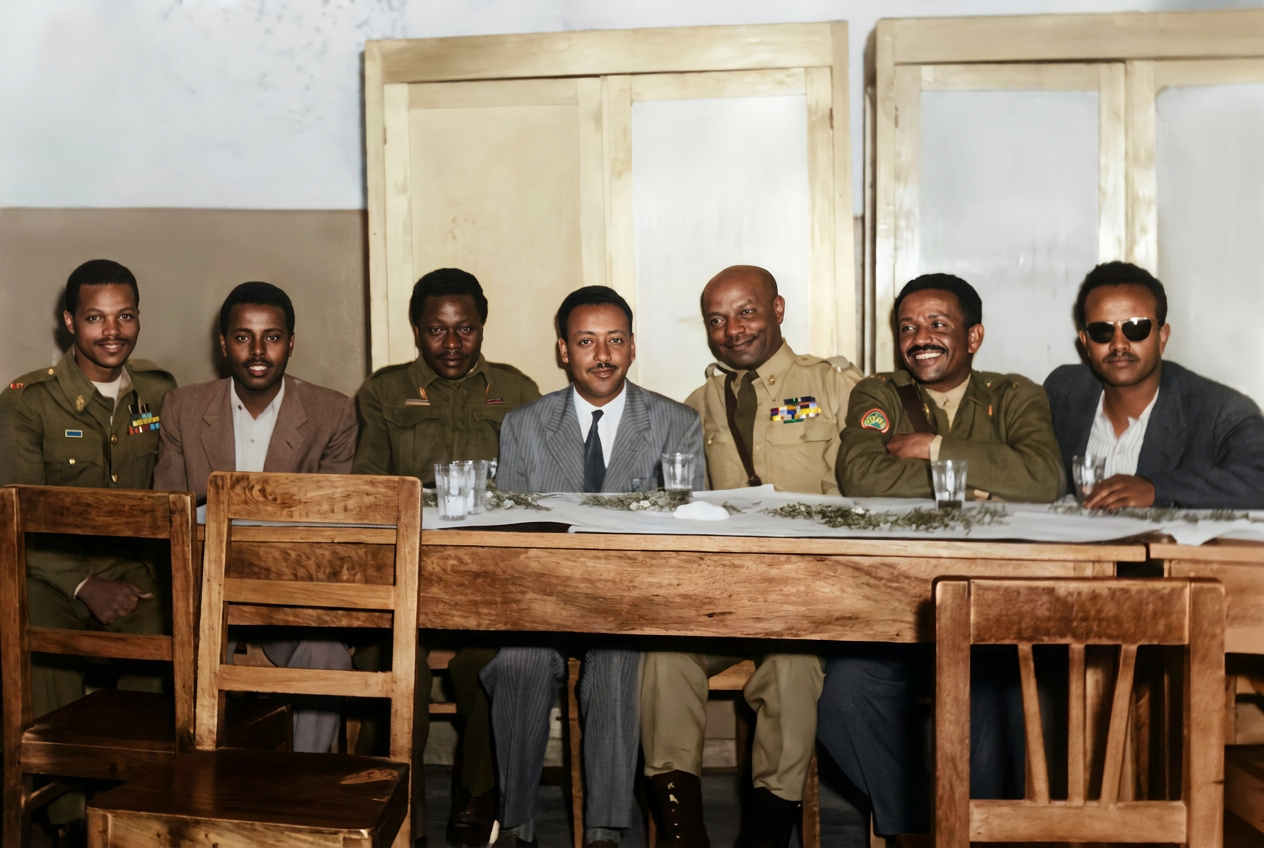
Ras Band Crew – from the right with sun glass Baheru Tadla and next to him Gibreab Teferi

- Anchim Endelela, (አንቺም እንደሌላ)
- Degmo Endemin Alesh, (ደግሞ እንደምን አለሽ)
- Yetilacha Werie, (የጥላችን ወሬ)
- Kalatashew Akal, (ካላጣሽው አካል)
- Ya Ya (ያ ያ)
- Hello (ሃ ሎ)
- Menaw Tadayalesh (ምነው ታደያለሽ)
- Gizié (ጊዜ)
- Wede Harar Guzo, (ወደ ሐረር ጉዞ)
- Enaye Nagne Waye Mognu, (እኔ ነኝ ወይ ሞኙ)
- Ya Kolega Azmara, (የቆለኛ አዝመራ)
- Gizawen Alawekem, (ጊዜውን አላውቅም)
- Tarasahugne Ende, (ተረሳሁኝ እንዴ) and many more

== Other professional roles ==
When the original Ras Band was moved to Ghion Hotel in 1967, Gibreab stayed at the Ras Hotel, transferring into management where he served as legal and director of personnel. He continued to work in the hotel industry for many years, in both management and legal departments, at all Ras Hotel branches, such as:

- Genet Hotel
- Assab Hotel
- Hotel D'Afrique

Gibreab became well regarded for his loyalty and work ethic and retained this reputation after his retirement. Throughout his career in the hospitality industry, he continued to write plays, poems, and songs.

"አራዳ ለ አራዳ ሲነፋ መለከት
ትንቡክ አርጎ ስሞ ዐይን ዐይንዋን መመልከት
ክራር አመታለሁ በየሁሉ ደጅ
እንደ አራዳ ቅኝት አላገኝም አንጂ"

— Lines from Gibreab's Oh Addis Ababa, Oh Arada Hoye

== Later years and death ==
After his retirement from the hotel industry, Gibreab worked on more plays, translating well-known plays, such as Molier's L'Amour médecin (1665) from French into Amharic.

On 14 January 1988, Gibreab Teferi died of an internal illness at Maekalawi ez Hospital.

His funeral was in Holy Trinity Cathedral, Addis Ababa.
