= National Palace, Addis Ababa =

Official residence of the President of Ethiopia

National Palace
- የብሔራዊ ቤተ መንግሥት
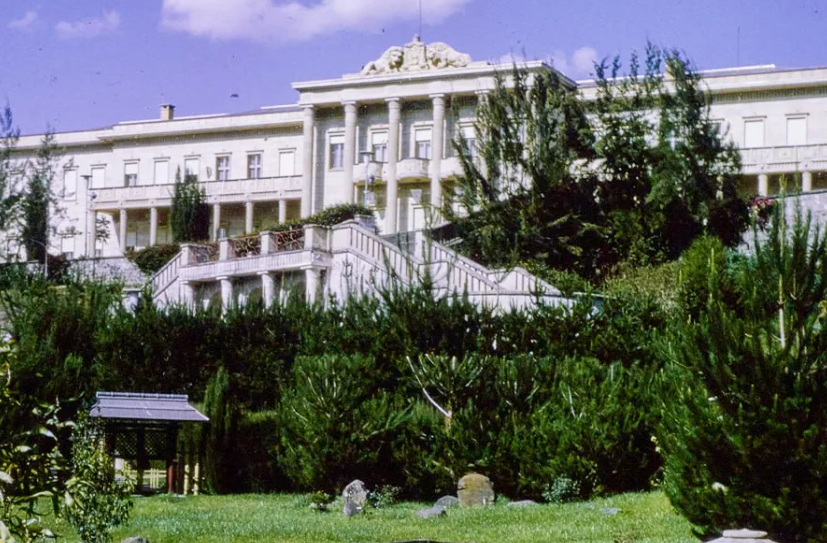
- Interactive map of the National Palace area

General information
- Type: Palace
- Architectural style: Contemporary
- Location: Yohanis St, Addis Ababa, Ethiopia
- Coordinates: 9°00′59″N 38°45′38″E
- Current tenants: Taye Atske Selassie
- Completed: 1955
- Renovation cost: 60 million birr

Technical details
- Grounds: 11,450 square metres (123,200 sq ft)

The Eyubelyu (National) Palace (Amharic: የብሔራዊ ቤተ መንግሥት), formerly Eyubelyu (Jubilee) Palace, is a palace in Addis Ababa, Ethiopia. It is an official residence of the President of Ethiopia since the Derg government.

Prior to the date, it was the house of Emperor Haile Selassie until the 1974 coup d'état.

== History ==
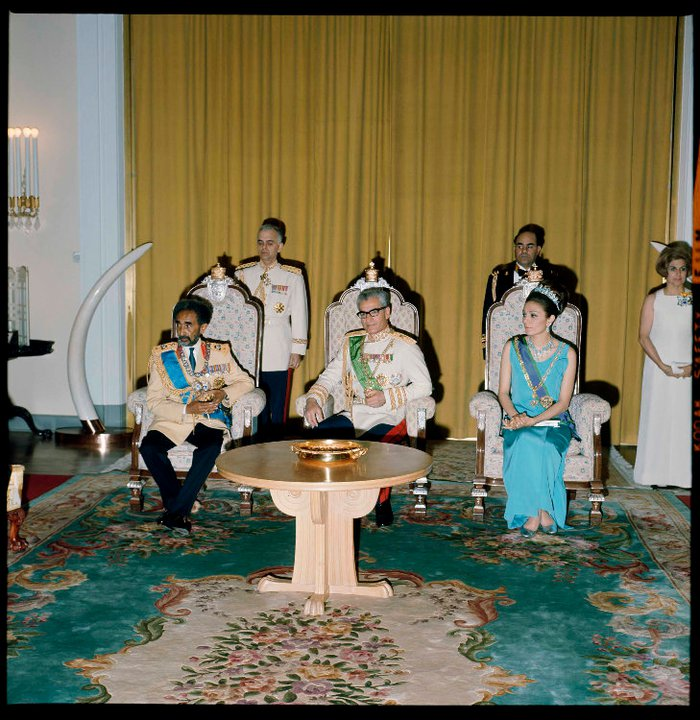
Emperor Haile Selassie receiving the Shah and Shahbanu of Iran at the Jubilee Palace, 1968

The palace was built in 1955 and named Jubilee to mark the Silver Jubilee of Emperor Haile Selassie. After a coup attempt in the Guenete Leul Palace in 1960, the Emperor made the Jubilee Palace his main residence. However, the seat of government remained at the Imperial Palace. In 1957, it was called the Ministry of Imperial Court, also known as "Ye Gebi Ministry". The palace was expanded and doubled in size between 1966 and 1967.

The Jubilee Palace was the site of the dethronement of Emperor Haile Selassie in September 1974. Ten low ranking military officers appeared before the Emperor in the palace library and read him the statement of the Derg, which officially removed him from the throne. The Derg renamed the palace the National Palace, which it still bears today. The Derg used this palace for state ceremonies involving visiting heads of state, state banquets and receptions. The Derg added a swimming pool to the grounds. With the fall of the Derg, and the proclamation of the Federal Republic, the National Palace became the official residence of the president of the Federal Democratic Republic of Ethiopia. The president has a ceremonial role and uses the palace for official functions. In 2005, a proclamation was issued for streamline work in the Administration Office where 13 palaces were administered by the office, which was charged for organizing state reception. The office has 14 directorates and 1,060 employees.

In 2019, The Ethiopian government announced in its intention to build a new official presidential residence, after which the National Palace inaugurated a new museum. It continues to house the president until that time.

=== Current state ===
The Administration restored 10 old buildings constructed by Emperor Menelik II and his daughter Empress Zewditu inside Menelik Palace. The renovation was undertaken by Vareno consultancy. (So this para refers to the old Palace or Gibbe, not the National Palace)
