= Opposition to Haile Selassie =

Opposition to the Ethiopian monarchy from 1960 to 1974

Opposition to Haile Selassie relied largely on the internal administration of the Ethiopian Empire. While the Emperor Haile Selassie made attempts to modernize the country and increase its global power after Italian occupation from 1936–1941, the later administration was met with negative public attitude, especially among educated people in universities and the peasants.

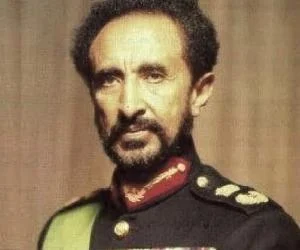
Haile Selassie portrait

Armed resistance to Selassie was initially centered on the two poles of the Ethiopian Empire, Eritrea province in the north and the Ogaden region to the south. There were several coup attempts to overthrow Selassie's government, notably in 1960, and several high-profile events that degraded Selassie's reputation, including over taxation in Gojjam since 1930, famines in Tigray and Wollo provinces since 1958, and autocratic land seizure.

The first student movements were held at Addis Ababa University in 1965, seeking land redistribution and abolition of feudalism. Other aspects include the Eritrean War of Independence in 1962, seeking Eritrean autonomy from the Ethiopian imperial government.

In 1974, Selassie was finally overthrown during the Ethiopian Revolution.

== Foreign contributions ==
After returning to the throne following Italy's occupation of Ethiopia from 1936 to 1941, Selassie externally contributed for African decolonization in the Cold War that made him internationally popular. He played a significant role in placing Ethiopia into an advantageous position in Suez Canal, supported by the United States, the Soviet bloc and non-aligned Yugoslavia against each other. In addition, Addis Ababa was chosen as the seat for the United Nations Economic Commission for Africa (UNECA) headquarters in 1958, and of the Organization of African Unity (OAU) in 1963, culminating in this historical milestone in the mid-1960s.

== 1960s – early 1970s students upheavals ==
On 13 December 1960, a military coup d'état took place in Addis Ababa at Guenete Leul Palace while Selassie was returning from state visit to Brazil, the coup was the deadliest in the capital city until the 1974 Revolution. This coup considered as the starting point of the student movements.

However, there are various factors for the development of the student movement. For example, in 1958, the Accra Conference of Independent African States was held as the Ethiopian Imperial government anxiously managed to secure the newly independent African countries, announcing 200 scholarships to students from other parts of Africa to study in institutions of higher learning in the country.

By 1962–63, the program has benefited 120 students from Egypt, Ghana, Kenya, Liberia, Nigeria, Rhodesia, Somalia, and Tanganyika (now Tanzania). Most countries were successfully decolonized by dramatic political struggle, when Ethiopian students learned about this achievement of African countries, they determined to be emancipated from the feudal status of their country. Ethiopian students also contributed to the fall of the Selassie regime and precursor to the 1974 revolution by organizing nationwide protests. Student movements generally began in December 1960, when students from Addis Ababa University College gathered to support the 1960 coup d'état.

The second movement stemmed from the Ethiopian University Service (EUS) Program which was introduced in 1964. This program was mandatory for Ethiopian students to work one year in Provinces, numbered 132 in that year, increasing to 262 in 1966–67 and 590 in 1971–72, mainly serving as teachers. For example, in 1966–67, 189, or 72.1% of the participants, taught in schools. These teachers, who also participated in "numerous extracurricular activities" brought to the outlying schools' first-hand information of the Ethiopian Student Movement, which was virtually restricted to the Addis Ababa campuses during its early existence.

The small student sectors were inactive for a few years after the 1960 coup d'état. By 1965, students from Addis Ababa University marched in the streets of the city under the slogan of "Land to the Tiller". Staged in February 1965, it sought parliamentary discussion about a bill to regulate tenancy, demanding more drastic land reform and land distribution instead.

== Wollo crisis ==
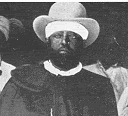
Ras Gugsa Wale before 1930

The northern provinces of Gondar, Gojjam, Wollo and Tigray are enriched with plow-based agriculture. Between 1928 and 1930, rebellions of Wollo against Shewan domination caused by Ras Gugsa Wale, a northern Amhara lord, claiming the throne against Shewan Ras Teferi (who crowned himself Haile Selassie after defeating the revolt). The Selassie government responded by suppression. This involved quartering soldiers with local people, coupled with the interruption of salt trade, high lootings and confiscation of cattle. Combined with locusts and droughts, this resulted in a famine.

Selassie ordered importation of grain from India to supply Addis Ababa without relief for north Wollo. Political measures were taken immediately such as replacing much of the administration, which formerly had grassroots, with appointees from Shewa, and joining the rebellion provinces in southern Wollo.

== Woyane revolt ==
Following defeating the Italians in 1941, there were revolts in Tigray Province, also known as the Woyane Rebellion, the most internal threat that Haile Selassie faced. With the alliance of Oromo semi-pastoralists of Raya Azebo, disgruntled peasants, and some feudal lords, headed by famous shifta, Haile Mariam Reda, they were able to control the whole province. The British aircraft were called from Aden to suppress the rebels via bombardment.

While some aristocratic members such as Ras Seyoum Mengesha willingly administered the province in a treated manner, there were reprisals against ordinary people, most notably the Raya and Azebo Oromo who were subjected to wholesale land alienation, and much of their territories transferred to Wollo. The area was hit by a deadly famine as a consequence.

== Gojjam revolt ==
Gojjam had history of independence for centuries and detachment to Shewan rule. The Ganjam revolt was a result of imposition of tax by the central government and confiscation of land. The taxation was not only for imposition but feared that it would undermine traditional land tenure and the farmers independence destroyed.

There were attempts of measure in Gojjam in the 1940s and 1950s; as peasant resistance came to light, all attempts of violence failed. In early 1960s, Gojjam paid 0.1% of land, while being one of the richest and most populous provinces. Compared to smaller provinces such as Bale, Gojjam paid less land tax. In 1951/52, there was armed resistance, including a plot to assassinate Selassie, but reappeared broadly in 1958 as part of a systematic attempt to levy an agricultural income tax.

In February 1968, in response to the arrival of political parties of government officials accompanied by armed police, the peasants of Mota and Bichena districts resorted to armed resistance. After months of stalemate and antigovernmental resistance, Selassie sent troops to Gojjam in July and August. Several hundred died from the incident. In 1969, Selassie cancelled all tax and made no serious attempt to collect the new taxes.

== Famine in Wollo and Tigray ==
In 1974, Selassie was criticized for concealing the existence of the famine in Wollo in 1972–73. Addis Ababa University Professor Mesfin Woldemariam documented that the 1958 and 1966 famines in Tigray and Wollo were treated as official indifference, affected the peasants, and was considered one of the reasons for Selassie's notorious reputation.

The 1958 famine in Tigray went unchecked without government relief. In 1965/66, information about famines in Were Ilu province arrived to Ministry of the Interior in November 1965, one month after the situation became clear to the local police, without any measures taken. It took 302 days to reach the Emperor, who then ordered to the Ministry to act. A request was made to the Wollo authority to send a list of the names of people who died from the famine. Small relief distribution was set up.

== Eritrean federation with Ethiopia ==
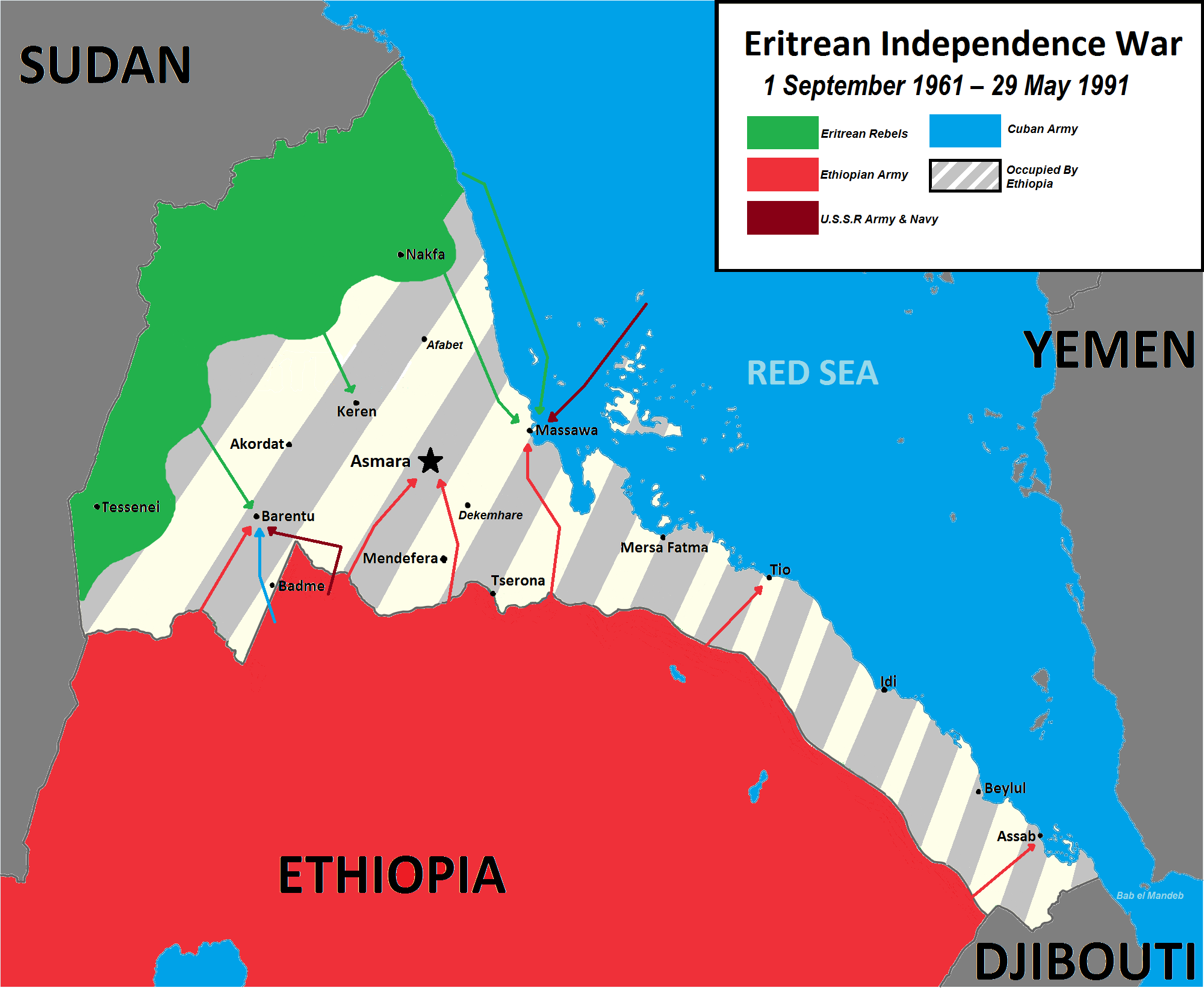
Map of Eritrea in 1970s situation

After being a colony of Italy since 1882, Eritrea was placed under British military administration in 1941 during the East African Campaign. In 1947, Italy renounced all rights to Eritrea under a peace treaty. In December 1950, the UN General Assembly passed Resolution 390 A (V), making Eritrea an autonomous unit federated with Ethiopia under the Ethiopian Crown. Eritrea formally became a constituent state of the federation of Ethiopia and Eritrea on 15 September 1952.

From its inception, the federation was undermined by the Eritrean government, which was controlled by the Unionist Party. The party had campaigned for complete union with Ethiopia and worked against the federal arrangement throughout its existence. The first Chief Executive, Tedla Bairu, governed without consulting his cabinet or the Eritrean Assembly and repeatedly violated constitutional provisions. His successor, Asfaha Woldemikael, elected in August 1955, simultaneously held the role of vice-representative of the Emperor, making any meaningful separation of Eritrean and Ethiopian authority nominal in practice. By 1958 the constitution had effectively ceased to function. On 15 November 1962, the Eritrean Assembly voted unanimously to dissolve the federation and incorporate Eritrea into the Ethiopian Empire as a province.

The Eritrean Liberation Front (ELF) was established in Cairo in July 1960 by Eritrean exiles, drawn largely from the political tradition of the Moslem League. Hamid Idris Awate began armed resistance on 1 September 1961, marking the start of the Eritrean War of Independence. By the mid-1960s, the Ethiopian government had deployed its Second Division against the ELF, marking a significant escalation of the conflict.

== Ogaden and Bale revolts ==
On 16 June 1963, the Ethiopian government began its first attempts to collect taxes in the Ogaden region, greatly incensing the already discontent Somali population, as they had lived without taxation for centuries. At Hodayo, a watering place north of Werder, 300 men of Nasrallah picked Mukhtal Dahir to lead an insurgency against the Ethiopians under the banner of the al-Jaysh ( الجيش in Arabic) or Jabhada (the front). The group was most commonly referred to as Nasrallah, though often referred to by foreigners as the Ogaden Liberation Front. The organization would form the foundation of the future Western Somali Liberation Front. At its peak, the combined forces of the insurgents controlled nearly 70 percent of the Ogaden region. Primarily, their operations were conducted in the lowland Hararghe and Bale provinces of Ethiopia. In a bid to control the largely nomadic population of the region during 1963, an Ethiopian Imperial Army division based out of Harar torched Somali villages and carried out mass killings of livestock. Watering holes were machine gunned by aircraft in order to control the Somalis by denying them access to water. Thousands of residents were driven from the Ogaden into Somalia as refugees.

The use of northern settlers to secure southern regions of the empire was a tactic that was used extensively in the 10th to 16th centuries in the Abyssinian Empire and during the reign of Menelik. In the Bale region this was frequent, and Oromo/Somali aimed to wipe out the domination of the Amhara settlers known as the Neftenya. This resettlement policy consequently resulted in a shortage of arable land in Bale due to land expropriation. The best land in the region eventually became owned by Amharas and higher officials in the province were disproportionately Christian, greatly incensing the Muslim Oromo/Somali population. Serious revolt broke out in Bale region during a fairly minor incident in the Wabe district of Bale in 1964, after the governor of the region had unsuccessfully attempted to collect taxes with a large police force. This act of defiance to the central government inspired rebellions to pop up elsewhere in the district culminating in the seizure of the town of Belitu by Oromo/Somali forces. Resistance then spread over to neighboring Delo district and by the end of 1965 central Bale was in total revolt and under rebel control. Fighting gradually increased in intensity until 1966, at which point the Ethiopian government declared a state of emergency and deployed the army.

Fierce ground assaults and airstrikes by government forces in high and lowland Bale during the opening months of 1967 resulted in significant casualties amongst the civilian population. Many of the peasants and pastoralists who had homes and crops devastated in the air attacks were terror stricken as they had never seen ordnance before. Thousands of Oromos fled to Somalia in the face of intensive aerial bombardments, where they remained for decades.

== Lead up to collapse of the Ethiopian Imperial government ==
As the regime of Emperor Haile Selassie declined, the army became increasingly politicized as Selassie increasingly relied on more oppressive measures of governance. As recruitment from educated Ethiopians grew during the 60s and early 70s, the political consciousness of the armed forces grew as well. This awareness grew as the army was increasingly utilized to put down student protests, peasant uprisings and regional revolts in Ogaden, Bale and Eritrea. The multiplication of regional revolts and economic downturn in the country during the early 70s made many army units rebellious as their living conditions deteriorated. The military mutiny that precipitated the 1974 revolution started as demands for better working conditions and wages for troops in remote regions, particularly the Ogaden, Negele and the desert of western Eritrea.

By 1973, it was clear to many observers that the army was the true power behind the throne, and it was widely expected that the military would take over in the event of the emperor's death. Since the failed Ethiopian coup attempt in 1960, no further coup was attempted largely due to the deep divisions within the armed forces, particularly the officer corps.

In April 1974 the Ethiopian Muslim Protests occurred which was considered a massive rally at the time as over 100,000 citizens participated.
