= Mulugeta Buli =

Mulugeta Buli (1917–1960), was an Ethiopian military general and politician.

== Biography ==
After completing mission school Buli attended the Tafari Makonnen School and the Holeta Military Academy, and was the only Oromo officer cadet in the latter institution. He was an opponent of Italian fascism, and fled to Kenya and Djibouti during the Italian occupation of Ethiopia. He fought in the Battle of Maychew as an officer in Haile Selassie's elite Guard contingent which was better trained and equipped than most other Ethiopian units. As commander of the Imperial Body Guard from 1941 until 1955, he established the Kagnew Battalions and the Ethiopian Public Security Department. He served as chief of staff of the armed forces, chief of staff of the emperor, and as a member of the Ethiopian government, in which capacity he created a private security cabinet for Emperor Selassie.

Organizers of the 1960 Ethiopian coup attempt wanted Buli to become Chief of Staff because of his popularity among members of the armed forces. After refusing he was taken hostage (along with 20 other government officials) by the rebels. When it became apparent that the take-over was doomed to fail General Buli was killed with 14 others on 17 December 1960 by forces under Brigadier-General Mengistu Neway, a leader of the coup - and a fellow veteran of the battle of Maychew.

Ivo Strecker of Johannes Gutenberg-Universität Mainz called Buli "one of the most charismatic figures among the young Ethiopian elite" of his era. Author Bahru Zewde suggests that Buli was rumoured to be engineering a coup of his own to depose Selassie in the early 1950s, but had never substantiated these rumours. There is now a technical college in Addis Ababa named in honour of Buli.
