= Kebur Zabagna =

Imperial bodyguards of Ethiopia

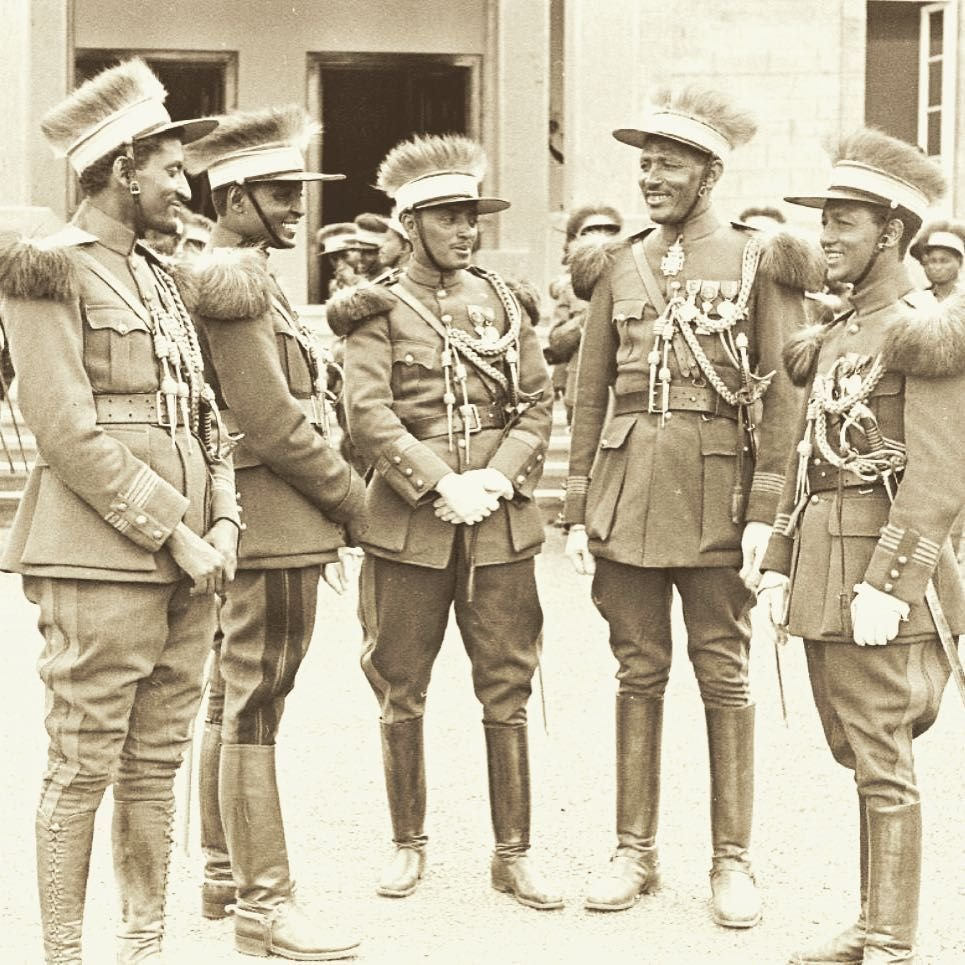
- Members of the Kebur Zabagna
- Active: 1917–1936; 1941–1974
- Country: Ethiopian Empire
- Branch: Army
- Type: Imperial guard Infantry
- Size: 9 Battalions
- Garrison/HQ: Addis Ababa
- Patron: Emperor of Ethiopia
- Engagements: Second Italo-Ethiopian War; Battle of Maychew; Korean War; Battle of Pork Chop Hill

Commanders
- Ceremonial chief: Emperor of Ethiopia

The Kebur Zebenya (Amharic: ክቡር ዘበኛ, romanized: kəbur zãbãňňya, lit. 'honorable guard') was the Ethiopian imperial guard. Also known as the First Division, this unit served the dual purposes of providing security for the Emperor of Ethiopia, and being an elite infantry division. It was not, however, part of the organizational structure of the Ethiopian regular army as it was part of the Zebagna, the Addis Ababa Guard. The Kebur Zabagna was based in Addis Ababa.

== History ==
=== Establishment ===
Richard Pankhurst dates the formation of the Imperial Bodyguard (previously known as the Mehal Sefari) to 1917, when the Regent Ras Tafari (later the Emperor Haile Selassie) assembled a unit under his direct control from men who had trained in the British army in Kenya as well as a few who had served under the Italians in Tripoli. In 1930 as Negus he invited a Belgian military mission to train and modernize the Ethiopian military, which included the Kebur Zabagna. The unit was organized in three battalions of trained regular infantry armed with rifles, machine guns and mortars; one battalion consisted of men from the earlier mahal safari. The Kebur Zabagna also had one heavy machine gun company. It was commanded by Ethiopian graduates of Saint Cyr, the French military academy, at the time of the Italian invasion of Ethiopia.

=== Italian occupation ===
As a unit, the Imperial Bodyguard only participated in the Battle of Maychew (31 March 1936), where they inflicted heavy losses on the 2nd Eritrean Division until the Ethiopian troops were forced to withdraw; the Imperial Guard thereafter served in the rearguard. Afterward, many of its members joined the various groups of the Ethiopian resistance. One of these was Kosrof Gorgorios Boghossian, a colonel in the Kebur Zabagna and of Armenian descent, who was the father of noted artist Skunder Boghossian

=== Post-occupation ===
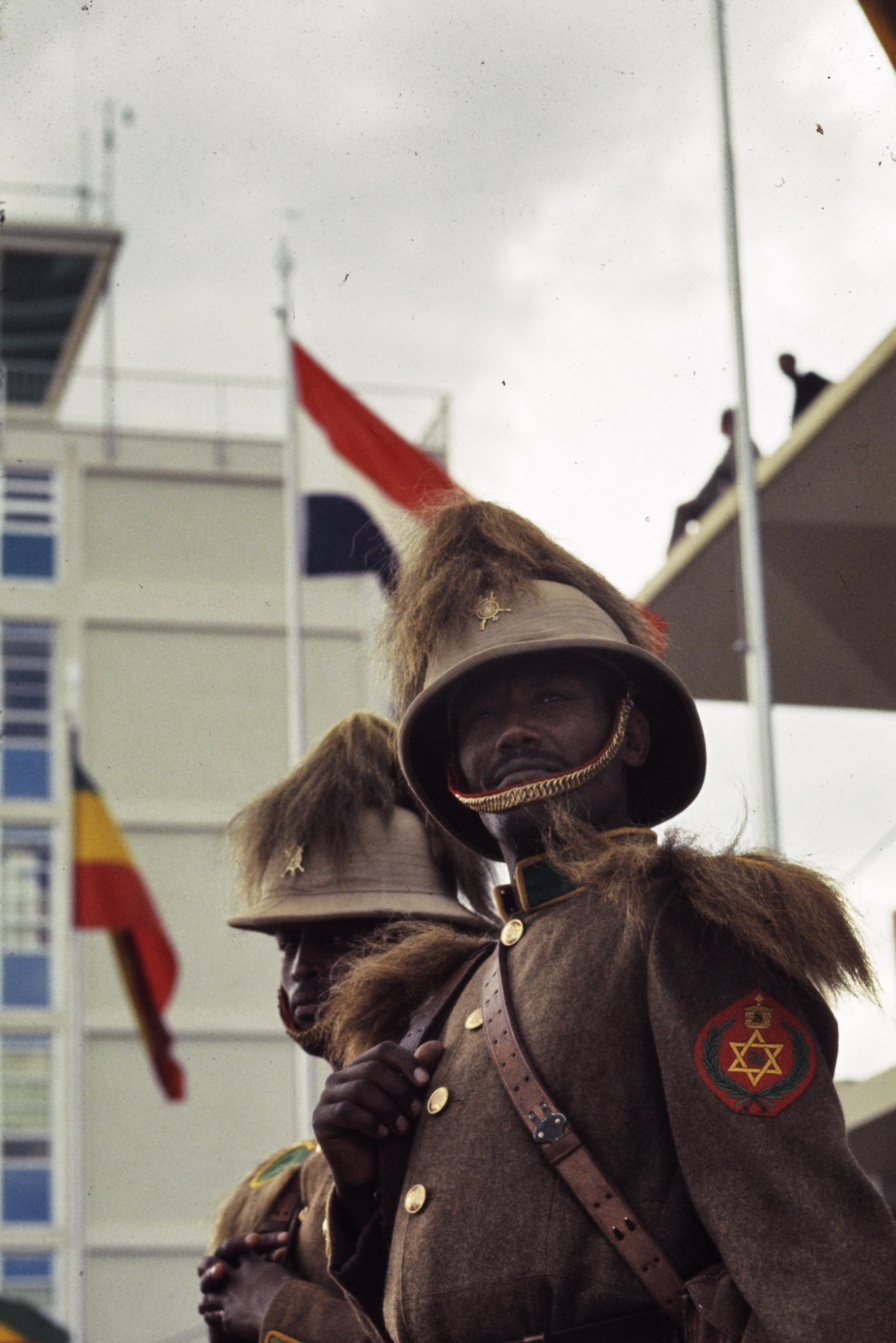
Members of the Imperial Guard during the state visit by Queen Juliana of the Netherlands to Ethiopia, 1969

Following the return of Emperor Haile Selassie to Ethiopia, the Kebur Zabagna was reconstituted, and a Swedish military mission aided in its training. Men for the Kagnew Battalion, which fought in the Korean War, were drawn from the Imperial Bodyguard. During the Korean War they were armed with American weapons which included the M1 Garand .30-06, M1 carbine .30 and some had M1911 .45 ACP pistols.

"It remained the elite force of the empire," notes historian Bahru Zewde, "until discredited in the wake of the attempted coup of 1960." That unsuccessful coup had been planned by its commander Brigadier-General Mengistu Neway, and his brother Germame Neway. In 1961 it numbered nine battalions; in 1969 some 7,000 men.

During the state visits of Elizabeth II and Mohammad Reza Pahlavi to Ethiopia, Emperor Hail Selassie's Silver Jubilee Golden State Carriage was drawn by team of six Lippizaner horses and accompanied by 100 Imperial Guard on horseback in red and green uniforms.

The Kebur Zabagna was disbanded after the Derg consolidated their hold on Ethiopia.

== Imperial Bodyguard Band ==
The first permanent military band in the country to be established the Imperial Bodyguard Band in 1929 under the direction of Swiss conductor Andre Nicod. It was notable for its implementation of western style military music conventions in a first for any African nation.

== Notable members of the Kebur Zabagna ==
=== Commanders ===
- General Mulugeta Buli (1941–1955)
- Brigadier-General Mengistu Neway (April 1956 – 13 December 1960)
- Major-General Tafessa Lemma (1974)

=== Soldiers ===
- Abebe Bikila, professional athlete and member of the 5th Infantry Regiment.
- Fisseha Desta, first Vice President of Ethiopia from 1987 to 1991.

=== Bandsmen ===
- Tilahun Gessesse
- Mahmoud Ahmed.
