= Kagnew Battalion =

Military unit of the Ethiopian Imperial Army, fought in Korean War

1st, 2nd and 3rd Kagnew Battalions
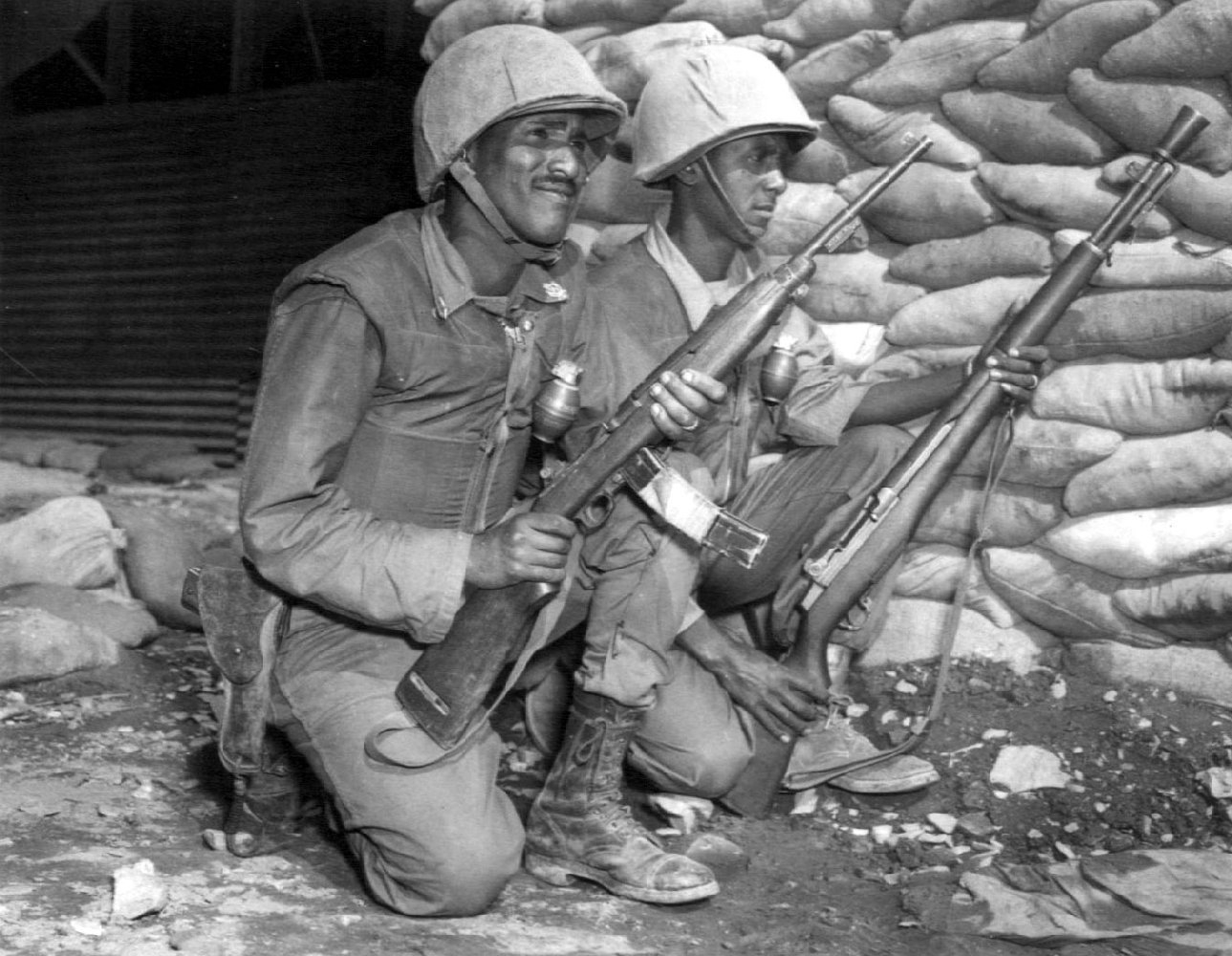
- Ethiopian soldiers with the Kagnew Battalion, 7th Inf. Div. in Korea, 1953
- Active: 1951–1965
- Country: Ethiopia
- Allegiance: United Nations
- Branch: Army
- Type: Infantry; Battalion
- Size: 6,037 soldiers in total
- Part of: US 7th Infantry Division
- Patron: Emperor Haile Selassie I
- Engagements: Korean War; Battle of Pork Chop Hill
- Decorations: US Presidential Unit Citation

Commanders
- Notable commanders: Col. Kebbede Guebre Capt Mamo Habtewold

The Kagnew Battalions (Amharic: ቃኘው) were a number of military units from the Imperial Ethiopian Army which fought as part of United Nations Command in the Korean War (1950–53). The battalions rotated yearly, with the First Kagnew Battalion arriving at the front in 1951. The Third Kagnew Battalion which arrived in 1953, stayed through the signing of the armistice into 1954. Over the next two years more Ethiopians guarded the stalemate in Korea as part of the Fourth Kagnew Battalion and the Fifth Kagnew Company. Even though some publications indicate Ethiopians remained in Korea until 1965, in fact they remained a part of the United Nations Command until 1975. Members of Kagnew Battalion were, with few exceptions, drawn from the Ethiopian Imperial Bodyguard Division.

Altogether, 3,158 Ethiopians served in Kagnew Battalions during the war.

== Etymology ==
"Kagnew" (Amharic: Judge) was the name of Ras Makonnen's warhorse. Ras Makonnen (1852–1906) was one of Emperor Menelik II's generals during the First Italo-Ethiopian War and Haile Selassie's father.

== Background ==
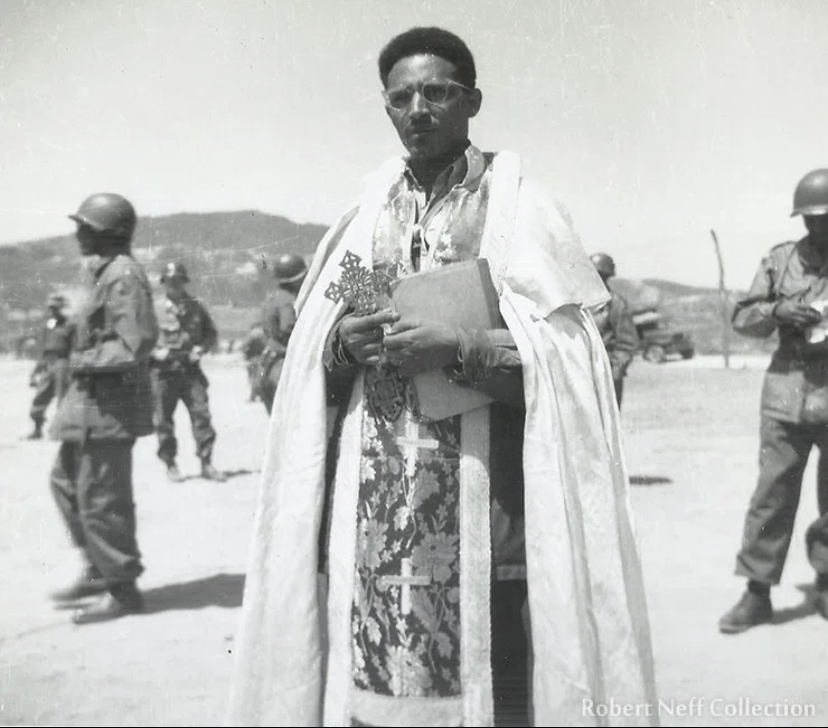
Chaplain of the Kagnew Battalion in Korea

At the outbreak of war in the Korean peninsula in 1950, the United Nations sent a plea to its member nations for military assistance. Emperor Haile Selassie of Ethiopia, an ardent supporter of collective security, pledged to dispatch an infantry battalion.

The Armed Forces of the Ethiopian Empire at that time consisted of the Imperial Bodyguard Division, three army divisions, a budding air force and a provincial/territorial/reserve army. The Imperial Bodyguard Division (Kebur Zabagna) was the most elite military force in the empire with responsibility for safeguarding the royal household and maintaining internal security. Therefore, the battalions destined to Korea were drawn mostly from the officers and men of the Imperial Bodyguard Division. They were then given intensive training in the mountains of Ethiopia for acclimatization.

== Performance in the Korean War ==
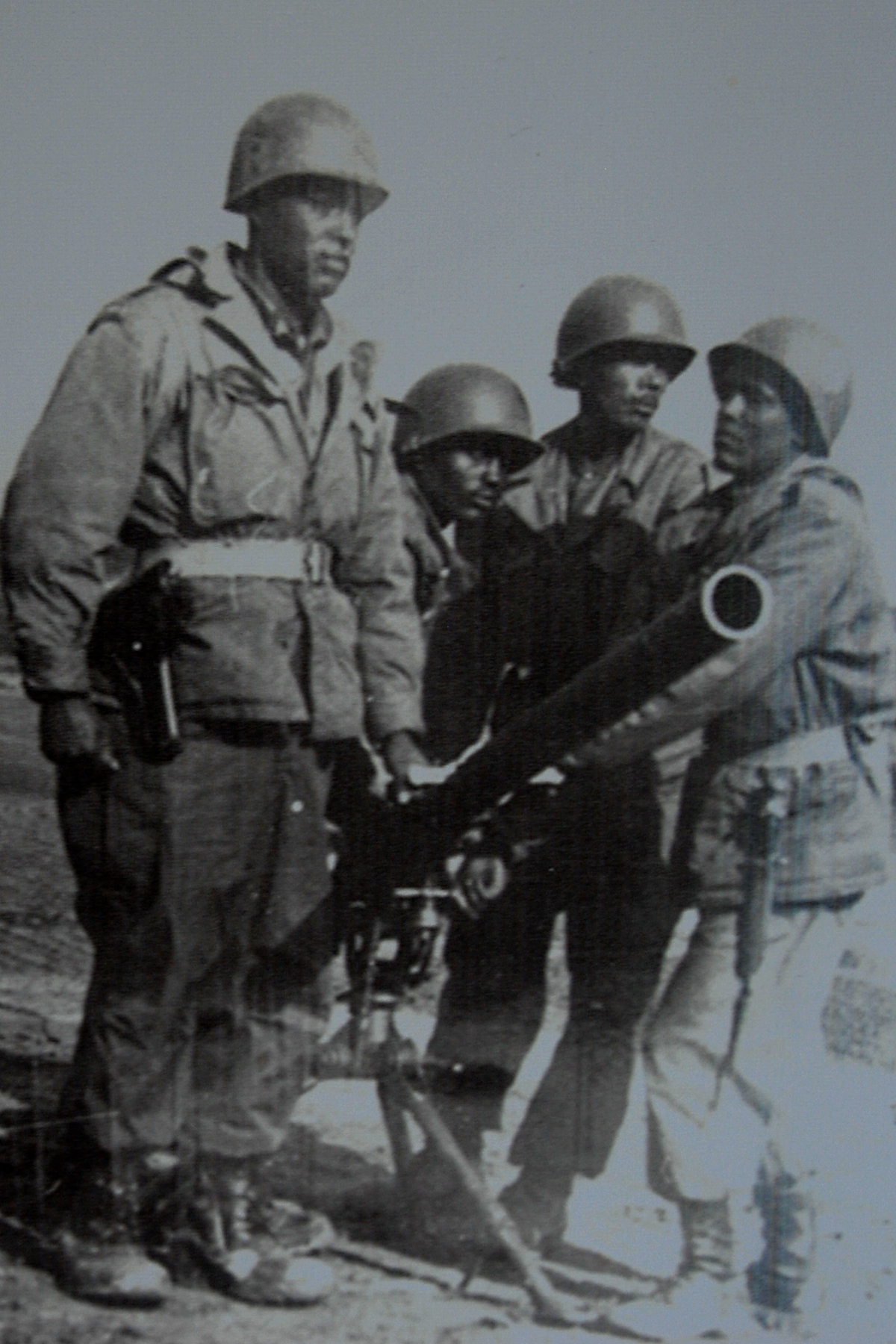
Ethiopian soldiers in Korea

The Kagnews served with great distinction, principally alongside the 7th Infantry Division, and by all accounts (including the enemy's) acquitted themselves well in battle, suffering 121 dead and 536 wounded during the course of the conflict.

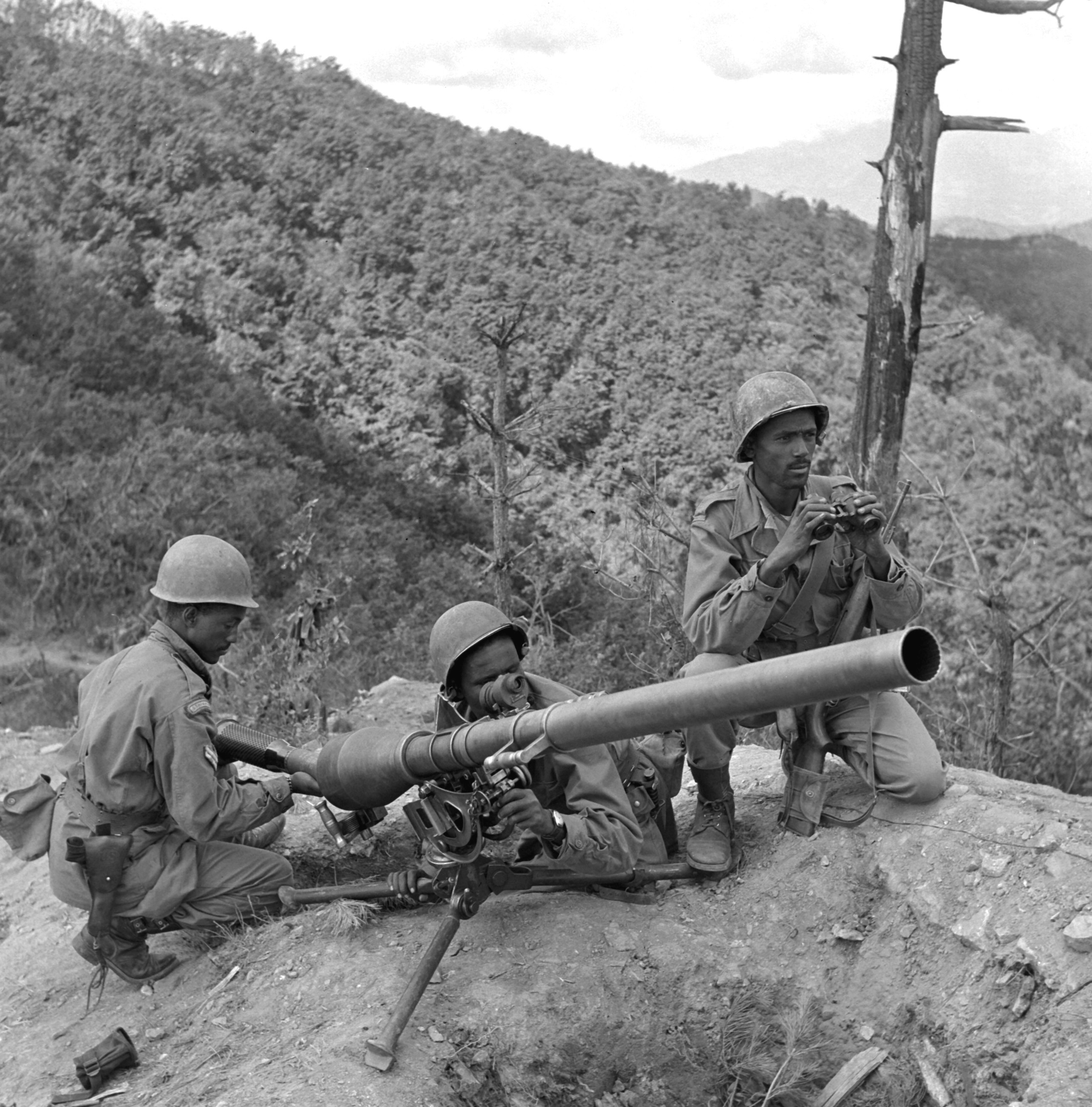
Ethiopian gunners prepare a 75mm recoilless gun

One of the feats S. L. A. Marshall thought worth noting was an Ethiopian patrol at the Battle of Pork Chop Hill in 1953 when "...under full observation from enemy country, eight Ethiopians walked 800 yards across no-man's land and up the slope of T-Bone Hill right into the enemy trenches. When next we looked, the eight had become ten. The patrol was dragging back two Chinese prisoners, having snatched them from the embrace of the Communist battalion..."

British military historian John Keegan notes that the Ethiopian units drawn from the Imperial Guard ("an over-privileged and somewhat pampered force") fought with some distinction in Korea between 1951 and 1954, although performing less competently in the Congo (1960–64).

At least nine Silver Star Medals and dozens of Bronze Star Medals were also awarded to the Ethiopians by the United States. Two members, Lieutenant Colonel Teshome Irgetu and 2nd Lt. Habtewold Mamo, were awarded the highest Ethiopian gallantry award, and became "Knights of the Order of Emperor Menelik II".

== Post war ==
When the US established a military base in the newly-federated Eritrea in 1953, they renamed the base Kagnew Station in honor of the officers and men who served in Korea.

Kagnew's exploits have been covered in detail in Pork Chop Hill by S.L.A. Marshall. Commenting on the fighting dogma of the Ethiopians Marshall states, "Like Horatius at the bridge or the screaming eagles at Bastogne, it was a classic fight, ending in clean triumph over seemingly impossible odds". Pointing out that war correspondents who were drawn to the headline values of such operations as Little Switch the 163 war correspondents overlooked the equally interesting and unrivaled Ethiopian feats.[...]

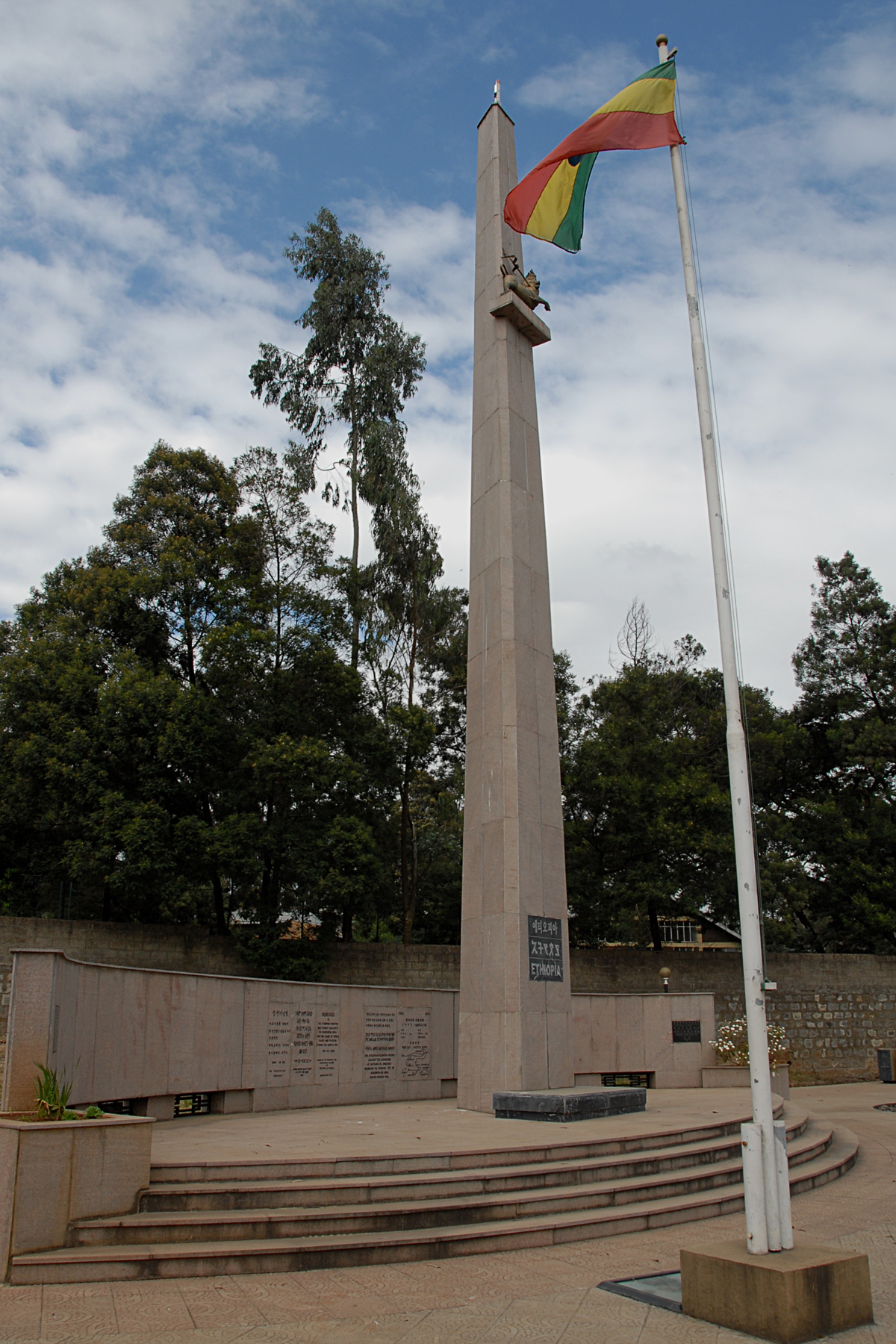
Memorial for the Kagnew Battalion

When the Communist Junta of Mengistu Haile Mariam came to power in 1974, it did everything to erase the "embarrassing" record of the Kagnew's service against the communists.

The Imperial Bodyguard Association has existed quietly since the division was dissolved by the Derg military junta and continues to celebrate the accomplishments of the officers and men not only of the Kagnew Battalion but of the Guard at large. It is currently under the leadership of Brigadier General Desta Gemeda (Ret.). The Korean War Veterans Association is under the leadership of Colonel Melesse Tessema (Ret.).

== Publications ==
In 1954, Greek journalist Kimon Skordiles chronicled the exploits of the Ethiopian troops in his book Kagnew, the Story of the Ethiopian Fighters in Korea, even while his own countrymen were operating in the same theater of war. In 2008, the son of a Kagnew veteran translated that work into Amharic paying tribute to the officers and men of the three battalions, the Emperor who had the foresight to send them and authors S.L.A. Marshall and Kimon Skordiles for their efforts in ensuring that the feat of those that had served was not forgotten.

In 2019, Helion & Company published Emperor's Own: The History of the Ethiopian Imperial Bodyguard Battalion in the Korean War as part of their Asia@War series following the success of their Africa@War series. The book was distributed worldwide.

== See also ==
- United Nations Forces in the Korean War
- Medical support in the Korean War
