= 1960 Ethiopian coup attempt =

Attempted coup d'état against Ethiopian Emperor Haile Selassie

- Part of Opposition to Haile Selassie
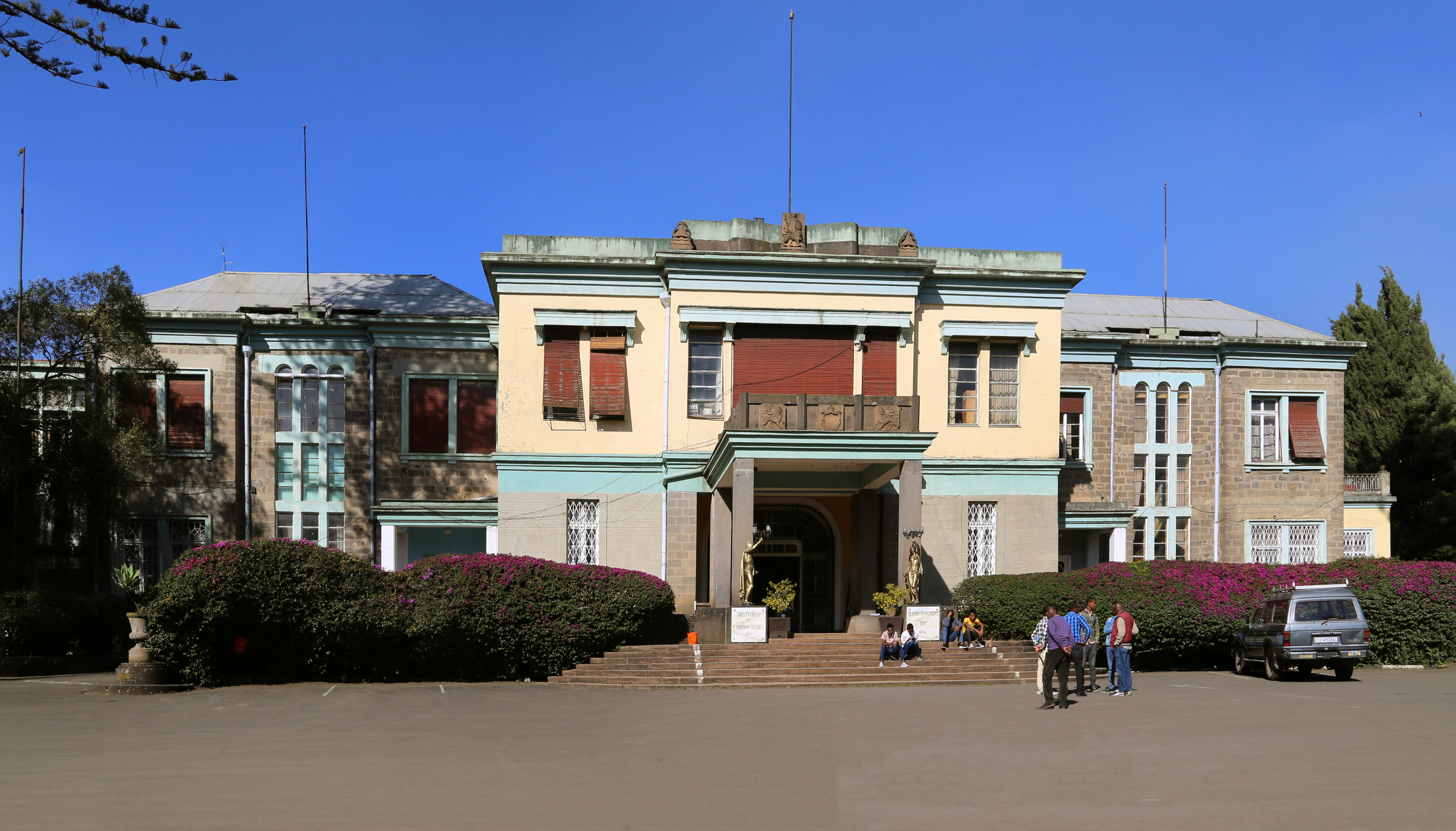
- Guenete Leul Palace in 2018, one of the scenes of the failed coup
Date	13–17 December 1960 (4 days)
Location	Addis Ababa, Ethiopia
Result	Loyalist victory

Belligerents
(Ethiopian Empire) Haile Selassie I loyalists	(Ethiopian Empire) Council of the Revolution: Germame Neway ‡‡; Warqenah Gabayahu (executed); Tsege Dibu (executed); (Ethiopian Empire) Kebur Zabagna: Mengistu Neway (executed)

Commanders and leaders
Asrate Medhin Kassa; Mared Mangesha	Germame Neway; Mengistu Neway; Warqenah Gabayahu; Tsege Dibu

Casualties and losses
- 300–2,000 killed, including civilians

A coup d'état was attempted against Emperor Haile Selassie of Ethiopia on 13 December 1960 by the Council of the Revolution, a cabal of four conspirators led by brothers Germame Neway and Brigadier General Mengistu Neway, commander of the Kebur Zabagna (Imperial Guard). They sought to overthrow the emperor during a state visit to Brazil in order to install a progressive government.

The coup leaders aimed to install a new government to be nominally under the rule of Haile Selassie's eldest son, Crown Prince Asfaw Wossen, which would address the increasing economic and social problems the Ethiopian Empire was facing. Rebels gained control of most of the capital city, Addis Ababa, and took several ministers and other important people hostage.

The coup was put down following a violent confrontation with the imperial army and air force. After its initial success, the majority of the military and populace quickly aligned against the coup, and by 17 December loyalists had regained control of Addis Ababa. At least 300 people were killed during the coup, including most of the conspirators.

The coup attempt is considered the most serious threat to Haile Selassie's rule between 1941 and his deposition in 1974 during the Ethiopian Revolution.

== Background ==
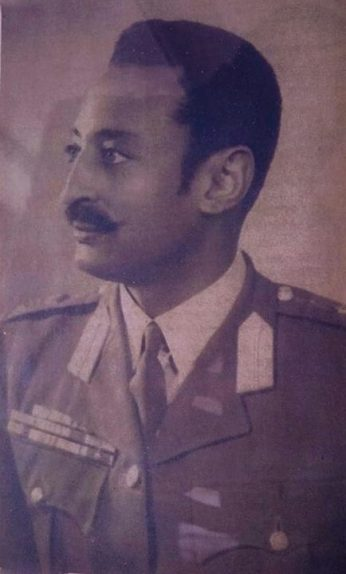
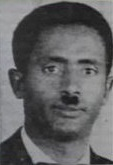
General Mengistu (left) and Germame Neway (right)

In the 1950s, discontent grew within Ethiopia toward Emperor Haile Selassie's imperial regime. Many members of the aristocracy became frustrated with the empire's stagnation and limitations. The government's repression and prohibition of autonomous organizations stifled any reformist movements within the ruling class. Although many elites recognized the need for serious reform, Emperor Selassie refused to tolerate any form of protest, especially organized efforts. Even influential Ethiopian families feared the regime's extensive network of spies and the emperor's potential reaction to dissent, creating an atmosphere of fear among the ruling class.

Germame Neway, widely seen as the motivator of the coup, was a high-ranking civil servant who was serving as a district governor in Ethiopia's provinces. Germame was a progressive and activist governor who was frustrated in his attempts to improve the standard of living of the subjects in the districts he was assigned to govern, and grew to resent the absolutist and feudal central government under Emperor Haile Selassie. When Germame had attempted to encourage the Oromo inhabitants of Wellamu to build roads, bridges, and schools, he was opposed by the local landlords who agitated for his replacement. Germame was then reassigned to Jijiga, where he "was immediately confronted with the abject poverty and underdevelopment of the region and with obvious signs of official neglect." Historian Bahru Zewde concluded, "The obstruction he encountered even in these remote posts convinced him of the need for change, and he began to work with his brother to that end."

Germame then managed to persuade his brother, Brigadier-General Mengistu Neway, that a successful military coup against the current government was feasible. Mengistu was vital to the success of Germame's plan because he commanded the Kebur Zabangna, the Emperor's imperial guard whose members were expected to follow orders without question, and had connections throughout the Ethiopian armed forces. Two more important members, Colonel Warqenah Gabayahu, imperial chief of security, and Brigadier-General Tsege Dibu, the commissioner of the police force, were recruited to form a clandestine "Council of the Revolution", and the group began planning their move. According to Paul Henze, fearing that their plans had already leaked out, the conspirators rushed into action when the Emperor departed on a state visit to Brazil without sufficient planning. According to the memoirs of John H. Spencer, Makonnen Habte-Wold had been seriously suspicious of Colonel Warqenah's activities two years prior to the attempted coup, and only five months before the conspirators acted Makonnen confided his renewed suspicions about both the Colonel as well as Brigadier-General Tsege to Spencer.

A year before the coup, Colonel Warqenah sought out one of the many Israeli military advisors working with the Ethiopian army. Warqenah revealed that the Emperor feared a potential military uprising that could lead to a march on Addis Ababa. He requested the advisor to identify weak points on a map of the capital and suggest defensive strategies for the imperial guard. This very map was later discovered among Warqenah's possessions after the failed coup attempt to overthrow Haile Selassie.

While emperor Selassie was on a state visit to Brazil, the commander of the Imperial Guard, Mengistu Neway and his brother Germame Neway attempted a coup d'état.

== Coup ==
On the evening of Tuesday, 13 December 1960, the group duped several Ministers of the Imperial Crown and other important political personages into coming to Guenete Leul Palace in the capital, Addis Ababa, for an emergency meeting. They then were taken hostage, including Prime Minister Ras Abebe Aregai. At the same time, followers of Colonel Warqenah occupied the central bank, the radio station, and the Ministry of Finance. The Kebur Zabagna surrounded the other army bases in and around the capital. Before dawn, telephone exchanges were seized and Addis Ababa airport was under control of the bodyguards, who banned all flights. Tanks occupied strategic positions around the capital and by days end most of the imperial family and high ranking officials had been seized.

An Israeli radio operator aboard the aircraft transporting Haile Selassie during his trip to Brazil relayed news of the coup. Tel Aviv advised the Emperor to land in Liberia, where Mossad chief Isser Harel hurried to meet him. The Israelis also advised Ethiopian paratroop commanders, who had been trained in Israel, to secure the Addis Ababa airport in preparation for Selassie's return. Meanwhile, Tel Aviv directed all Israeli officials in Ethiopia to coordinate with the governor of Eritrea to facilitate the Emperor's arrival in Asmara.

=== Crown Prince Asfaw's address ===
The next morning, after the members of the coup had secured control of most of Addis Ababa, Crown Prince Asfaw Wossen read a proclamation on national radio. It is disputed whether Asfaw's reading was sincere or coerced. The broadcast was the first time an Ethiopian leader had ever publicly decried the nations chronic social and economic problems. The crown prince declared that life for the average Ethiopian had not changed in three millennia and announced the masses were losing their patience. He proceeded to compare Ethiopia's lack of progress with some of the newly independent African states, stating the Ethiopia was being left behind. Prince Asfaw stressed further that the new government had his support and the backing of Ethiopia.

The proclamation also announced the formation of a new government under the Crown Prince, and promised the start of a new era. In response, the students of Haile Selassie University demonstrated in support of the new government.

=== Loyalists assert control ===
The leaders of the coup expected this demonstration would convince the other branches of the military to join them. An uneasy 24 hours followed while the conspirators awaited developments. During this period Mengestu and his colleagues issued an 11-point programme of proposed reforms, and appointed as Prime Minister Ras Imru Haile Selassie and Major General Mulugeta Bulli, who was popular in the army, as Chief of Staff. Meanwhile, the loyalists within the military were able to come to a consensus on how to respond to this threat. (Clapham shows that the civilian leaders, who in previous coups that created new rulers of Ethiopia, had been effectively isolated from the military. Makonnen Habte-Wold, whose own intelligence network had uncovered this plot, was unable to do more than send frantic telegrams to his Emperor "until the coup took place and he was captured and shot.") Dejazmach Asrate Medhin Kassa, Major General Mared Mangesha, and the other loyalists spent their time more usefully; they secured the support of the tank squadron and the Imperial Ethiopian Air Force, both stationed within reach of the capital, and made up their initial shortage of troops by airlifting about 1,000 loyal soldiers in from outlying provinces; they also issued leaflets signed by Abuna Basilios, head of the Ethiopian Orthodox Tewahedo Church, which condemned the rebels as anti-religious traitors and called for loyalty to Haile Selassie. These leaflets are believed to have had a great effect on the uncommitted.

=== Clashes ===
Fighting broke out in the afternoon of the next day. Heavily outnumbered, the rebels were slowly driven back. Many ordinary soldiers of the Kebur Zabagna, once they learned they were fighting against the Emperor, lost heart as they had been given to understand that they were fighting for him. Once the fighting started, the inhabitants of the capital gave their support to the loyalists. Before abandoning the capital, Germame and the others turned their machine-guns on their hostages in Genetta Leul palace, killing fifteen of them. Among the victims were Prime Minister Aregai, Makonnen Habte-Wold, Lema Wolde Gabriel and Major General Mulugeta.

=== Coup suppressed ===
The use of force saved Selassie's regime, but in effect turned the Imperial Army into a major pillar of the regime. General Tsege was killed in the fighting; Colonel Warqenah committed suicide. Mengistu and Germame evaded capture until 24 December 1960 when they were surrounded by the army near Mojo. Rather than face capture, Germame committed suicide; Mengistu surrendered. He was publicly hanged in a church square a few months later. Germame's body was brought to Addis Ababa and hanged as well, as a manner of demonstrating the Emperor's resolve. Official casualty figures state that at least 300 people were killed, many of them civilians caught in the street fighting; Christopher Clapham considers these figures "likely to be underestimates", noting in a footnote that The East African Standard in Nairobi, in what was then Kenya Colony, estimated about 2,000 dead and wounded in its 20 December 1960 story.

== Aftermath ==
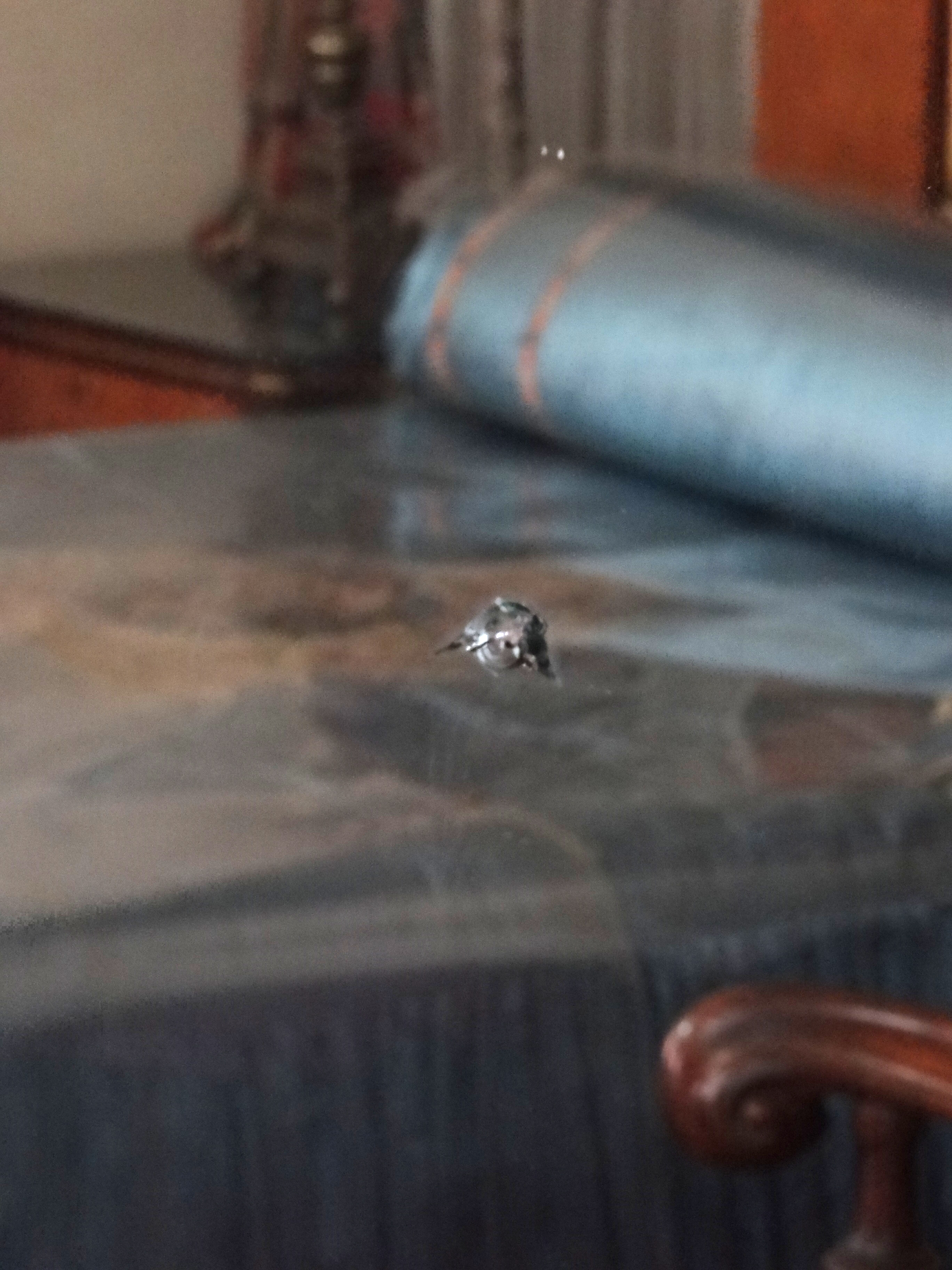
A bullet hole from the 1960 coup, on a mirror in a display of furniture from Haile Selassie's palace (Ethnological Museum, Addis Ababa)

By elevating the political importance of the military during the coup attempt, the emperor became exclusively dependent on their loyalty for survival going forward. This made the stability of the imperial regime precarious, as any sign of discontent within the armed forces could threaten Selassie's survival. The emperor attempted to placate the military over the following decade, with the effect of enhancing the militaries awareness of their growing power and political importance. The threat to imperial government rule caused a change in the emperor's behaviour: after reorganising his government and appointing the Tsehafi Taezaz ('Minister of the Pen'), Aklilu Habte-Wold, as Prime Minister, Haile Selassie "gave less attention to domestic affairs and devoted more time to foreign affairs, making a place for himself in the Pan-African movement and championing decolonization. ... Not to be overshadowed by many of the new personalities on the African scene – Nkrumah, Sekou Toure, Kenyatta, Nyerere – he continued to take a leading role in Pan-African politics."

The loyalty of Ethiopian paratrooper forces, trained in Israel, played a critical role in the swift suppression of the insurrection, with Israeli advisors providing guidance on how to respond during the crisis. Despite their role in helping loyalist forces assert control, the Israelis were deeply embarrassed by the revelation that the main coup plotters had maintained regular contact with their military advisors in the period leading up to the coup. While some within the Emperor's inner circle harbored suspicions about Israel's involvement, Haile Selassie himself believed that Israel was in favor of stability rather than revolution in Ethiopia and had moved in support of him. The Israelis argued to the Ethiopians that the coup plotters had a 'Nasserite spirit'. Bahru Zewde says Bulli's colleagues "more than half-expected" him to emulate Gamal Abdel Nasser's 1952 Egyptian coup.

Zewde sees the coup as a precursor to the Ethiopian Revolution of 1974:

The torch of change that the rebels had kindled was not extinguished with their physical elimination. On the contrary, it sparked a more outspoken and radical opposition to the regime. This can be seen in some of the underground leaflets that began to circulate soon after the end of the coup. They had such uncompromising motifs as "Better be a lion for a day and die than live the life of a lamb for a thousand days", "There is no solution without blood", and "What is sinful is to be ruled by despots, not to rise against them." Above all, the students became the true heirs of the rebels. They had come out on the streets in support of the rebels in 1960. Thereafter, they gave breadth and coherence to the opposition that the rebels had conceived and executed in such a confused manner. As for the imperial régime, unprepared to concede reform, it condemned itself to being swept away by revolution.

Edmond Keller adds that following the coup, "rather than being able to dictate comfortably the rate and direction of change, the emperor was placed ever more on the defensive, having to work harder to mediate the demands of increasingly politically significant social groupings." Keller also disagrees with the assertion that the leaders of the coup were the only organised group critical of the imperial monarchy and its policies, pointing to nationalist organisations coalescing among the Oromo, Somali, Eritreans, and Tigreans, noting that "these pockets of opposition might never have emerged if the emperor's policies had been more sensitively directed at building legitimacy among the masses rather than simply at securing compliance or acquiescence to laws and policies." Selassie successfully avoided another coup attempt thanks to a tight system of control and his effective divide and rule policies, though it was clear that the regime was in a precarious position.
