= Mengistu Neway =

Ethiopian commander and 1960 Ethiopian coup d'état perpetrator (1919–1961)

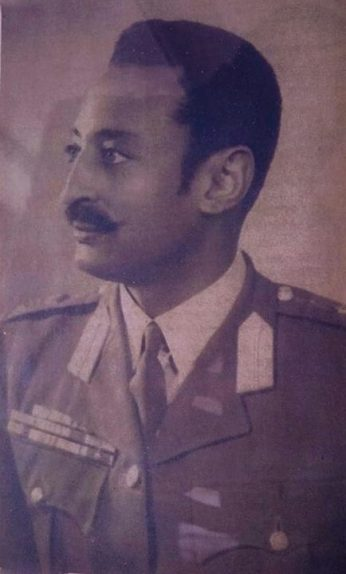
Mengistu Neway

Mengistu Neway (1919 – 30 March 1961) was an Ethiopian military officer and commander of the Imperial Guard during the reign of Emperor Haile Selassie. He is noted for being one of the early dissidents of the Emperor's regime and for organizing the 1960 coup attempt with his younger brother Germame Neway, for which he was sentenced to death.

Mengistu and his brother were members of a well-established noble lineage called Moja, an Shewan family clan which had supplied the Ethiopian government a number of soldiers and governors for a century, but at the time of the 1960 coup had fallen out of favor. Ethiopian observers, noting that the Moja had a tradition for favoring reforms, later speculated that their coup could be explained in terms of Ethiopian lineage politics. Christopher Clapham rejects this interpretation, noting "this is at best an oversimplification, in that some Mojas remained loyal to the Emperor, while several non-Mojas were actively involved; and there has been no evidence that Mengestu and Germame took the lead because of their Moja ancestry." Clapham's opinion as an outsider however reflects a peripheral and nondefinitive insight. Members of the Ethiopian nobility and even royal houses have been known to choose and to switch between feuding sides in power struggles. The Moja had been instrumental as Kingmakers in Menelik II's, Zauditu I's and Eyasu V's ascent. Eyasu's offensive and insulting attitude towards Fit. Habtegiorgis Dinegde, Minister of War, Justice, and above all husband to Woiz. Altayework Habte, one of the Moja's three principal heads was the last straw in not only Habtegiorgis but many Moja allies such as Dedj's Wordofa Chengere, Dedj. Abebe Tufa leaving the Eyasu camp.

== Early life ==
Mengistu was of ethnic Oromo descent. He received his earliest education at the St. George school in Addis Ababa, a Swiss-run school which accepted its first students in September 1929. He then became a cadet in the first class of the Oletta Military Academy, which opened January 1935; this first class of cadets could not complete their education due to the advent of the Second Italo-Abyssinian War. With his classmates, under the leadership of the Swedish Captain Viking Tamm, headmaster of Olette, they attempted to hold the Pass of Tarmaber against the advancing Italians after the decisive Battle of Maychew (31 March 1936), but were forced to retreat to Addis Ababa. The Oletta cadets then split up into two groups: one joined Ras Imru Haile Selassie at Gore; the other, which included Mengistu, had joined Aberra Kassa and took part in the Battle of Addis Ababa, where a bold attempt to recapture the capital failed. When Aberra appeared ready to submit to the Italians, the 20 or 30 surviving cadets left him to join the Arbegnoch led by Haile Mariam Mammo in Mulu. After Haile Mariam had been killed fighting the Italians at Gorfo, near Addis Ababa (November 1938), he made his way to Khartoum where he trained with his fellow cadets Asrate Medhin Kassa, Mered Mangesha, Aman Michael Andom and Mulugeta Bulli.

After Emperor Haile Selassie returned to Ethiopia, Mengistu became a colonel in the Ethiopian army, and in April 1956 he was made commander of the Imperial Bodyguard, replacing General Mulugeta Bulli. Considering his later role in the attempted 1960 coup, a number of writers have pointed out the irony that he served as executioner of at least one group of the participants in the 1943 Gojjame rebellion led by former Arbegna Belay Zelleke, and was entrusted with apprehending the conspirators in the 1951 attempt to assassinate Emperor Haile Selassie which was led by another former Arbegna Nagash Bazabeh.

== 1960 coup ==
With the support of the Police Commissioner Brigadier General Tsige Dibu and the Chief of Security Colonel Werqneh Gebeyehu, on the evening of 13 December 1960, the plotters managed to take hostage several ministers and other important figures present at Guenet Leul palace in Addis Ababa while the Emperor was out of the country. The next day, units of the Imperial Bodyguard surrounded the principal military bases in the capital and took control of the radio station. The Emperor was proclaimed deposed and his son Crown Prince Asfaw Wossen was appointed in his place. However, the rest of the military and the Ethiopian Church rallied to support the Emperor, and by 19 December the coup was crushed, although 15 of the 21 notables taken hostage were killed, including Mulugeta Buli. The hostages were machine gunned in the Green Salon just before the coup leaders retreated from the Palace compound. Among the important personages executed by the Mengistu's forces were Ras Abebe Aregai, the leading anti-fascist resistance leader against the Italian occupation; Ras Seyoum Mangasha Prince of Tigray, Abba Hanna Jimma, the Emperor's confessor, almoner, and administrator of his personal household; Dejazmatch Letyibelu, a prominent resistance leader during the Italian occupation and nobleman with close ties to the Emperor; Lidj Lema Wolde Gabriel, Mayor of Addis Abeba at the time and several others.

General Tsege was killed in the fighting; Colonel Werqneh committed suicide. Mengistu and Germame evaded capture until 24 December 1960 when they were surrounded by the army near Mojo. Rather than face capture, Germame committed suicide; Mengistu surrendered. He was put on trial which cause a sensation as he appeared in open court completely unrepentant. Accused of slaughtering the Emperor's loyal servants, General Mengistu is said to have replied "I did not kill His Majesty's friends, I only wiped the dirt from his eyes". It is said the Emperor was inclined to commute his death sentence to life in prison, but the powerful families of the victims of the Green Salon massacre were outraged at the idea, and the Emperor allowed the death penalty to be carried out. General Mengistu was hanged a few months later, on 30 March 1961.

His second wife and widow, Woizero (Mrs.) Kefey Taffere, died in April 1999 having subsequently remarried. Woizero Kefey as a descendant of the Zagwe dynasty, was a member of the Wagshum family, which by the Imperial decree of Yikuno Amlak I are only second to the restored Solomonic Dynasty in their claims to the Imperial Throne of Ethiopia. She was a member of the upper levels of the Ethiopian aristocracy. General Mengistu is survived by his two sons, Neway Mengistu and Germame Mengistu.
