= Guenete Leul Palace =

Palace in Addis Ababa, Ethiopia

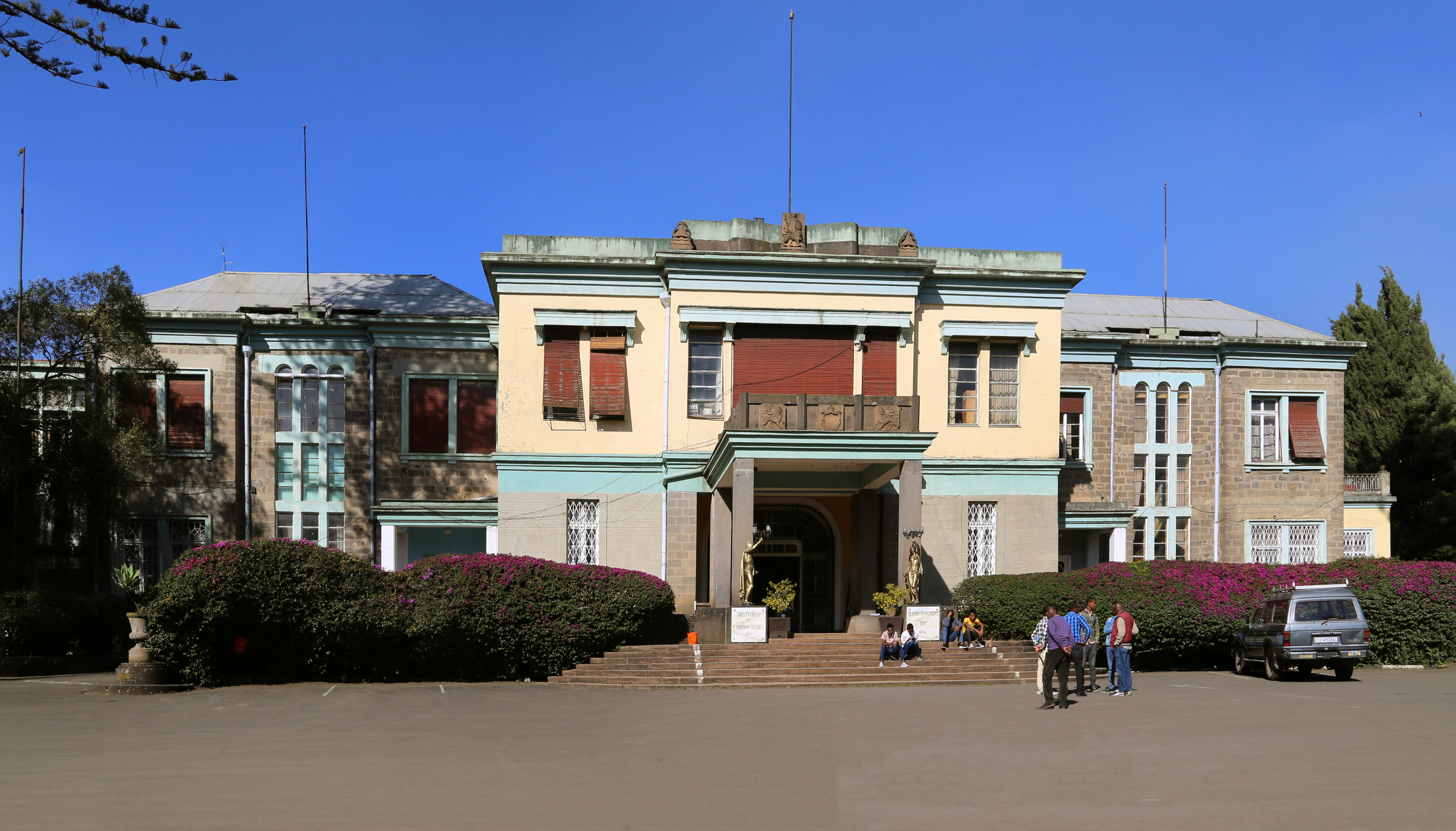
- Guenete Leul Palace in 2018
- Interactive map of the Guenete Leul Palace area

General information
- Location: Addis Ababa, Ethiopia
- Coordinates: 9°02′48″N 38°45′28″E
- Completed: 1930

The Guenete Leul Palace ("Paradise of Princes") is a palace in Addis Ababa, Ethiopia. It was built by Emperor Haile Selassie in 1930. The Emperor and his family made the palace their main residence, but the seat of government remained at the Imperial Palace.

== History ==
The palace was built between 1930 and 1932 at the behest of Haile Selassie, who intended it as an imperial residence, replacing the Palace of Menelik II, which remained the seat of government; already in 1935 the building hosted Crown Prince Gustaf Adolf of Sweden (later king Gustaf VI Adolf) during his state visit to Ethiopia.

Following the Italian conquest of Ethiopia in 1936, the building became the residence of the viceroys of Italian East Africa; after Pietro Badoglio, Rodolfo Graziani moved there, who, right in the gardens of the palace, on 19 February 1937, on the occasion of the ceremony to celebrate the birth of the firstborn of Vittorio Emanuele, Prince of Naples, was wounded with 50 other people during a dynamite attack which also caused 7 deaths. The event triggered a violent reprisal by the Italians, known as Yekatit 12.

The last viceroy to occupy the building was Prince Amedeo, Duke of Aosta. After the collapse of the Italian East Africa, in 1941 Emperor Haile Selassie returned to power and re-established himself in the palace.

In 1960, during the 1960 Ethiopian coup attempt, government officials were imprisoned and killed in the Green Hall of the building, while a violent battle broke out in the park between the army and the rebels. At the end of the clash, Haile Selassie decided to move into the new Jubilee Palace and donate the property to Addis Ababa University.

The structure, renamed Ras Makonnen Palace in honor of the emperor's father, became the seat of the Ethnographic Museum and initially also of the library of the Institute of Ethiopian Studies, while in the large garden numerous buildings were constructed, including dormitories for students, libraries and laboratories.
