= Germame Neway =

Ethiopian politician; the 1960 Ethiopian coup d'etat perpetrator (1924–1960)

Dejazemach Germame Neway
- ገርማሜ ንዋይ
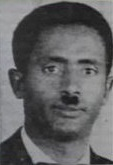
- Born: 14 August 1924; Addis Ababa, Ethiopian Empire
- Died: 24 December 1960 (aged 36); Mojo, Shewa Province, Ethiopian Empire
- Cause of death: Suicide by firearm
- Education: Wisconsin University (BA); Columbia University (MA)
- Years active: 1958–1960
- Known for: 1960 Ethiopian coup d'etat perpetrator

Germame Neway (Ge'ez: ገርማሜ ንዋይ; 14 August 1924 – 24 December 1960) was an Ethiopian politician known for his role in 1960 Ethiopian coup d'état attempt. He was governor of Wolayita province, and the Somali province. Germame was a member of the aristocracy of Shewa. He died by suicide on 24 December 1960.

== Background ==
Of ethnic Oromo from Mojo clan heritage. Germame was born in Addis Ababa in 1924. After his primary and secondary education in the prestigious Teferi Mekonnen School and Haile Selassie I School in Addis Ababa. He then went to the United States for further studies. He graduated with a Bachelor of Arts at the University of Wisconsin System and Master of Arts in social science at Columbia University in 1954.

Germame was a progressive and activist governor who was frustrated in his attempts to improve the standard of living of the subjects in the districts he was assigned to govern, and grew to resent the absolutist and feudal central government under Emperor Haile Selassie.

In 1958, Germame was appointed as the governor of Wolaita province, but he stayed only for one year here, and in 1959 transformed to govern the Ogaden region. Also in this region, Germame led only for one year. Though he led a reform in these two places, the people opposed his administration and that put him into short term of leadership. When Germame had attempted to encourage the Oromo inhabitants of Wellamu to build roads, bridges, and schools, he was opposed by the local landlords who agitated for his replacement. Germame was then reassigned to Jijiga, where he "was immediately confronted with the abject poverty and underdevelopment of the region and with obvious signs of official neglect." The obstructions Germame encountered even in remote posts within the empire convinced him of the need to overthrow Selassie's regime.

== Coup ==
Gemame became grieved for the action that taken upon him by Haile Selassie. Following this he also participated in the 1960 Ethiopian coup d'état attempt. Germame committed suicide on 24 December 1960 when he and his brother Mengistu Neway, were surrounded by the army near Mojo, Ethiopia.
