= Selassie =

Selassie (Ge'ez: ሥላሴ, romanized: Silassē, lit. 'Trinity') may refer to:

== Amharic name ==
Notable people with the name include:

- Amha Selassie (1916–1997), former Emperor of Ethiopia
- Araya Selassie Yohannes (1870–1888), Yohannes IV's son
- Ayori Selassie, American software engineer
- Bereket Habte Selassie (born 1932), Eritrean author
- Cynthia Selassie, American chemist
- Darge Sahle Selassie (1830–1900), Amharic military personnel
- Ermias Sahle Selassie (born 1960), Prince Sahle Selassie's son
- Fikre Selassie Wogderess (died 2020), former Prime Minister of Ethiopia
- Gugsa Araya Selassie (1885–1932), Haile Selassie Gugsa's father
- Haile Selassie (disambiguation), multiple people
- Heruy Wolde Selassie (1878–1938), Amharic writer and former Prime Minister of Foreign Affairs of Ethiopia
- Mickaël Bethe-Selassié (1951–2020), Amharic artist
- Prince Sahle Selassie (1931–1962), Amharic prince
- Princess Ijigayehu Amha Selassie (1936–1976), Amharic member of the Solomonic dynasty
- Sahle Selassie (1795–1847), Amharic author
- Taye Atske Selassie (born 1956), Amharic diplomat and politician
- Theodor Gebre Selassie (born 1986), Czech former footballer
- Wolde Selassie (1736–1816), Ras of the Tigray
- Zera Yacob Amha Selassie (born 1953), Amharic member of the Solomonic dynasty

== Other ==
- Narga Selassie, church in northern Ethiopia
- Selassie Ibrahim (born 1978), Ghanaian actress and film producer
- Selassie Lake, lake in Ontario

== See also ==
- Salesi
- Selasi
