= Zewde Gebre-Sellassie =

Ethiopian noble, historian and politician (1926–2008)

Dejazmatch Zewde Gebre-Sellassie (Amharic: ዘውዴ ገብረ ሥላሴ; 12 October 1926 – 15 December 2008) was an Ethiopian nobleman, historian, and former Deputy Prime Minister of Ethiopia. He was born in the village of Galdu, in the subdistrict of Mecca, to the north-west of Addis Ababa where his father was relegated.

== Early life ==
Zewde's father was Dejazmatch Gebre Selassie Baria Gabr (governor of Adwa) and his mother was Leult Wolete Israel Seyoum. His sister was Leult Ijigayehu Amha Selassie, his grandfather was Ras Seyum Mengesha, and his wife was Woizero Alem Tsehai Araya. He received his rudimentary education in Addis Ababa under a tutor, and went to school in Jerusalem and Cairo respectively where his mother stayed during the Fascist occupation of Ethiopia. After the liberation, he enrolled at the Haile Selassie I secondary school in Addis Ababa and subsequently joined the University of Exeter, England, where he studied English literature. This was followed by legal training at St. Anthony's College, Oxford where he became a senior member of the college from 1963 to 1971, at the conclusion of which he was called to the Bar, Lincoln's Inn, London. After a long interval, during which he held various public offices in Ethiopia, he returned to Oxford and earned his PhD in the composite field of history, politics and economics.

== Career ==
After his return home in the early 1950s, he held various offices, including that of Deputy Prime Minister.

Under the imperial government he held the following positions:

- Economic attache, later Head of Press, Information and Administration Division, Ministry of Foreign Affairs, 1951–53
- Director-General of Maritime Affairs, 1953–55
- Deputy Minister, Ministry of Public Works, Transport and Civil Aviation, 1955–57
- Mayor and Governor of Addis Ababa, 1957–59
- Ambassador to Somalia, 1959–60
- Minister of Justice, 1961–63
- Permanent Representative to the United Nations, 1972–74
- Minister of the Interior, March – May 1974
- Minister of Foreign Affairs, May – November 1974

In November 1974, the Provisional Military Administrative Council's (Derg) summary execution of high government officials of the previous regime forced Zewde to go into exile. He eventually became vice-president of the United Nations Economic and Social Council, and subsequently worked for several years as advisor to the secretariat of the United Nations. Throughout his service, he received national honors from at least seven sovereign states, including the Federal Republic of Germany. Together with some other prominent Ethiopians, he attempted to mediate between Ethiopia and Eritrea in 1998.

== Publications ==
- Gabre-Sellassie, Zewde (1975). Yohannes IV of Ethiopia: A Political Biography. Oxford, England: Clarendon Press. ISBN 1-56902-042-6.
- የኢትዮጵያ እና የኤርትራ ግጭት መንሥኤ እና መፍትሔ (The Conflict of Ethiopia and Eritrea: Causes and Solutions) (Addis Ababa University Press, 2015)
- Gebre-Sellassie, Zewde (2006). The blue Nile and its basins : an issue of international concern. Addis Ababa, Ethiopia: Forum for Social Studies.
- Gabre-Sellassie, Zewde (1971). The process of re-unification of the Ethiopian Empire, 1868-1889. University of Oxford.
