= List of knights of the Order of the Elephant =

This is a list of the knights of the Order of the Elephant, the highest Danish order of chivalry, since its foundation by Christian V in 1693.

== By reign ==
Persons in bold characters are alive members

=== Frederik III (1648–1670) ===
| Image | Name | Life | Date | Country | Notes |
|---|---|---|---|---|---|
| | Prince George of Denmark | 1653–1708 | 2 April 1653 | Denmark | Later prince consort of Great Britain and Duke of Cumberland |
| | Count Frederik of Ahlefeldt-Rixingen | 1623–1686 | 11 October 1663 | Denmark | Later Grand Chancellor of Denmark (1676–1686) |

=== Christian V (1670–1699) ===
| Image | Name | Life | Date | Country | Notes |
|---|---|---|---|---|---|
| | Johann Adolf, Duke of Schleswig-Holstein-Sonderburg-Plön | 1634–1704 | 25 October 1671 | Denmark | |
| | August, Duke of Schleswig-Holstein-Sonderburg-Norburg-Plön | 1635–1699 | 29 May 1676 | Denmark | |
| | Friedrich VII, Margrave of Baden-Durlach | 1647–1709 | 26 July 1682 | Margraviate of Baden-Durlach | |

=== Frederik IV (1699–1730) ===
| Image | Name | Life | Date | Country | Notes |
|---|---|---|---|---|---|
| | Prince Friedrich of Hesse-Kassel | 1676–1751 | 27 May 1700 | Landgraviate of Hesse-Kassel | Later Fredrik, Prince consort of Sweden; Fredrik I, King of Sweden; and Friedrich I, Landgrave of Hesse-Kassel |
| | Friedrich Wilhelm, Duke of Mecklenburg-Schwerin | 1675–1713 | 28 February 1703 | Duchy of Mecklenburg-Schwerin | |
| | Peter I, Tsar of Russia | 1762–1725 | 18 February 1713 | Tsardom of Russia | Later Peter I, Emperor of Russia |
| | Prince Alexander Danilovich Menshikov | 1673–1729 | 22 February 1710 | Tsardom of Russia | Field Marshal of the Russian Imperial Army |
| | Prince Anikita Ivanovich Repnin | 1668–1726 | 16 June 1713 | Tsardom of Russia | Russian general |
| | Prince Vasily Vladimirovich Dolgorukov | 1667–1746 | 16 June 1713 | Tsardom of Russia | Russian general |

=== Christian VI (1730–1746) ===
| Image | Name | Life | Date | Country | Notes |
|---|---|---|---|---|---|
| | Karl I, Landgrave of Hesse-Philippsthal | 1682–1770 | 6 June 1731 | Landgraviate of Hesse-Philippsthal | |
| | Adolf Friedrich III, Duke of Mecklenburg-Strelitz | 1686–1752 | 6 June 1731 | Duchy of Mecklenburg-Strelitz | |
| | Christian Ludwig, Hereditary Prince of Mecklenburg-Schwerin | 1683–1756 | 30 April 1737 | Duchy of Mecklenburg-Strelitz | Later Christian Ludwig II, Duke of Mecklenburg-Schwerin |

=== Frederik V (1746–1766) ===
| Image | Name | Life | Date | Country | Notes |
|---|---|---|---|---|---|
| | Adolf Fredrik, King of Sweden | 1710–1771 | 4 September 1752 | Sweden | |
| | Friedrich III, Duke of Mecklenburg-Schwerin | 1717–1785 | 28 September 1762 | Duchy of Mecklenburg-Schwerin | |
| | Baron Carl Otto Hamilton of Hageby | 1704–1770 | 24 December 1763 | Sweden | Member of the Privy Council of Sweden |

=== Christian VII (1766–1808) ===
| Image | Name | Life | Date | Country | Notes |
|---|---|---|---|---|---|
| | Gustaf, Crown Prince of Sweden | 1746–1972 | 19 April 1766 | Sweden | Later Gustaf III, King of Sweden |
| | Frederik, Crown Prince of Denmark | 1768–1839 | 28 January 1768 | Denmark | Later Frederik VI, King of Denmark and Norway, and Sovereign of the Order |
| | Karl Ludwig, Hereditary Prince of Baden-Durlach | 1755–1801 | 29 January 1769 | Margraviate of Baden | Later Karl Ludwig, Hereditary Prince of Baden (unified) |
| | Ludwig, Hereditary Prince of Mecklenburg-Schwerin | 1725–1778 | 11 October 1774 | Duchy of Mecklenburg-Schwerin | |
| | Duke Ernst Gottlob of Mecklenburg-Strelitz | 1742–1814 | 20 January 1776 | Duchy of Mecklenburg-Schwerin | |
| | Gustaf Adolf, Crown Prince of Sweden | 1778–1837 | 1 November 1786 | Sweden | Later Gustaf IV Adolf, King of Sweden; Abdicated 1809 |
| | Prince Christian Frederik of Denmark | 1786–1848 | 16 November 1787 | Denmark | Later Christian VIII, King of Denmark and Norway, and Sovereign of the Order |
| | Prince Frederik of Hesse-Kassel | 1771–1845 | 1801 | Landgraviate of Hesse-Kassel | Later Governor-General of Norway (1810–1813) and Schleswig and Holstein (1836–1842) |
| | Prince Christian of Hesse-Kassel | 1776–1814 | 1803 | Landgraviate of Hesse-Kassel | |
| | Prince Alexander Borisovich Kurakin | 1752–1818 | 9 February 1808 | Russian Empire | Acting Chancellor of the Russian Empire (1801–1802) |

=== Frederik VI (1808–1839) ===
| Image | Name | Life | Date | Country | Notes |
|---|---|---|---|---|---|
| | Napoléon I, Emperor of the French | 1769–1821 | 18 May 1808 | French Empire | |
| | Alexander I, Emperor of Russia | 1777–1825 | 2 July 1808 | Russian Empire | |
| | Lodewijk I, King of Holland | 1778–1846 | 29 August 1808 | Kingdom of Holland | |
| | Jean-Baptiste Bernadotte | 1763–1844 | 10 October 1808 | French Empire | Marshal of France; Later Karl XIV Johan, King of Sweden and Norway |
| | Carl XIII, King of Sweden | 1748–1818 | 10 February 1810 | Sweden | Later also Carl II, King of Norway |
| | Jean-Pierre, Count of Montalivet | 1766–1823 | 4 February 1811 | French Empire | Minister of the Interior of the French Empire |

=== Christian VIII (1839–1848) ===
| Image | Name | Life | Date | Country | Notes |
|---|---|---|---|---|---|
| | Friedrich Wilhelm, Crown Prince of Prussia | 1795–1861 | 19 January 1840 | Kingdom of Prussia | Later Friedrich Wilhelm IV, King of Prussia |
| | Adolf, Duke of Nassau | 1817–1905 | 1 February 1840 | Duchy of Nassau | Later Adolphe, Grand Duke of Luxembourg |
| | Prince Friedrich Wilhelm of Hesse-Kassel | 1820–1884 | 28 June 1840 | Electorate of Hesse | Later Friedrich Wilhelm II, Landgrave of Hesse |
| | Leopold IV, Duke of Anhalt-Dessau | 1794–1871 | 25 December 1840 | Duchy of Anhalt-Dessau | Later Leopold IV, Duke of Anhalt |
| | Prince Wilhelm of Prussia | 1797–1888 | 27 February 1841 | Kingdom of Prussia | Later Wilhelm I, German Emperor and King of Prussia |
| | Fernando II, King of Portugal and the Algarves | 1816–1885 | 12 April 1841 | Duchy of Saxe-Coburg and Gotha; Kingdom of Portugal | Born Prince of Saxe-Coburg-Saalfeld, later Prince of Saxe-Coburg and Gotha |
| | Duke Gustav Wilhelm of Mecklenburg-Schwerin | 1781–1851 | 14 July 1841 | Grand Duchy of Mecklenburg-Schwerin | |
| | Friedrich Franz II, Grand Duke of Mecklenburg-Schwerin | 1823–1883 | 5 April 1842 | Grand Duchy of Mecklenburg-Schwerin | |
| | Prince Albert of Saxe-Coburg and Gotha | 1819–1861 | 10 January 1843 | Duchy of Saxe-Coburg and Gotha; United Kingdom | |
| | Prince Christian of Schleswig-Holstein-Sonderburg-Glücksburg | 1818–1906 | 22 June 1843 | Denmark | Later Christian IX, King of Denmark, and Sovereign of the Order |
| | Prince Friedrich of Schleswig-Holstein-Sonderburg-Glücksburg | 1814–1885 | 18 September 1843 | Denmark | Later Friedrich, Duke of Schleswig-Holstein-Sonderburg-Glücksburg |
| | Prince Pyotr Mikhailovich Volkonsky | 1776–1852 | 28 January 1844 | Russian Empire | Minister of the Imperial Court of the Russian Empire (1826–1852) |
| | Grand Duke Constantine Nikolaievich of Russia | 1827–1892 | 23 July 1844 | Russian Empire | |
| | Louis Philippe I, King of the French | 1773–1850 | 30 April 1846 | Kingdom of France | |
| | Leopold I, King of the Belgians | 1790–1865 | 16 June 1846 | Duchy of Saxe-Coburg and Gotha; Belgium | Born Prince of Saxe-Coburg-Saalfeld, later Prince of Saxe-Coburg and Gotha |
| | François Guizot | 1787–1874 | 27 June 1846 | Kingdom of France | Minister of Foreign Affairs of the Kingdom of France (1840–1848); Later Prime Minister of the Kingdom of France (1847–1848) |
| | Élie Decazes, Duke of Decazes and Glücksbierg | 1780–1860 | 27 June 1846 | Kingdom of France | |
| | Carl, Crown Prince of Sweden and Norway | 1826–1872 | 16 July 1846 | United Kingdoms of Sweden and Norway | Later Carl XV, King of Sweden and Norway |
| | Otto, King of Greece | 1815–1867 | 2 November 1846 | Kingdom of Bavaria; Kingdom of Greece | Born Prince of Bavaria |
| | Prince Gustaf, Duke of Uppland | 1827–1852 | 27 September 1847 | United Kingdoms of Sweden and Norway | |
| | Pedro II, Emperor of Brazil | 1825–1891 | 29 March 1847 | Empire of Brazil | |

=== Frederik VII (1848–1863) ===
| Image | Name | Life | Date | Country | Notes |
|---|---|---|---|---|---|
| | Friedrich Wilhelm I, Elector of Hesse | 1802–1875 | 29 January 1848 | Electorate of Hesse | |
| | Francisco de Asís, King of Spain | 1822–1902 | 21 May 1848 | Spain | |
| | Prince Alexander Sergeyevich Menshikov | 1787–1869 | 2 June 1848 | Russian Empire | Governor-General of Finland (1831–1855) |
| | Prince Oscar, Duke of Östergötland | 1829–1907 | 3 June 1848 | United Kingdoms of Sweden and Norway | Later Oscar II, King of Sweden |
| | Baron Gustaf Algernon Stierneld | 1791–1868 | 2 October 1848 | United Kingdoms of Sweden and Norway | Prime Ministers for Foreign Affairs of the United Kingdoms of Sweden and Norway (1838–1842; 1848–1856) |
| | Franz Joseph I, Emperor of Austria | 1830–1916 | 17 January 1849 | Austrian Empire | |
| | Willem III, King of the Netherlands | 1817–1890 | 24 August 1849 | The Netherlands | |
| | Prince Felix of Schwarzenberg | 1800–1852 | 28 October 1849 | Austrian Empire | Minister-President of the Austrian Empire (1848–1852) |
| | Count Joseph Radetzky von Radetz | 1766–1858 | 28 October 1849 | Austrian Empire | |
| | Georg V, King of Hanover | 1819–1878 | 23 November 1851 | Kingdom of Hanover | |
| | Count Karl Ferdinand von Buol | 1797–1865 | 11 June 1852 | Austrian Empire | Minister of Foreign Affairs of the Austrian Empire (1852–1859) |
| | Otto Theodor von Manteuffel | 1805–1882 | 11 June 1852 | Kingdom of Prussia | Minister-President of the Kingdom of Prussia (1850–1858) |
| | Prince August, Duke of Dalarna | 1831–1873 | 9 June 1852 | United Kingdoms of Sweden and Norway | |
| | Peter II, Grand Duke of Oldenburg | 1827–1900 | 2 April 1853 | Grand Duchy of Oldenburg | |
| | Prince Karl of Prussia | 1801–1883 | 26 May 1853 | Kingdom of Prussia | |
| | Napoléon III, Emperor of the French | 1808–1873 | 2 August 1855 | French Empire | |
| | François Certain de Canrobert | 1809–1895 | 28 November 1855 | French Empire | |
| | Prince Napoléon-Jérôme Bonaparte | 1822–1891 | 24 September 1856 | French Empire | |
| | Prince Alexander Mikhailovich Gorchakov | 1798–1883 | 16 September 1857 | Russian Empire | Minister of Foreign Affairs of the Russian Empire (1856–1882) |
| | Nicholas Alexandrovich, Tsesarevich of Russia | 1843–1865 | 20 September 1859 | Russian Empire | |
| | Muhammad Ali Pasha, Hereditary Prince of Egypt | 1833–1861 | 16 May 1859 | Egyptian Eyalet | |
| | Friedrich Wilhelm, Grand Duke of Mecklenburg-Strelitz | 1819–1904 | 17 October 1860 | Grand Duchy of Mecklenburg-Strelitz | |
| | Prince Frederik of Denmark | 1843–1912 | 3 June 1861 | Denmark | Later Frederik VIII, King of Denmark, and Sovereign of the Order |
| | Vittorio Emanuele II, King of Italy | 1820–1878 | 2 September 1861 | Kingdom of Italy | |
| | George I, King of the Hellenes | 1845–1913 | 6 June 1863 | Kingdom of Greece; Denmark | Born Prince Vilhelm of Denmark |
| | Umberto, Prince of Piedmont | 1844–1900 | 19 August 1863 | Kingdom of Italy | Later Umberto I, King of Italy |
| | Prince Amedeo, Duke of Aosta | 1845–1890 | 19 August 1863 | Kingdom of Italy | Later Amadeo I, King of Spain |

=== Christian IX (1863–1906) ===
| Image | Name | Life | Date | Country | Notes |
|---|---|---|---|---|---|
| | Prince Valdemar of Denmark | 1858–1939 | 15 November 1863 | Denmark | |
| | Albert Edward, Prince of Wales | 1841–1910 | 16 November 1863 | United Kingdom | Later Edward VII, King of the United Kingdom |
| | Prince Johann of Schleswig-Holstein-Sonderburg-Glücksburg | 1825–1911 | 9 March 1864 | Denmark | |
| | Luís I, King of Portugal and the Algarves | 1838–1889 | 18 April 1864 | Kingdom of Portugal | |
| | Count Sergei Grigoryevich Stroganov | 1794–1882 | 11 October 1864 | Russian Empire | |
| | Prince Julius of Schleswig-Holstein-Sonderburg-Glücksburg | 1824–1903 | 13 October 1864 | Denmark | |
| | Christian Frederik Hansen | 1788–1873 | 23 February 1865 | Denmark | Minister of War |
| | Louis-Napoléon, Prince Imperial | 1856–1879 | 11 March 1865 | French Empire | |
| | Alexander Alexandrovich, Tsesarevich of Russia | 1845–1894 | 29 June 1865 | Russian Empire | Later Alexander III, Emperor of Russia |
| | Leopold II, King of the Belgians | 1835–1909 | 9 January 1866 | Belgium | |
| | Maximilian I, Emperor of Mexico | 1832–1867 | 11 January 1866 | Mexican Empire | |
| | Édouard Drouyn de Lhuys | 1805–1881 | 16 May 1866 | French Empire | Ministers of Foreign Affairs of France (1848–1849; 1851; 1852–1855; 1862–1866) |
| | Grand Duke Vladimir Alexandrovich of Russia | 1847–1909 | 14 June 1866 | Russian Empire | |
| | Grand Duke Alexei Alexandrovich of Russia | 1850–1908 | 17 June 1866 | Russian Empire | |
| | Count Vladimir Fyodorovich Adlerberg | 1791–1884 | 26 October 1866 | Russian Empire | |
| | Count Andrei Petrovich Shuvalov | 1802–1873 | 26 October 1866 | Russian Empire | Grand Marshal of the Court of the Emperor of Russia |
| | Prince George, Duke of Cambridge | 1819–1904 | 26 March 1867 | United Kingdom | |
| | Ludwig Wilhelm of Bentheim and Steinfurt | 1812–1890 | 22 November 1867 | Bentheim-Steinfurt | |
| | António José de Ávila | 1807–1881 | 1 May 1868 | Kingdom of Portugal | Prime Minister of the Kingdom of Portugal (1868–1868; 1870–1871; 1877–1878) |
| | Willem, Prince of Orange | 1840–1879 | 12 August 1868 | The Netherlands | |
| | Grand Duke Nicholas Nikolaevich of Russia | 1831–1891 | 1 September 1868 | Russian Empire | |
| | Duke Georg August of Mecklenburg-Strelitz | 1824–1876 | 1 September 1868 | Grand Duchy of Mecklenburg-Strelitz | |
| | Baron Egor Fedorovich Meyendorff | 1794–1879 | 16 September 1868 | Russian Empire | |
| | Patrice Mac-Mahon, Duke of Magenta | 1808–1893 | 4 May 1869 | French Empire | Later President of the French Republic (1873–1879) |
| | Count Gustaf Adolf Vive Sparre af Söfdeborg | 1802–1886 | 28 July 1869 | United Kingdoms of Sweden and Norway | The King of Sweden and Norway's Marshal of the Realm |
| | Carl Wachtmeister | 1823–1871 | 28 July 1869 | United Kingdoms of Sweden and Norway | Ministry of Foreign Affairs of the United Kingdoms of Sweden and Norway |
| | Prince Friedrich Wilhelm of Hesse-Kassel | 1854–1888 | 2 October 1871 | Electorate of Hesse | Later Friedrich Wilhelm III, Landgrave of Hesse |
| | Friedrich I, Duke of Anhalt | 1831–1904 | 22 March 1873 | Duchy of Anhalt | |
| | Prince Arthur of the United Kingdom | 1850–1942 | 2 August 1873 | United Kingdom | Later Duke of Connaught and Strathearn |
| | Friedrich, German Crown Prince and Crown Prince of Prussia | 1831–1888 | 19 August 1873 | German Empire; Kingdom of Prussia | Later Friedrich III, German Emperor and King of Prussia |
| | Rudolf, Crown Prince of Austria | 1858–1889 | 24 November 1873 | Austria-Hungary | |
| | Axel Gustav Adlercreutz | 1821–1880 | 5 March 1874 | United Kingdoms of Sweden and Norway | Prime Minister for Justice of the United Kingdoms of Sweden and Norway |
| | Gustaf, Crown Prince of Sweden and Norway | 1858–1950 | 22 June 1874 | United Kingdoms of Sweden and Norway | Later Gustaf V, King of Sweden |
| | Alexander, Prince of Orange | 1851–1884 | 4 July 1874 | The Netherlands | |
| | Grand Duke Konstantin Konstantinovich of Russia | 1858–1915 | 25 June 1875 | Russian Empire | |
| | Prince Alfred, Duke of Edinburgh | 1844–1930 | 4 July 1875 | United Kingdom | Later Alfred, Duke of Saxe-Coburg and Gotha |
| | Prince Philippe, Count of Flanders | 1837–1905 | 1 November 1875 | Belgium | |
| | Prince Alexander of Hesse and by Rhine | 1823–1888 | 20 November 1875 | Grand Duchy of Hesse and by Rhine | |
| | Louis Decazes de Glücksbierg, Duke of Decazes and Glücksbierg | 1819–1886 | 22 January 1876 | France | Minister of Foreign Affairs of the French Republic |
| | Friedrich Ferdinand, Hereditary Prince of Schleswig-Holstein-Sonderburg-Glücksburg | 1855–1935 | 8 April 1876 | Denmark | Later Friedrich Ferdinand, Duke of Schleswig-Holstein |
| | Wilhelm, Hereditary Prince of Nassau | 1852–1912 | 23 April 1876 | Duchy of Nassau | Later Guillaume IV, Grand Duke of Luxembourg |
| | Grand Duke Sergei Alexandrovich of Russia | 1857–1905 | 3 August 1876 | Russian Empire | |
| | Grand Duke Paul Alexandrovich of Russia | 1860–1919 | 3 August 1876 | Russian Empire | |
| | Count Alexander Vladimirovich Adlerberg | 1818–1888 | 3 August 1876 | Russian Empire | Minister of the Imperial Court of the Russian Empire |
| | Prince Vladimir Andreevich Dolgorukov | 1810–1891 | 14 August 1876 | Russian Empire | |
| | Count Dmitry Alekseyevich Milyutin | 1816–1912 | 19 August 1876 | Russian Empire | Minister of War of the Russian Empire |
| | Friedrich I, Grand Duke of Baden | 1826–1907 | 24 April 1877 | Grand Duchy of Baden | |
| | Alfonso XII, King of Spain | 1857–1885 | 8 January 1878 | Spain | |
| | Albert, King of Saxony | 1828–1902 | 14 June 1878 | Kingdom of Saxony | |
| | Karl Alexander, Grand Duke of Saxe-Weimar-Eisenach | 1818–1901 | 1 July 1878 | Grand Duchy of Saxe-Weimar-Eisenach | |
| | Ludwig IV, Grand Duke of Hesse and by Rhine | 1837–1892 | 23 September 1878 | Grand Duchy of Hesse and by Rhine | |
| | Ernst August, Crown Prince of Hanover | 1845–1923 | 16 November 1878 | Kingdom of Hanover | |
| | Count Eduard Ivanovich of Totleben | 1818–1884 | 22 April 1879 | Russian Empire | |
| | Carol I, Prince of Romania | 1839–1914 | 10 May 1879 | Romania | Later Carol I, King of Romania |
| | Prince Konstantin of Hohenlohe-Waldenburg-Schillingsfürst | 1828–1896 | 16 November 1879 | Austria-Hungary | Oberhofmeister of the Austrian King and Emperor |
| | Count Franz Folliot de Crenneville | 1815–1888 | 16 November 1879 | Austria-Hungary | |
| | Prince Wilhelm of Prussia | 1859–1941 | 28 November 1879 | German Empire; Kingdom of Prussia | Later Wilhelm II, German Emperor and King of Prussia |
| | Oscar, Prince Bernadotte, Count of Wisborg | 1859–1953 | 20 July 1880 | United Kingdoms of Sweden and Norway | Born Prince Oscar, Duke of Gotland |
| | Grand Duke Michael Nikolaevich of Russia | 1832–1909 | 10 September 1881 | Russian Empire | |
| | Archduke Albrecht, Duke of Teschen | 1817–1895 | 19 September 1881 | Austria-Hungary | |
| | Milan I, King of Serbia | 1854–1901 | 19 May 1882 | Kingdom of Serbia | |
| | Ernst I, Duke of Saxe-Altenburg | 1826–1908 | 28 October 1882 | Duchy of Saxe-Altenburg | |
| | Baron Arthur Pavlovich von Mohrenheim | 1824–1906 | 26 November 1882 | Russian Empire | |
| | Alexander, Prince of Bulgaria | 1857–1893 | 6 July 1883 | Principality of Bulgaria | |
| | Prince Carl, Duke of Västergötland | 1861–1951 | 31 August 1883 | United Kingdoms of Sweden and Norway | |
| | Prince Eugen, Duke of Närke | 1865–1947 | 31 August 1883 | United Kingdoms of Sweden and Norway | |
| | Carlos, Prince Royal of Portugal | 1863–1908 | 7 October 1883 | Kingdom of Portugal | Later Carlos I, King of Portugal and the Algarves |
| | Prince Albert Victor of Wales | 1864–1892 | 11 October 1883 | United Kingdom | Later Duke of Clarence and Avondale |
| | Nicholas, Tsesarevich of Russia | 1868–1918 | 18 May 1884 | Russian Empire | Later Nicholas II, Emperor of Russia |
| | Prince Alexander Friedrich of Hesse-Kassel | 1863–1945 | 29 October 1884 | Electorate of Hesse | Later Alexander Friedrich, Landgrave of Hesse |
| | Abdul Hamid II, Sultan of the Ottoman Empire | 1842–1918 | 13 December 1884 | Ottoman Empire | |
| | Prince Robert, Duke of Chartres | 1840–1910 | 14 September 1885 | France | |
| | Prince George of Wales | 1865–1936 | 11 October 1885 | United Kingdom | Later George V, King of the United Kingdom |
| | Prince Philippe, Count of Paris | 1838–1894 | 22 October 1885 | France | |
| | Constantine, Crown Prince of Greece | 1868–1923 | 28 August 1886 | Kingdom of Greece | Also Prince of Denmark; Later Constantine I, King of the Hellenes |
| | Mutsuhito, Emperor of Japan | 1852–1912 | 18 May 1887 | Empire of Japan | |
| | Prince Heinrich of Prussia | 1862–1929 | 30 July 1888 | Kingdom of Prussia | |
| | Alexander August Wilhelm von Pape | 1813–1895 | 25 August 1888 | German Empire | |
| | Prince Christian of Denmark | 1870–1947 | 26 September 1888 | Denmark | Later Christian X, King of Denmark, and Sovereign of the Order |
| | Nikolay de Girs | 1820–1895 | 25 October 1888 | Russian Empire | Minister of Foreign Affairs of the Russian Empire (1882–1895) |
| | Prince George of Greece and Denmark | 1869–1957 | 15 November 1888 | Kingdom of Greece | |
| | Nicholas I, Prince of Montenegro | 1841–1921 | 18 May 1889 | Principality of Montenegro | Later Nicholas I, King of Montenegro |
| | Count Gustav Kálnoky von Kőröspatak | 1832–1898 | 18 May 1889 | Austria-Hungary | Ministers of the Imperial and Royal House and of Foreign Affairs of Austria-Hungary (1881–1895) |
| | Karl I, King of Württemberg | 1823–1891 | 21 June 1889 | Kingdom of Württemberg | |
| | Grand Duke George Alexandrovich of Russia | 1871–1899 | 9 October 1889 | Russian Empire | |
| | Archduke Karl Ludwig of Austria | 1833–1896 | 21 July 1890 | Austria-Hungary | |
| | Prince Carl of Denmark | 1872–1957 | 3 August 1890 | Denmark | Later Haakon VII, King of Norway |
| | Archduke Karl Stephen of Austria | 1860–1901 | 18 August 1890 | Austria-Hungary | |
| | Prince Nicholas of Greece and Denmark | 1872–1938 | 7 September 1890 | Kingdom of Greece | |
| | Luitpold, Prince Regent of Bavaria | 1821–1912 | 18 May 1891 | Kingdom of Bavaria | |
| | Sadi Carnot | 1837–1894 | 5 August 1891 | France | President of the French Republic (1887–1894) |
| | Vittorio Emanuele, Prince of Naples | 1869–1947 | 23 September 1891 | Kingdom of Italy | Later Vittorio Emanuele III, King of Italy |
| | Count Illarion Ivanovich Vorontsov-Dashkov | 1837–1916 | 21 December 1891 | Russian Empire | Minister of Imperial Court of the Russian Empire (1881–1897) |
| | Chulalongkorn, King of Siam | 1853–1910 | 8 January 1892 | Siam | |
| | Louise, Queen of Denmark | 1817–1898 | 26 May 1892 | Electorate of Hesse; Denmark | Born Princess of Hesse-Kassel |
| | Archduke Friedrich, Duke of Teschen | 1856–1936 | 26 May 1892 | Austria-Hungary | |
| | Prince Albrecht of Schleswig-Holstein-Sonderburg-Glücksburg | 1863–1948 | 26 May 1892 | Denmark | Christian XI's nephew |
| | da:Carl Løvenskiold | 1822–1898 | 26 May 1892 | Denmark | Court Marshal of Denmark |
| | Johannes Nellemann | 1831–1906 | 12 May 1893 | Denmark | Minister of Justice (1875–1896) |
| | Friedrich Franz III, Grand Duke of Mecklenburg-Schwerin | 1851–1897 | 17 July 1894 | Grand Duchy of Mecklenburg-Schwerin | |
| | Prince Harald of Denmark | 1876–1949 | 28 July 1894 | Denmark | |
| | da:Peter Buch | 1816–1904 | 28 July 1894 | Denmark | |
| | Prince Friedrich Karl of Hesse-Kassel | 1868–1940 | 24 June 1895 | Electorate of Hesse | Later Fredrik Kaarle, King-elect of Finland |
| | Grand Duke Alexander Mikhailovich of Russia | 1866–1933 | 7 September 1895 | Russian Empire | |
| | Georg, Prince of Schaumburg-Lippe | 1846–1911 | 5 May 1896 | Principality of Schaumburg-Lippe | |
| | Vajiravudh, Crown Prince of Siam | 1881–1925 | 27 July 1897 | Siam | Later Vajiravudh, King of Siam |
| | Svasti Sobhana, Prince Svastivatana Visishtha | 1865–1935 | 27 July 1897 | Siam | |
| | Friedrich Franz IV, Grand Duke of Mecklenburg-Schwerin | 1882–1945 | 3 August 1897 | Grand Duchy of Mecklenburg-Schwerin | |
| | Grand Duke Michael Alexandrovich of Russia | 1878–1918 | 6 August 1897 | Russian Empire | |
| | Baron Fredrik von Essen | 1831–1921 | 18 September 1897 | United Kingdoms of Sweden and Norway | The King of Sweden and Norway's Marshal of the Realm (1894–1911) |
| | Friedrich, Hereditary Grand Duke of Baden | 1857–1928 | 13 October 1897 | Grand Duchy of Baden | Later Friedrich II, Grand Duke of Baden |
| | Grand Duke Nicholas Mikhailovich of Russia | 1859–1919 | 18 November 1897 | Russian Empire | |
| | Niels Frederik Ravn | 1826–1910 | 8 April 1898 | Denmark | Minister of Foreign Affairs (1897–1900) |
| | Duke Johann Albrecht of Mecklenburg-Schwerin | 1857–1920 | 9 June 1898 | Grand Duchy of Mecklenburg-Schwerin | |
| | Georg Wilhelm, Hereditary Prince of Hanover | 1880–1912 | 9 October 1898 | Kingdom of Hanover | Christian IX's grandson |
| | Yoshihito, Crown Prince of Japan | 1879–1926 | 9 October 1899 | Empire of Japan | Later Yoshihito, Emperor of Japan |
| | Wilhelm, German Crown Prince and Crown Prince of Prussia | 1882–1951 | 6 May 1900 | German Empire; Kingdom of Prussia | |
| | Prince Maximilian of Baden | 1867–1929 | 10 July 1900 | Grand Duchy of Baden | Later Maximilian, Margrave of Baden; Later Imperial Chancellor of the German Empire (1918) |
| | Grand Duke George Mikhailovich of Russia | 1863–1919 | 7 September 1900 | Russian Empire | |
| | Prince Friedrich of Schaumburg-Lippe | 1868–1945 | 14 September 1900 | Principality of Schaumburg-Lippe | |
| | Émile Loubet | 1838–1929 | 1 November 1900 | France | President of the French Republic (1899–1906) |
| | Alfonso XIII, King of Spain | 1886–1941 | 20 July 1901 | Spain | |
| | Duke Peter Alexandrovich of Oldenburg | 1868–1924 | 12 September 1901 | Russian Empire | |
| | Friedrich, Hereditary Prince of Anhalt | 1856–1918 | 14 July 1902 | Duchy of Anhalt | Later Friedrich II, Duke of Anhalt |
| | Prince Andrew of Greece and Denmark | 1882–1944 | 6 August 1902 | Kingdom of Greece | |
| | Baron Lave Beck-Friis | 1834–1904 | 27 October 1902 | United Kingdoms of Sweden and Norway | Envoy of the United Kingdoms of Sweden and Norway to the Kingdom of Denmark (1870–1902) |
| | Count August zu Eulenburg | 1838–1921 | 3 April 1903 | German Empire | |
| | Prince Friedrich Heinrich of Prussia | 1874–1940 | 29 August 1903 | Kingdom of Prussia | |
| | Gojong, Emperor of Korea | 1852–1919 | 31 August 1903 | Empire of Korea | |
| | Prince Gustaf Adolf, Duke of Skåne | 1882–1973 | 28 October 1903 | United Kingdoms of Sweden and Norway | Later Gustaf VI Adolf, King of Sweden |
| | Duke Paul Friedrich of Mecklenburg-Schwerin | 1852–1923 | 3 August 1904 | Grand Duchy of Mecklenburg-Schwerin | |
| | Prince Heinrich XVIII Reuss of Köstritz | 1847–1911 | 3 August 1904 | Principality of Reuss-Gera | |
| | Adolf Friedrich V, Grand Duke of Mecklenburg-Strelitz | 1848–1914 | 19 August 1904 | Grand Duchy of Mecklenburg-Strelitz | |
| | Prince Gustav of Denmark | 1887–1944 | 4 March 1905 | Denmark | |
| | Prince Friedrich Wilhelm of Prussia | 1880–1925 | 8 April 1905 | Kingdom of Prussia | |
| | Prince Aage of Denmark | 1887–1940 | 10 June 1905 | Denmark | Later Prince Aage, Count of Rosenborg |
| | Hans von Koester | 1844–1928 | 21 July 1905 | German Empire | |
| | Prince Ernst August of Hanover | 1887–1953 | 17 November 1905 | Kingdom of Hanover | Later Ernst August, Duke of Brunswick |

=== Frederik VIII (1906–1912) ===
| Image | Name | Life | Date | Country | Notes |
|---|---|---|---|---|---|
| | Charles Edward, Duke of Saxe-Coburg and Gotha | 1884–1954 | 16 June 1906 | Duchy of Saxe-Coburg and Gotha | |
| | Prince Axel of Denmark | 1888–1964 | 12 August 1906 | Denmark | |
| | Conrad Victor Ankarcrona | 1823–1912 | 11 September 1906 | Sweden | Grand Master of the Court of the King of Sweden |
| | Louise, Queen of Denmark | 1851–1926 | 31 October 1906 | Sweden; Denmark | Born Princess of Sweden |
| | Prince Eitel Friedrich of Prussia | 1883–1942 | 19 November 1906 | German Empire | |
| | Bernhard, Prince of Bülow | 1849–1929 | 19 November 1906 | German Empire | Imperial Chancellor of the German Empire and Minister-President of Prussia (1900–1909) |
| | Prince Ferdinand of Bavaria | 1884–1958 | 25 April 1907 | Kingdom of Bavaria | |
| | Armand Fallières | 1841–1931 | 14 June 1907 | France | President of the French Republic (1906–1913) |
| | Prince Adalbert of Prussia | 1884–1948 | 3 July 1907 | German Empire | |
| | Prince Wilhelm, Duke of Södermanland | 1884–1965 | 18 December 1907 | Sweden | |
| | Ferdinand, Crown Prince of Romania | 1865–1927 | 8 January 1908 | Kingdom of Romania | Later Ferdinand I, King of the Romanians |
| | Franz Ferdinand, Archduke of Austria-Este | 1863–1914 | 12 May 1908 | Austria-Hungary | |
| | Christian Danneskiold-Samsøe | 1838–1914 | 3 June 1908 | Denmark | Chancellor of the Chapter of the Royal Danish Orders of Chivalry (1911–1914) |
| | Prince Erik of Denmark | 1890–1950 | 8 November 1908 | Denmark | Later Count of Rosenborg |
| | Manuel II, King of Portugal and the Algarves | 1889–1932 | 24 March 1909 | Kingdom of Portugal | |
| | Frederick Augustus II, Grand Duke of Oldenburg | 1852–1931 | 28 April 1909 | Grand Duchy of Oldenburg | Abdicated 1918 |
| | Count Vladimir Borisovich Frederiks | 1838–1927 | 16 July 1909 | Russian Empire | Minister of the Imperial Court of the Emperor of All Russia (1897–1917) |
| | Grand Duke Nicholas Nikolaevich of Russia | 1856–1929 | 19 July 1909 | Russian Empire | |
| | Prince Christopher of Greece and Denmark | 1888–1940 | 29 July 1909 | Kingdom of Greece | |
| | Prince George of Greece and Denmark | 1890–1947 | 15 August 1909 | Kingdom of Greece | Later George II, King of the Hellenes |
| | Albert I, King of the Belgians | 1875–1934 | 23 February 1910 | Belgium | |
| | Ferdinand I, Tsar of the Bulgarians | 1861–1948 | 20 May 1910 | Tsardom of Bulgaria | Abdicated 1918 |
| | Arvid Taube | 1853–1916 | 6 March 1911 | Sweden | Foreign Minister of Sweden (1909–1911) |
| | Johannes Zeuthen Schroll | 1831–1916 | 27 March 1911 | Denmark | |
| | Chakrabongse Bhuvanath, Prince of Bishnulok | 1883–1920 | 7 August 1911 | Siam | |
| | Prince Viggo of Denmark | 1893–1970 | 25 December 1911 | Denmark | Later Count of Rosenborg |
| | Vilhelm Thomsen | 1842–1927 | 25 January 1912 | Denmark | |

=== Christian X (1912–1947) ===
| Image | Name | Life | Date | Country | Notes |
|---|---|---|---|---|---|
| | Frederik, Crown Prince of Denmark | 1899–1972 | 14 May 1912 | Denmark | Later Frederik IX, King of Denmark, and Sovereign of the Order |
| | Prince Knud of Denmark | 1900–1976 | 14 May 1912 | Denmark | Later Knud, Hereditary Prince of Denmark |
| | Prince August Wilhelm of Prussia | 1887–1949 | 15 June 1912 | German Empire | |
| | Alexandrine, Queen of Denmark | 1879–1952 | 26 September 1912 | Grand Duchy of Mecklenburg-Schwerin | Born Duchess of Mecklenburg-Schwerin; Received insignia only |
| | Alexandrine, Queen of Denmark | 1879–1952 | 26 September 1912 | Denmark | Born Duchess of Mecklenburg-Schwerin; Received insignia only |
| | Prince Erik, Duke of Västmanland | 1889–1918 | 20 November 1912 | Denmark | |
| | Prince Hendrik of the Netherlands | 1876–1934 | 12 December 1912 | Grand Duchy of Mecklenburg-Schwerin; The Netherlands | Born Duke of Mecklenburg-Schwerin |
| | Prince Oskar of Prussia | 1888–1958 | 25 February 1913 | German Empire | |
| | Theobald von Bethmann Hollweg | 1856–1921 | 25 February 1913 | German Empire | Imperial Chancellor of the German Empire (1909–1917) |
| | Edward, Prince of Wales | 1894–1972 | 17 March 1914 | United Kingdom | Later Edward VIII, King of the United Kingdom; Abdicated 1936 |
| | Prince Arthur of Connaught | 1883–1938 | 10 May 1914 | United Kingdom | |
| | Raymond Poincaré | 1860–1934 | 16 May 1914 | France | President of the French Republic (1913–1920) |
| | Hans Niels Andersen | 1852–1937 | 12 February 1919 | Denmark | |
| | Baron Carl Gustaf Mannerheim | 1867–1951 | 18 February 1919 | Kingdom of Finland | Regent of the Kingdom of Finland (1918–1919); Later President of the Republic of Finland (1944–1946) |
| | Leopold, Duke of Brabant | 1901–1983 | 27 October 1919 | Belgium | Later Leopold III, King of the Belgians; Abdicated 1951 |
| | Prince Albert, Duke of York | 1895–1952 | 30 November 1920 | United Kingdom | Later George VI, King of the United Kingdom |
| | Alexandre Millerand | 1859–1943 | 8 December 1920 | France | President of the French Republic (1920–1924) |
| | Prince René of Bourbon-Parma | 1894–1962 | 9 June 1921 | Duchy of Parma and Piacenza | |
| | Olav, Crown Prince of Norway | 1903–1991 | 13 August 1921 | Norway | Born Prince Alexander of Denmark; Later Olav V, King of Norway |
| | Epitácio Pessoa | 1865–1942 | 14 November 1921 | Brazil | President of the Federative Republic of Brazil (1919–1922) |
| | Umberto, Prince of Piedmont | 1904–1983 | 31 August 1922 | Kingdom of Italy | Later Umberto II, King of Italy; Abdicated 1946 |
| | Wilhelmina, Queen of Netherlands | 1880–1962 | 5 September 1922 | The Netherlands | Awarded insignia only Abdicated 1948 |
| | Prince George, Duke of Kent | 1902–1942 | 23 September 1922 | United Kingdom | |
| | Hirohito, Crown Prince of Japan | 1901–1989 | 23 January 1923 | Japan | Later Hirohito, Emperor of Japan |
| | Baron Tage Reedtz-Thott | 1839–1923 | 30 October 1923 | Denmark | Council President of Denmark (1894–1897) |
| | Stanisław Wojciechowski | 1869–1953 | 20 December 1923 | Republic of Poland | President of the Republic of Poland (1922–1926) |
| | Prince Henry, Duke of Gloucester | 1900–1974 | 24 June 1924 | United Kingdom | |
| | Duke Adolf Friedrich of Mecklenburg-Schwerin | 1873–1969 | 23 August 1924 | Grand Duchy of Mecklenburg-Schwerin | |
| | Tomáš Masaryk | 1850–1937 | 24 February 1925 | Czechoslovakia | President of Czechoslovakia (1918–1935) |
| | Prajadhipok, King of Siam | 1893–1941 | 8 February 1926 | Siam | Abdicated 1932 |
| | Lauri Kristian Relander | 1883–1942 | 7 October 1926 | Finland | President of the Republic of Finland (1925–1931) |
| | Prince Charles, Count of Flanders | 1903–1983 | 9 November 1926 | Belgium | |
| | Gaston Doumergue | 1863–1937 | 12 March 1927 | France | President of the French Republic (1924–1931) |
| | Prince Paul of Greece and Denmark | 1901–1964 | 7 August 1927 | Kingdom of Greece | Later Paul, King of the Hellenes |
| | Grand Duke Kirill Vladimirovich of Russia | 1876–1938 | 18 October 1928 | Russian Empire | |
| | Alfonso, Prince of Asturias | 1907–1938 | 6 February 1929 | Kingdom of Spain | Later Count of Covadonga |
| | Infante Jaime, Duke of Segovia | 1908–1975 | 6 February 1929 | Kingdom of Spain | |
| | Louis II, Prince of Monaco | 1870–1949 | 23 March 1929 | Monaco | |
| | Friedrich Franz, Hereditary Grand Duke of Mecklenburg-Schwerin | 1910–2001 | 7 June 1929 | Grand Duchy of Mecklenburg-Schwerin | |
| | Alexander I, King of Yugoslaiva | 1888–1934 | 26 March 1930 | Kingdom of Yugoslavia | |
| | Berthold, Margrave of Baden | 1906–1963 | 26 April 1930 | Grand Duchy of Baden | |
| | Paribatra Sukhumbandhu, Prince of Nakhon Sawan | 1881–1944 | 4 June 1930 | Siam | |
| | Purachatra Jayakara, Prince of Kamphaengphet | 1881–1936 | 4 June 1930 | Siam | |
| | Tisavarakumarn, Prince Damrong Rajanubhab | 1862–1943 | 13 July 1930 | Siam | |
| | Nobuhito, Prince Takamatsu | 1905–1987 | 3 September 1930 | Japan | |
| | Prince Jean, Duke of Guise | 1874–1940 | 6 October 1930 | France | |
| | Paul Doumer | 1857–1932 | 25 January 1932 | France | President of the French Republic (1931–1932) |
| | Prince Christian of Schaumburg-Lippe | 1898–1974 | 17 March 1932 | Principality of Schaumburg-Lippe | |
| | Fuad I, King of Egypt and the Sudan | 1868–1936 | 4 November 1932 | Kingdom of Egypt | |
| | Albert Lebrun | 1871–1950 | 17 February 1933 | France | President of the French Republic (1932–1940) |
| | Prince Gustaf Adolf, Duke of Västerbotten | 1906–1947 | 16 June 1933 | Sweden | |
| | Prince Carl, Duke of Östergötland | 1911–2003 | 5 December 1933 | Sweden | Later Carl, Prince Bernadotte |
| | Prince Paul of Yugoslavia | 1893–1976 | 7 November 1934 | Kingdom of Yugoslavia | Regent of Yugoslavia (1934–1941) |
| | Prince Peter of Greece and Denmark | 1908–1980 | 26 November 1934 | Kingdom of Greece | |
| | Prince Carl Johan, Duke of Dalarna | 1916–2012 | 21 May 1935 | Sweden | Later Carl Johan, Prince Bernadotte, Count of Wisborg |
| | Prince Bertil, Duke of Halland | 1912–1997 | 21 May 1935 | Sweden | |
| | Reza Shah, Shah of Iran | 1878–1944 | 20 January 1937 | Imperial State of Iran | Abdicated 1941 |
| | Friedrich, Duke of Schleswig-Holstein | 1891–1965 | 24 January 1937 | Schleswig-Holstein | |
| | Prince Gorm of Denmark | 1919–1991 | 24 February 1937 | Denmark | |
| | Prince Georg of Denmark | 1920–1986 | 16 April 1938 | Denmark | |
| | Ernst Augustus, Hereditary Prince of Brunswick | 1914–1987 | 19 January 1939 | Duchy of Brunswick | |
| | Miklós Horthy | 1868–1957 | 16 February 1940 | Kingdom of Hungary | Regent of Hungary (1920–1944) |
| | Prince Flemming of Denmark | 1922–2002 | 9 March 1940 | Denmark | Later Count of Rosenborg |
| | Prince Oluf of Denmark | 1923–1990 | 10 March 1941 | Denmark | Later Count of Rosenborg |
| | Sir Bernard Montgomery | 1887–1976 | 5 July 1945 | United Kingdom | Later Bernard Montgomery, 1st Viscount Montgomery of Alamein |
| | Dwight D. Eisenhower | 1890–1969 | 15 December 1945 | United States | Later President of the United States (1953–1961) |
| | Princess Juliana of the Netherlands | 1909–2004 | 5 April 1946 | The Netherlands | Awarded insignia only Later Juliana, Queen of the Netherlands |
| | Prince Bernhard of the Netherlands | 1911–2004 | 5 April 1946 | The Netherlands | Later Prince consort of the Netherlands |

=== Frederik IX (1947–1972) ===
| Image | Name | Life | Date | Country | Notes |
|---|---|---|---|---|---|
| | **Princess Margrethe of Denmark** | Born 1940 | 20 April 1947 | Denmark | Later Margrethe II, Queen of Denmark, and Sovereign of the Order; Abdicated 2024 |
| | **Princess Benedikte of Denmark** | Born 1944 | 20 April 1947 | Denmark | Later Princess of Sayn-Wittgenstein-Berleburg |
| | **Princess Anne-Marie of Denmark** | Born 1946 | 20 April 1947 | Denmark | Later Queen of the Hellenes |
| | **Princess Anne-Marie of Denmark** | Born 1946 | 20 April 1947 | Denmark; Kingdom of Greece | Later Queen of the Hellenes |
| | Ingrid, Queen of Denmark | 1910–2000 | 24 May 1947 | Sweden | Born Princess of Sweden; Awarded insignia only |
| | Ingrid, Queen of Denmark | 1910–2000 | 24 May 1947 | Denmark | Born Princess of Sweden; Awarded insignia only |
| | Niels Bohr | 1885–1962 | 17 October 1947 | Denmark | |
| | Princess Elizabeth of the United Kingdom | 1926–2022 | 16 November 1947 | United Kingdom | Later Elizabeth II, Queen of the United Kingdom |
| | Philip Mountbatten | 1921–2021 | 16 November 1947 | Kingdom of Greece | Born Prince of Greece and Denmark, later Prince of the United Kingdom, Duke of Edinburgh |
| | Philip Mountbatten | 1921–2021 | 16 November 1947 | United Kingdom | Born Prince of Greece and Denmark, later Prince of the United Kingdom, Duke of Edinburgh |
| | Winston Churchill | 1874–1965 | 9 October 1950 | United Kingdom | Prime Minister of the United Kingdom (1940–1945; 1951–1955) |
| | Juho Kusti Paasikivi | 1870–1956 | 17 November 1950 | Finland | President of the Republic of Finland (1946–1956) |
| | Vincent Auriol | 1884–1966 | 28 November 1950 | France | President of the French Republic (1947–1954) |
| | Sigvard, Prince Bernadotte, Count of Wisborg | 1907–2002 | 28 March 1952 | Sweden | Formerly Prince of Sweden, Duke of Uppland |
| | Chumbhotbongs Paribatra, Prince of Nakhon Sawan II | 1904–1959 | 28 November 1952 | Thailand | |
| | **Akihito, Crown Prince of Japan** | Born 1933 | 8 August 1953 | Japan | Later Akihito, Emperor of Japan; Abdicated 2019 |
| | Ásgeir Ásgeirsson | 1894–1972 | 5 April 1954 | Iceland | President of Iceland (1952–1968) |
| | Haile Selassie, Emperor of Ethiopia | 1892–1975 | 21 November 1954 | Ethiopian Empire | Abdicated 1974 |
| | Prince Makonnen Haile Selassie, Duke of Harar | 1924–1957 | 21 November 1954 | Ethiopian Empire | |
| | Charlotte, Grand Duchess of Luxembourg | 1896–1985 | 21 March 1955 | Luxembourg | Abdicated 1964 |
| | René Coty | 1882–1962 | 15 May 1955 | France | President of the French Republic (1954–1959) |
| | Takahito, Prince Mikasa | 1915–2016 | 5 March 1957 | Japan | |
| | Urho Kekkonen | 1900–1986 | 3 September 1957 | Finland | President of the Republic of Finland (1956–1982) |
| | Harald, Crown Prince of Norway | 1938–2026 | 21 February 1958 | Norway | Later Harald V, King of Norway |
| | Bhumibol Adulyadej, King of Thailand | 1927–2018 | 21 April 1958 | Thailand | |
| | Mohammad Reza, Shah of Iran | 1919–1980 | 14 May 1959 | Imperial State of Iran | |
| | Caroline-Mathilde, Hereditary Princess of Denmark | 1912–1995 | 3 September 1960 | Denmark | |
| | Princess Axel of Denmark | 1899–1977 | 4 September 1960 | Sweden; Denmark | Born Princess of Sweden |
| | Sirikit, Queen of Thailand | 1932–2025 | 6 September 1960 | Thailand | |
| | **Prince Ingolf of Denmark** | Born 1940 | 17 February 1961 | Denmark | Later Count of Rosenborg |
| | Princess Viggo, Countess of Rosenborg | 1895–1966 | 11 March 1961 | United States; Denmark | |
| | Constantine, Crown Prince of Greece | 1940–2023 | 4 January 1962 | Kingdom of Greece | Later Constantine II, King of the Hellenes |
| | Princess Elisabeth of Denmark | 1935–2018 | 11 March 1962 | Denmark | |
| | Adolf Schärf | 1890–1965 | 6 June 1962 | Austria | Federal President of the Republic of Austria (1957–1965) |
| | Frederica, Queen of the Hellenes | 1917–1981 | 23 January 1963 | Duchy of Brunswick; Kingdom of Greece | Born Princess of Hanover |
| | **Farah, Queen of Iran** | Born 1938 | 3 May 1963 | Imperial State of Iran | Later Empress of Iran |
| | Habib Bourguiba | 1903–2000 | 4 June 1963 | Tunisia | President of the Republic of Tunisia (1957–1987) |
| | Julius Nyerere | 1922–1999 | 9 September 1963 | Republic of Tanganyika | President of the Republic of Tanganyika (1962–1964) |
| | Prince Christian of Denmark | 1942–2013 | 20 October 1963 | Denmark | Later Count of Rosenborg |
| | Antonio Segni | 1891–1972 | 20 April 1964 | Italy | President of the Italian Republic (1962–1964) |
| | Princess Irene of Greece and Denmark | 1942–2026 | 11 September 1964 | Kingdom of Greece | |
| | Prince Michael of Greece and Denmark | 1939–2024 | 11 September 1964 | Kingdom of Greece | |
| | **Carl Gustaf, Crown Prince of Sweden** | Born 1946 | 12 January 1965 | Sweden | Later Carl XVI Gustaf, King of Sweden |
| | Charles de Gaulle | 1890–1970 | 5 April 1965 | France | President of the French Republic (1959–1969) |
| | **Masahito, Prince Hitachi** | Born 1935 | 28 September 1965 | Japan | |
| | Baudouin, King of the Belgians | 1930–1993 | 8 February 1966 | Belgium | |
| | Giuseppe Saragat | 1898–1988 | 16 May 1966 | Italy | President of the Italian Republic (1964–1971) |
| | Prince Henrik of Denmark | 1934–2018 | 10 June 1967 | France; Denmark | Born Henri de Laborde de Monpezat |
| | Richard, Hereditary Prince of Sayn-Wittgenstein-Berleburg | 1934–2017 | 3 February 1968 | Denmark | Later Richard, 6th Prince of Sayn-Wittgenstein-Berleburg |
| | **Albert, Prince of Liège** | Born 1934 | 18 June 1968 | Belgium | Later Albert II, King of the Belgians; Abdicated 2013 |
| | Asfa Wossen Haile Selassie, Crown Prince of Ethiopia | 1914–1997 | 15 January 1970 | Ethiopian Empire | |
| | Gustav Heinemann | 1899–1976 | 9 June 1970 | Federal Republic of Germany | Federal President of the Federal Republic of Germany (1969–1974) |
| | Kristján Eldjárn | 1916–1982 | 2 September 1970 | Iceland | President of Iceland (1968–1980) |

=== Margrethe II (1972–2024) ===
| Image | Name | Life | Date | Country | Notes |
|---|---|---|---|---|---|
| | **Frederik, Crown Prince of Denmark** | Born 1968 | 14 January 1972 | Denmark | Later Frederik X, King of Denmark, and Sovereign of the Order |
| | **Prince Joachim of Denmark** | Born 1969 | 14 January 1972 | Denmark | Chancellor of the Chapter of the Royal Orders of Chivalry |
| | **Princess Christina of Sweden** | Born 1943 | 16 January 1973 | Sweden | Later Princess Christina, Mrs Magnuson |
| | **Sonja, Crown Princess of Norway** | Born 1937 | 12 February 1973 | Norway | Later Queen of Norway |
| | Princess Georg of Denmark | 1917–1980 | 16 April 1974 | Denmark | Born Anne Bowes-Lyon, formerly Viscountess Anson |
| | Princess Georg of Denmark | 1917–1980 | 16 April 1974 | United Kingdom | Born Anne Bowes-Lyon, formerly Viscountess Anson |
| | **Charles, Prince of Wales** | Born 1947 | 30 April 1974 | United Kingdom | Later Charles III, King of the United Kingdom |
| | Josip Broz Tito | 1892–1980 | 29 October 1974 | Socialist Federal Republic of Yugoslavia | President of the Socialist Federal Republic of Yugoslavia (1953–1980) |
| | **Princess Beatrix of the Netherlands** | Born 1938 | 29 October 1975 | The Netherlands | Later Queen of the Netherlands; Abdicated 2013 |
| | Prince Claus of the Netherlands | 1926–2002 | 29 October 1975 | The Netherlands | Later Prince consort of the Netherlands |
| | Jean, Grand Duke of Luxembourg | 1921–2019 | 22 November 1976 | Luxembourg | Abdicated 2000 |
| | Joséphine-Charlotte, Grand Duchess of Luxembourg | 1927–2005 | 22 November 1976 | Belgium; Luxembourg | Born Princess of Belgium |
| | Valéry Giscard d'Estaing | 1926–2020 | 12 October 1978 | France | President of the French Republic (1974–1980) |
| | Giovanni Leone | 1908–2001 | 8 November 1978 | Italy | President of the Italian Republic (1971–1978) |
| | Rudolf Kirchschläger | 1915–2000 | 3 April 1979 | Austria | Federal President of the Republic of Austria (1974–1986) |
| | **Juan Carlos I, King of Spain** | Born 1938 | 17 March 1980 | Spain | Abdicated 2014 |
| | **Sofía, Queen of Spain** | Born 1938 | 17 March 1980 | Kingdom of Greece; Spain | Born Princess of Greece and Denmark |
| | **Vigdís Finnbogadóttir** | Born 1930 | 25 February 1981 | Iceland | President of Iceland (1980–1996) |
| | Nagako, Empress of Japan | 1903–2000 | 21 April 1981 | Japan | |
| | François Mitterrand | 1916–1996 | 28 April 1982 | France | President of the French Republic (1981–1995) |
| | Mauno Koivisto | 1923–2017 | 20 April 1983 | Finland | President of the Republic of Finland (1982–1994) |
| | Fahd, King of Saudi Arabia | 1920, 1921 or 1923–2005 | 18 March 1984 | Saudi Arabia | |
| | **António Ramalho Eanes** | Born 1935 | 25 June 1984 | Portugal | President of the Portuguese Republic (1976–1986) |
| | **Silvia, Queen of Sweden** | Born 1943 | 3 September 1985 | Sweden | |
| | Hosni Mubarak | 1928–2020 | 19 February 1986 | Egypt | President of the Arab Republic of Egypt (1981–2011) |
| | Hassan II, King of Morocco | 1929–1999 | 15 February 1988 | Morocco | |
| | Richard Freiherr von Weizsäcker | 1920–2015 | 25 April 1989 | Federal Republic of Germany | Federal President of the Federal Republic of Germany (1984–1994) |
| | Birendra, King of Nepal | 1945–2001 | 17 October 1989 | Kingdom of Nepal | |
| | **Haakon, Crown Prince of Norway** | Born 1973 | 20 July 1991 | Norway | Later Haakon VIII, King of Norway |
| | Mário Soares | 1924–2017 | 6 May 1992 | Portugal | President of the Portuguese Republic (1986–1996) |
| | **Princess Märtha Louise of Norway** | Born 1971 | 13 October 1992 | Norway | |
| | **Lech Wałęsa** | Born 1943 | 5 July 1993 | Poland | President of the Republic of Poland (1990–1995) |
| | Oscar Luigi Scalfaro | 1918–2012 | 19 October 1993 | Italy | President of the Italian Republic (1992–1999) |
| | Lennart Meri | 1929–2006 | 12 April 1994 | Estonia | President of the Republic of Estonia (1992–2001) |
| | Martti Ahtisaari | 1937–2023 | 7 September 1994 | Finland | President of the Republic of Finland (1994–2000) |
| | **Paola, Queen of the Belgians** | Born 1937 | 16 May 1995 | Belgium | |
| | **Victoria, Crown Princess of Sweden** | Born 1977 | 14 July 1995 | Sweden | |
| | **Alexandra Manley** | Born 1964 | 17 November 1995 | Hong Kong; Denmark | Later Princess of Denmark, then Countess of Frederiksborg |
| | Nelson Mandela | 1918–2013 | 18 February 1996 | South Africa | President of the Republic of South Africa (1994–1999) |
| | Algirdas Brazauskas | 1932–2010 | 9 October 1996 | Lithuania | President of the Republic of Lithuania (1992–1998) |
| | **Ólafur Ragnar Grímsson** | Born 1943 | 18 November 1996 | Iceland | President of Iceland (1996–2016) |
| | **Pavlos, Crown Prince of Greece** | Born 1967 | 14 January 1997 | Kingdom of Greece; Denmark | Also Prince of Denmark |
| | **Guntis Ulmanis** | Born 1939 | 18 March 1997 | Latvia | President of the Republic of Latvia (1993–1999) |
| | **Willem-Alexander, Prince of Orange** | Born 1967 | 31 January 1998 | The Netherlands | Later Willem-Alexander, King of the Netherlands |
| | Al Hussein I bin Talal, King of the Hashemite Kingdom of Jordan | 1935–1999 | 27 April 1998 | Jordan | |
| | **Noor Al Hussein, Queen of the Hashemite Kingdom of Jordan** | Born 1951 | 27 April 1998 | Jordan | |
| | **Michiko, Empress of Japan** | Born 1934 | 2 June 1998 | Japan | |
| | **Fernando Henrique Cardoso** | Born 1931 | 3 May 1999 | Brazil | President of the Federative Republic of Brazil (1995–2002) |
| | **Emil Constantinescu** | Born 1939 | 23 May 2000 | Romania | President of Romania (1996–2000) |
| | **Petar Stoyanov** | Born 1952 | 17 October 2000 | Bulgaria | President of the Republic of Bulgaria (1997–2002) |
| | Mærsk Mc-Kinney Møller | 1913–2012 | 15 December 2000 | Denmark | |
| | **Vajiralongkorn, Crown Prince of Thailand** | Born 1952 | 7 February 2001 | Thailand | Later Maha Vajiralongkorn, King of Thailand |
| | **Tarja Halonen** | Born 1943 | 3 April 2001 | Finland | President of the Republic of Finland (2000–2012) |
| | **Milan Kučan** | Born 1941 | 10 October 2001 | Slovenia | President of the Republic of Slovenia (1991–2002) |
| | Johannes Rau | 1931–2006 | 24 April 2002 | Germany | Federal President of the Federal Republic of Germany (1999–2004) |
| | **Prince Philippe, Duke of Brabant** | Born 1960 | 28 May 2002 | Belgium | Later Philippe, King of the Belgians |
| | **Henri, Grand Duke of Luxembourg** | Born 1955 | 20 October 2003 | Luxembourg | Abdicated 2025 |
| | **Maria Teresa, Grand Duchess of Luxembourg** | Born 1956 | 20 October 2003 | Luxembourg | |
| | Ion Iliescu | 1930–2025 | 16 March 2004 | Romania | President of Romania (1989–1996) |
| | **Mary Donaldson** | Born 1972 | 9 May 2004 | Australia; Denmark | Later Crown Princess, then Queen of Denmark |
| | **Naruhito, Crown Prince of Japan** | Born 1960 | 16 November 2004 | Japan | Later Naruhito, Emperor of Japan |
| | **Georgi Parvanov** | Born 1957 | 29 March 2006 | Bulgaria | President of the Republic of Bulgaria (2002–2012) |
| | Karolos Papoulias | 1929–2021 | 24 May 2006 | Greece | President of the Hellenic Republic (2005–2015) |
| | **Luiz Inácio Lula da Silva** | Born 1945 | 12 September 2007 | Brazil | President of the Federative Republic of Brazil (2003–2010; 2023–present) |
| | Roh Moo-hyun | 1946–2009 | 8 October 2007 | South Korea | President of the Republic of Korea (2003–2008) |
| | **Felipe Calderón Hinojosa** | Born 1962 | 18 February 2008 | Mexico | President of the United Mexican States (2006–2012) |
| | **Princess Marie of Denmark** | Born 1976 | 24 May 2008 | France; Denmark | Born Marie Cavallier |
| | **Lee Myung-bak** | Born 1941 | 11 May 2011 | South Korea | President of the Republic of Korea (2008–2013) |
| | **Ivan Gašparovič** | Born 1941 | 23 October 2012 | Slovakia | President of the Republic of Slovakia (2004–2018) |
| | **Sauli Niinistö** | Born 1948 | 4 April 2013 | Finland | President of the Republic of Finland (2012–2024) |
| | **Mette-Marit, Crown Princess of Norway** | Born 1973 | 17 May 2014 | Norway | Later Queen of Norway |
| | **Máxima, Queen of the Netherlands** | Born 1971 | 17 March 2015 | The Netherlands | |
| | **Enrique Peña Nieto** | Born 1966 | 13 April 2016 | Mexico | President of the United Mexican States (2012–2018) |
| | **Guðni Th. Jóhannesson** | Born 1968 | 24 January 2017 | Iceland | President of Iceland (2016–2024) |
| | **Mathilde, Queen of the Belgians** | Born 1973 | 28 March 2017 | Belgium | |
| | **Emmanuel Macron** | Born 1977 | 28 August 2018 | France | President of the French Republic (2017–present) |
| | **Frank-Walter Steinmeier** | Born 1956 | 10 November 2021 | Germany | Federal President of the Federal Republic of Germany (2017–present) |
| | **Princess Ingrid Alexandra of Norway** | Born 2004 | 21 January 2022 | Norway | |
| | **Prince Christian of Denmark** | Born 2005 | 15 October 2023 | Denmark | Later Crown Prince of Denmark |
| | **Felipe VI, King of Spain** | Born 1968 | 6 November 2023 | Spain | |
| | **Letizia, Queen of Spain** | Born 1972 | 6 November 2023 | Spain | |

=== Frederik X (2024–present) ===
| Image | Name | Life | Date | Country | Notes |
|---|---|---|---|---|---|
| | Princess Isabella of Denmark | Born 2007 | 14 January 2024 | Denmark | |
| | Prince Vincent of Denmark | Born 2011 | 14 January 2024 | Denmark | |
| | Princess Josephine of Denmark | Born 2011 | 14 January 2024 | Denmark | |
| | Prince Daniel, Duke of Västergötland | Born 1973 | 6 May 2024 | Sweden | |
| | Halla Tómasdóttir | Born 1968 | 8 October 2024 | Iceland | President of Iceland (2024–present) |
| | Abdel Fattah el-Sisi | Born 1954 | 6 December 2024 | Egypt | President of the Arab Republic of Egypt (2014–present) |
| | Alexander Stubb | Born 1968 | 4 March 2025 | Finland | President of the Republic of Finland (2024–present) |
| | Edgars Rinkēvičs | Born 1973 | 28 October 2025 | Latvia | President of the Republic of Latvia (2023–present) |
| | Alar Karis | Born 1958 | 27 January 2026 | Estonia | President of the Republic of Estonia (2021–present) |
| | Gitanas Nausėda | Born 1964 | 28 January 2026 | Lithuania | President of the Republic of Lithuania (2019–present) |

== Bibliography ==
- Pedersen, Jørgen (2009). Riddere af Elefantordenen, 1559–2009 (in Danish). Odense: Syddansk Universitetsforlag. ISBN 978-87-7674-434-2.
