= Doumergue Agreement =

Secret agreement of WW1

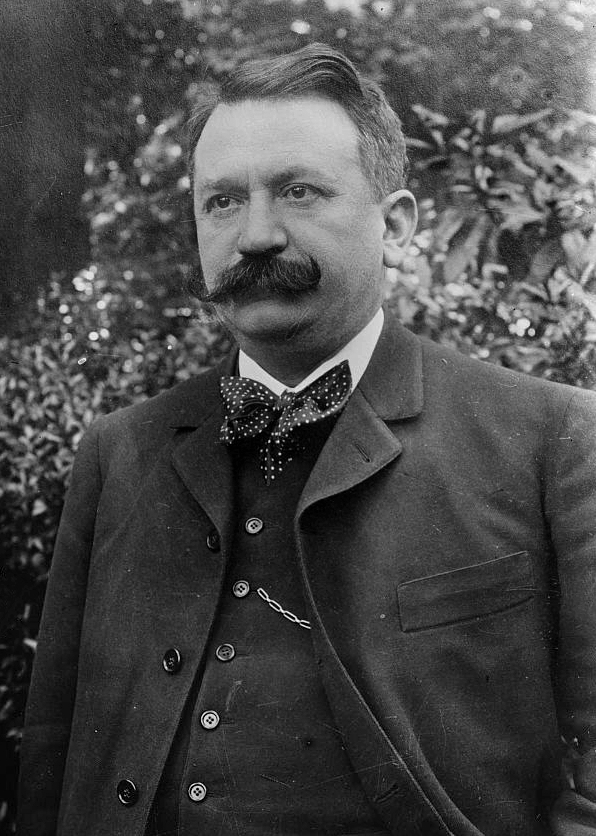
Gaston Doumergue, c. 1910–1915

The Doumergue Agreement was a secret 1917 agreement between France and Russia concerning their war aims in World War I. Gaston Doumergue, the French Minister for Colonies, visited Petrograd and negotiated the agreement on 3 February 1917 with Tsar Nicholas II and the Russian officials. According to the agreement, France would regain Alsace-Lorraine in its boundaries of 1790 and 'the entire coal district of the Saar valley'. It further stipulated that France would secure the Left Bank of the Rhine by organizing into neutral buffer states those parts of the region that would not be annexed by France outright. In exchange, France promised Russia to support Russian annexations in Poland at the expense of the Central Powers.

The terms of the agreement were set in writing in a letter exchange between Maurice Paleologue, the French Ambassador to Russia, and Nikolai Pokrovsky, the Russian foreign minister, on 14 February 1917. The agreement was approved by the French prime minister, Aristide Briand, but not disclosed to other members of his cabinet. It is unlikely that a majority of ministers would have approved the pact as it was too expansionist.
