= Medferiashwork Abebe =

Empress consort of Ethiopia (1922–2009)

Medferiashwork Abebe መድፈሪያሽወርቅ አበበ

Queen consort of Ethiopia (designated, unacknowledged)
- Tenure: 12 September 1974 – 21 March 1975

Empress consort of Ethiopia (in exile)
- Tenure: 8 April 1989 – 17 January 1997
- Born: Amete Maryam; 1922
- Died: 13 March 2009 (aged 86–87); Addis Ababa, Ethiopia
- Burial: Holy Trinity Cathedral, Addis Ababa
- Spouse: Amha Selassie (m. 1945; died 1997)
- Issue: Princess Maryam Senna; Princess Sehin Azebe; Crown Prince Zera Yacob; Princess Sifrash Bizu
- House: House of Solomon (by marriage)
- Father: Dejazmatch and Mayor-General Abebe Damtew
- Mother: Woizero Wosenyelesh Mangasha
- Religion: Ethiopian Orthodox Tewahedo

Medferiashwork Abebe (Amharic: መድፈሪያሽወርቅ አበበ; 1922 – 13 March 2009), baptismal name Amete Maryam, was the titular empress consort of Amha Selassie, emperor-in-exile of Ethiopia. Her full title used by monarchists was "Her Imperial Majesty, Empress Medferiashwork", but she was officially regarded in post-Derg Ethiopia as "Her Imperial Highness Princess Medferiashwork Abebe".

== Biography ==
Her father was Dejazmach and Major-General Abebe Damtew, so she was a niece of Ras Desta Damtew who was the first husband of her sister-in-law, Princess Tenagnework. She was thus a member of the aristocratic Adisge clan. Her mother was Woizero Wosenyelesh Mangasha, who in turn was daughter of Ras Bitwodad Mangasha Atikam of Damot and Agawmeder, Viceroy of Gojjam, who was a major figure during the reign of Emperor Menelik II, by his second wife Sifrash Bizu Yifru. Medferiashwork was thus a member of two of Ethiopia's most influential noble families. Empress Medferiashwork was the daughter-in-law of Emperor Haile Selassie.

Medferiashwork Abebe Damtew married Crown Prince Asfaw Wossen Haile Selassie in 1945, and they had three daughters (Princess Maryam Senna, Princess Sehin Azebe and Princess Sifrash Bizu) and a son, Prince Zera Yacob.

Princess Medferiashwork was said to have played a key role in organizing the opposition to the attempted 1960 coup against Emperor Haile Selassie. Her husband had been coerced into reading a radio statement declaring that he was to henceforth assume his father's throne as a "salaried monarch" and also announce far reaching political reforms. The Crown Princess was one of the few members of the Imperial family not placed under detention, and she played a role in getting the members of the nobility that had not been detained together with the leaders of the Army in order to crush the Imperial Guard which had launched the coup.

In 1973, when her husband had a massive stroke, she accompanied him to Geneva, Switzerland where he was undergoing treatment. At this time, as the government in Ethiopia was faced with growing dissent, and the health of the Crown Prince was despaired of, the Prime Minister prevailed on the Emperor to name an "acting Crown Prince" or Heir Presumptive with the expectation that the Heir Apparent did not have long to live. Her son Zera Yacob was named Acting Crown Prince and Heir Presumptive by Emperor Haile Selassie, with the expectation that he would be named Crown Prince and Heir Apparent upon the expected death of his father. Instead, the Derg seized power and proclaimed her husband "King-designate", but as he refused to recognize this proclamation, the couple continued to use the titles and dignity of Crown Prince and Crown Princess. The Crown Prince Asfaw Wossen recovered sufficiently to allow the couple to move to London with their children where they lived in exile for over 15 years.

In 1989, when Prince Asfaw Wossen assumed the title "Emperor-in-exile" with the name "Amha Selassie I", he bestowed the title of Empress upon Medferiashwork. Amha Selassie and Medferiashwork moved to the Virginia suburbs of Washington, D.C., in 1990 to be near the large Ethiopian community there. Accorded courtesies and homage of an Empress-consort, Medferiashwork lived with her husband in Virginia until his death in February, 1997. She and her children accompanied his body back to Ethiopia and held Ethiopia's first royal funeral since the revolution. After her husband's death, she lived much more quietly, eventually settling in Addis Ababa. She attended the re-burial of her father-in-law Haile Selassie in November 2000, and the funeral of her sister-in-law and aunt by marriage, Princess Tenagnework in 2005. Medferiashwork died on March 13, 2009, after a long illness. In a departure from recent practice and in compliance with her wishes, Empress Medferiashwork was not entombed with other members of the Imperial family in the crypt of Holy Trinity Cathedral. Instead she was buried in the church yard of the cathedral alongside her mother in the section reserved for exiles of the Italian occupation. The Empress had lived in exile with her parents and sister in Jerusalem during the occupation of Ethiopia from 1936 to 1941.

== Patronages ==
- Patroness of the Monastery of St. Mary at Gishen.

== Honours ==
=== National honours ===
- Grand Collar and Chain of the Order of Solomon.
- Gran Cordon of the Order of the Star of Solomon.
- Grand Cordon of the Order of the Queen of Sheba (8 April 1945).
- Jubilee Medal (1955).
- Jubilee Medal (1966).

=== Foreign honours ===
- Member of the Order of the Seraphim (Kingdom of Sweden, 19 December 1959).
- Dame Grand Cross of the Order of St Olav (Kingdom of Norway, January 1956).
- Dame Grand Cross of the Order of Beneficence (Kingdom of Greece, April 1959).

== Ancestry ==
Ancestors of Medferiashwork Abebe

8. Balambaras Ketena Abebe
4. Fitawrari Damtew Ketena
2. Major-General Dejazmatch Abebe Damtew
1. Itege Medferiashwork Abebe
6. Ras Bitwodad Mangasha Atikam, Viceroy of Gojjam
3. Woizero Wosenyelesh
7. Woizero Sifrash Bizu Yifru
