= Salesi =

Salesi is a given name. Notable people with the given name include:

- Salesi Junior Fainga'a (born 1998), Fijian rugby league player
- Salesi Finau (born 1973), Tongan rugby player
- Salesi Foketi (born 2005), New Zealand rugby league player
- Salesi Ma'afu (born 1983), Australian rugby union player
- Salesi Manu (born 1990), Australian rugby union player
- Salesi Moa (born 2007), American football player
- Salesi Rayasi (born 1996), New Zealand rugby union player
- Salesi Sika (born 1980), Tongan-born American rugby union player
- Salesi Temo (fl. 2000), Fijian jurist

== See also ==
- Selasi
- Selassie
