= Selasi =

Selasi can be both a masculine given name and a surname. Notable people with the name include:

== As a given name ==
- Selasi Adjei (born 1993), Ghanaian football forward
- Selasi Berdie (born 1986), Australian rugby league football prop

== As a surname ==
- Ransford Selasi (born 1996), Ghanaian football midfielder
- Taiye Selasi (born 1979), British-American author and filmmaker

== See also ==
- Salesi
- Selassie
