= Wolete Israel Seyoum =

Ethiopian noble (1907–1989)

- Born: 1907; Tigray Province, Ethiopian Empire
- Died: 1989 (aged 81–82); Addis Ababa, Ethiopia
- Spouse: Dejazmach Gebreselassie Bariagaber (died) Crown Prince Asfaw Wossen (m. 1931; div. 1941)
- Issue: Dejazmach Zewde Gebreselassie; Leult Ijigayehu Amha Selassie
Names
- Walatta Israel
- House: House of Solomon (by marriage)
- Father: Leul Ras Seyoum Mengesha
- Mother: Woizero Debretu
- Religion: Ethiopian Orthodox Tewahedo

Wolete Israel Seyoum (1907–1989) was the daughter of Leul Ras Seyoum Mengesha, Prince of Tigray, KBE, and great-granddaughter of Emperor Yohannes IV of Ethiopia.

== Biography ==
Woizero Wolete was thus the sister of Leul Ras Mengesha Seyoum. She was first married to the much older Dejazmach Gebre Selassie Baria Gebir of Adwa, CBE, Nibure Id of Axum by whom she had a son, Dejazmach Zewde Gebreselassie. She was widowed not long after the birth of her son.

She then married Crown Prince Asfaw Wossen in 1931. The marriage of Crown Prince Asfaw Wossen and Crown Princess Wolete Israel was part of Emperor Haile Selassie's efforts at forging closer bonds between the western Tigrean branch of the Imperial family and his own Shewan branch. At the same time that Princess Wolete Israel married the Crown Prince, her cousin (and her father's rival for primacy in Tigray), Dejazmach Haile Selassie Gugsa of the eastern Tigrean branch of the Imperial dynasty was married to the Emperor's daughter Princess Zenebework. It was hoped that these marriages would ensure closer bonds between the two rival princely houses of Tigray with the Emperor's family. Princess Wolete Israel and Prince Asfaw Wossen had a daughter, Princess Ijigayehu.

The Crown Prince and Crown Princess separated during their exile from Ethiopia between 1936 and 1941, and the Princess left England where the Imperial family had taken refuge during the Italian occupation. She went with her children to Egypt where she remained for the duration of the exile. The Crown Prince and Crown Princess divorced in 1941, and the Princess never married again.

Princess Wolete Israel was a devout member of the Ethiopian Orthodox Tewahedo Church, and apparently a talented artist who liked to paint religious paintings and icons. Her grandson, Lij Isaac Fikre Selassie is a noted artist who credits his grandmother as one of his artistic inspirations.

The Princess lived quietly in Addis Ababa and the town of Adama during the rule of the Derg. She was the only princess not placed under arrest during their rule.

== Honours ==
=== National honours ===
- Grand Collar and Chain of the Order of Solomon (9 May 1932).
- Refugee Medal (1944).
- Jubilee Medal (1955).
- Jubilee Medal (1966).

== Ancestry ==
Ancestors of Wolete Israel Seyoum

16. Dejazmatch Mercha, Shum of Tembien
8. Emperor Yohannes IV of Ethiopia
17. Woizero Silass Dimtsu
4. Ras Mangasha Yohannes, Prince of Tigray
18. Dejazmatch Dimtsu Debbeb
9. Woizero Walatta Takla Haymanot
19. Woizero Tabutu
2. Leul Ras Seyoum Mengesha
10. Ras Wale Betul Abba Tattan, Viceroy of Tigray
5. Woizero Kafay Wale
1. Woizero Wolete Israel Seyoum
3. Woizero Debretu

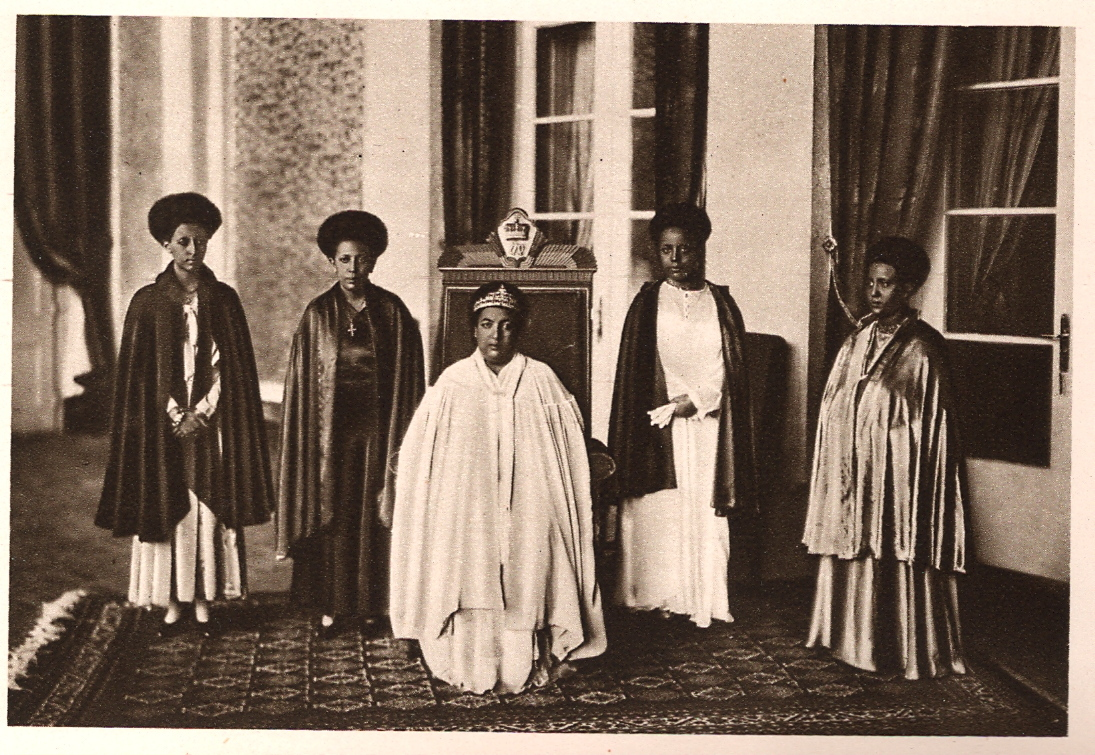
Empress Menen Asfaw is in the centre and her daughter-in-law, Princess Wolete Israel Seyoum, is on the far right. The other standing women from left to right are Princess Tsehai, Princess Tenagnework and Princess Zenebework, daughters of Emperor Haile Selassie.

== See also ==
- Princess Ijigayehu Amha Selassie - Daughter
