= Gaston Doumergue =

President of France from 1924 to 1931

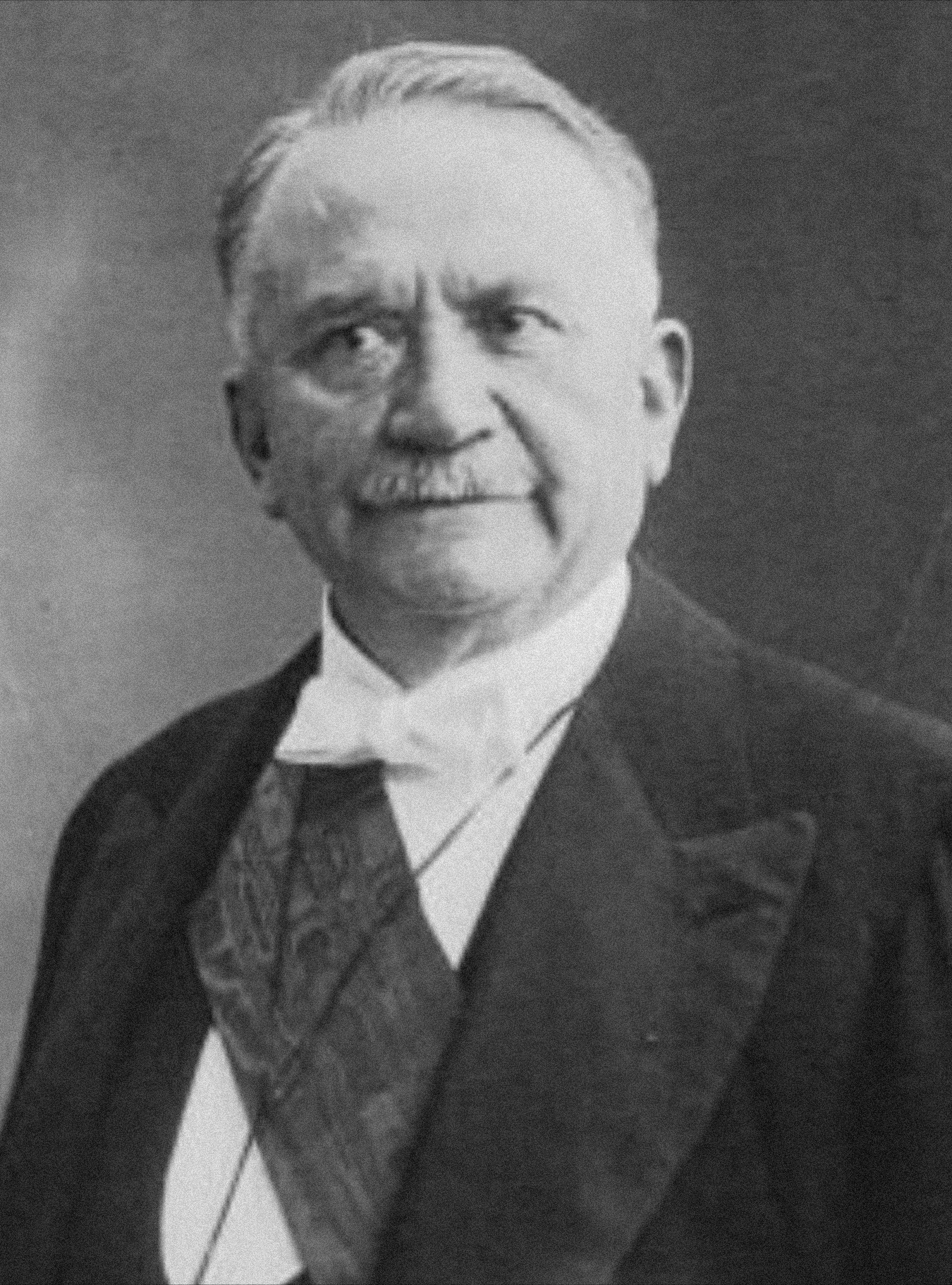
- Doumergue in 1924

President of France
- In office 13 June 1924 – 13 June 1931
- Prime Minister: See list: Frédéric François-Marsal; Édouard Herriot; Paul Painlevé; Aristide Briand; Raymond Poincaré; André Tardieu; Camille Chautemps; Théodore Steeg; Pierre Laval
- Preceded by: Frédéric François-Marsal (as Acting President); Alexandre Millerand (as President)
- Succeeded by: Paul Doumer

Prime Minister of France
- In office 9 February 1934 – 8 November 1934
- President: Albert Lebrun
- Preceded by: Édouard Daladier
- Succeeded by: Pierre-Étienne Flandin
- In office 9 December 1913 – 9 June 1914
- President: Raymond Poincaré
- Preceded by: Louis Barthou
- Succeeded by: Alexandre Ribot

Personal details
- Born: Pierre Paul Henri Gaston Doumergue; 1 August 1863 Aigues-Vives, France
- Died: 18 June 1937 (aged 73) Aigues-Vives, France
- Party: Radical
- Spouse: Jeanne Gaussal
- Education: University of Paris

Pierre Paul Henri Gaston Doumergue (French: [ɡastɔ̃ dumɛʁɡ]; 1 August 1863 – 18 June 1937) was a French politician who served as President of France from 1924 to 1931.

Tasked with important ministerial portfolios, he was first appointed President of the Council of Ministers in 1913, but was forced to leave power a few months after his appointment. He was elected as President of the Senate in 1923. At the end of his mandate as President of France, refusing to compete against his eventual successor, Doumergue retired, but chaired a government of national unity during the crisis created by the riots of 6 February 1934.

== Early life and career ==
=== Protestant origins ===
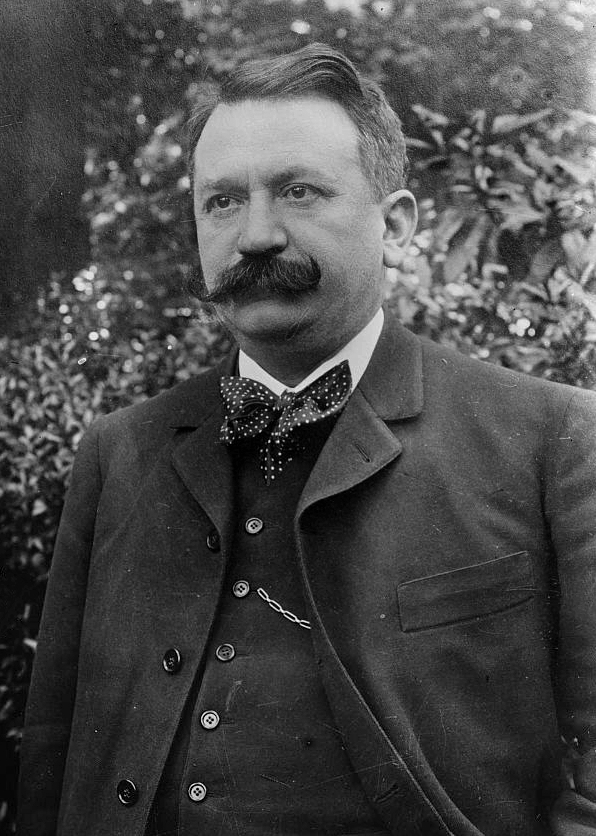
Doumergue, c. 1910–1915

Gaston Doumergue came from a Protestant family. He was born 1 August 1863. His father, Pierre Doumergue, was a vigneron in Aigues-Vives. His mother, Françoise Pattus, raised him in the Protestant faith and the admiration of republican ideas. He was also the great-uncle of playwright Colette Audry and filmmaker Jacqueline Audry.

A brilliant student, he claimed to have belonged to the "generation of revenge, animated by a beautiful patriotic ardour", after the defeat of 1870. He studied at the boys' high school in Nîmes, the future Alphonse-Daudet high school.

=== Judiciary ===
After a license and a doctorate in law at the School of Law of Paris, he registered in 1885 at the Nîmes bar and participated in the resounding trial of deputy Numa Gilly, before entering the judiciary in 1890 as a substitute in Hanoi, French Indochina. His time there was brief because he returned to France on the death of his father in 1891. (Note: His mother died in 1920.)

== Political career ==
=== Beginnings in Parliament (1893–1901) ===
In 1893, while he was a justice of the peace for the commune of Aïn El Arbaa, he returned to Aigues-Vives in France and presented his candidacy for a partial legislative election in December 1893, intended to fill the seat of Émile Jamais, a longtime friend who had just been re-elected in the August 1893 election but died suddenly on 18 November, before the opening of the parliamentary session. Nothing destined him for politics and his grandfather had even refused an appointment as mayor of the village in 1836 because of the modesty of his fortune in a tax system.

Encouraged by his mother who followed his career step-by-step, Doumergue was elected as the Radical deputy for Nîmes with 10,101 votes, beating, in the second round, the mayor of Nîmes, Gaston Maruéjol, who obtained only 24 votes. He attended the banquet given in Lyon by President Sadi Carnot on 24 June 1894, during which the latter was fatally stabbed by the Italian anarchist Sante Geronimo Caserio. This event made him realize the seriousness and the danger of the use of power.

He was re-elected deputy on 8 May 1898, in the first round of the ballot, with 11,514 votes against the conservative Albert de Nesmes-Desmarets. He was very involved in France's colonial policy and, during his speeches at the podium (which were well-received on the left benches), criticized successive governments for their military interventionism and in particular the occupation of Madagascar. From 1894, he also denounced the "benevolent indifference and not the pronounced sympathy" of public opinion vis-à-vis colonial policy, which masked the looting of conquered territories and the violence of the administration.

His secular and republican convictions made him side with Alfred Dreyfus. His successive mandates were also an opportunity for him to defend small agricultural producers. His influence within the left grew. He was elected deputy for the third time on 27 April 1902, in the first round.

A freemason since 1901, he was initiated into the lodge L'Écho du Grand Orient at the Orient of Nîmes, Grand Orient de France.

=== Ministerial portfolios (1902–1910) ===
Under the presidency of Émile Loubet, he was Minister of the Colonies in the Émile Combes government from 1902 to 1905.

He was minister without interruption from 1906 to 1910, first for Trade and Industry, where he created the direction of the merchant navy, then for Public Instruction and Fine Arts from 1908, replacing Aristide Briand. In this capacity, on 4 June 1908, he delivered a speech on behalf of the government of Georges Clemenceau during the transfer of Émile Zola's ashes to the Panthéon, praising the "heroism" of the writer just as he, on 19 March the previous year, had defended the organization of the transfer ceremony on the Assembly platform, against the anti-Dreyfusards.

A fervent supporter of secular schools, he unleashed the most violent school war in the history of France by filing two "secular defense" projects in June 1908 aimed at punishing families who prevented their children from following an education, even an anti-Catholic one. For this, he received the nickname of "escapee from St. Bartholomew" from the polemicist Édouard Drumont. In the field of education, Doumergue also pleaded in favour of the teaching of Arabic in French Algeria.

He also became vice-president of the Chamber of Deputies for a year, from February 1905 to March 1906, between his two ministries. In 1910, he was elected senator for Gard, after the death of Frédéric Desmons. Doumergue was re-elected in 1912 and 1921.

=== First government (1913–1914) ===
From 9 December 1913 to 8 June 1914 he was President of the Council and Minister of Foreign Affairs at the request of President Raymond Poincaré, who sought in Doumergue a conciliator capable of forming a cabinet of "republican harmony". From then on, Doumergue strove to reconcile the demands of the Radical party and the interests of the country, in an international horizon that was becoming darker: the statesman took precedence over the partisan. Doumergue needed to defend the law on three-year military service, which he voted through, not without scrutiny, in August 1913: "None of you is expecting us to reopen the debate: that's the law." The proposal to create an income tax by the finance minister, Joseph Caillaux, triggered a controversy among the conservatives, but was finally voted on in July 1914 by a Senate which had been hostile to it for five years. The "Calmette affair", which led to the resignation of the minister, put the government in a difficult position as the tenth legislature ended and a delicate electoral campaign began. Doumergue had, however, warned that he "would in no case stay after the elections".

It was time for a policy of rearmament and closer alliances, which Poincaré and Doumergue carried out successfully. However, Doumergue did not lose sight of the international situation, and the chancelleries were constantly kept on alert. The Radical party easily came out on top in the 1914 French legislative election and this left-wing majority, elected on the theme of peace, caused the President great difficulty in constituting a cabinet that could succeed Doumergue. The latter took advantage of the end of his functions to undertake a trip to Upper Austria.

On 3 August 1914, the day of Germany's declaration of war on France, marking the start of World War I, the new president of the council, René Viviani, called on Doumergue to replace him at the Ministry of Foreign Affairs, during the composition of his short-lived first government. Then, he was minister of the colonies in the successive governments from 26 August 1914 to 19 March 1917. During this mandate, in the middle of the war, he ensured the security of French possessions and set up a secret agreement with Tsar Nicholas II of Russia which defined the demands that France and Russia would make in future peace negotiations with Germany and Austria-Hungary. However, this treaty became null and void following the October Revolution.

In February 1923, he was elected President of the Senate, replacing Léon Bourgeois.

=== President of the Republic (1924–1931) ===
==== Election to the presidency ====
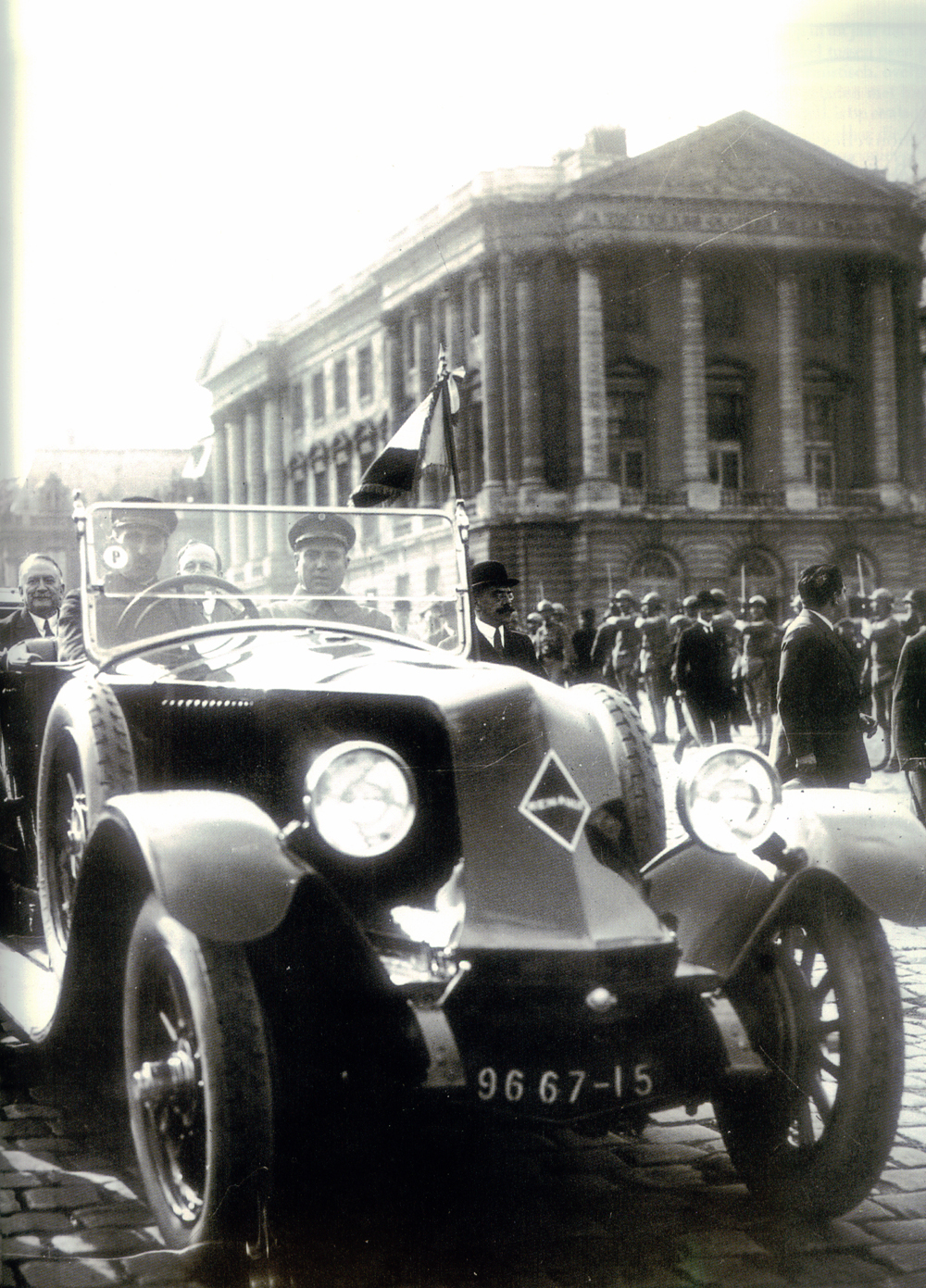
Gaston Doumergue (first from left) during his investiture parade in June 1924, aboard a Renault 40CV

His career culminated with his election as President of the Republic on 13 June 1924, for a seven-year term. This accession to the head of state was the result of several successive political events. The preceding 11 and 25 May saw the victory of the Cartel des Gauches in the legislative elections, despite a higher number of votes for the right and thanks to an electoral law granting a bonus to alliances. Raymond Poincaré, the President of the Council since 1922, having been disavowed, submitted his resignation to President Alexandre Millerand. The cartelists claimed power in the "smallest cogs of the administration". Paul Painlevé was brought to the head of the Chamber thanks to the votes of the Cartel also led by Léon Blum, Édouard Herriot, and Aristide Briand against the candidate of the right, André Maginot. The appointment of Frédéric François-Marsal was taken as a provocation and his government lasted only two days.

Thus, the left, which forced Alexandre Millerand to resign, then believed it could bring Painlevé to the presidency, but the moderates thwarted his ambitions by massively turning to Gaston Doumergue, who already benefitted from some of the votes on the left. He received 515 votes out of 815 voters, against 309 for Painlevé and 21 for Zéphyrin Camélinat, the first communist candidate in a presidential election.

==== Domestic policy ====
He appointed the mayor of Lyon, Édouard Herriot, as head of government and charged him with establishing a policy of symbolic change to satisfy the electorate. The cartel state was installed, with its members holding a majority of the presidencies of parliamentary committees, as well as the major positions in the administration. The scandal of irregularities at the Bank of France overthrew the government and Doumergue resolved to appoint Paul Painlevé as President of the Council in order to unite Radical and socialist voices, playing with designations according to the parliamentary pendulum.

On 5 July 1924 Gaston Doumergue proclaimed the official opening of the 1924 Summer Olympics in Paris during the opening ceremony held at the Stade olympique de Colombes in the presence of the President of the International Olympic Committee, Pierre de Coubertin, the members of the IOC, the President of the French Olympic Committee, Justinien Clary, the members of the FOC, as well as the 44 participating delegations.

Doumergue's seven-year term was marked by the prosperity of France during the interwar period and the Années folles, but also by significant ministerial instability and financial difficulties caused by the fall of the franc. Called to the Ministry of Finance in July 1926, Poincaré instituted a policy of austerity by bringing the franc back to its real value through a sharp devaluation. He also restored confidence and managed to boost a flagging economy. This neo-liberal policy also generated a period of economic and financial prosperity, at a time when the United States was hit hard by the stock market crash of 1929. Progress in technical industry, particularly in the steel industry and automobiles, contributed to the country's growth. Production capacity thus increased by 45% over the 1920s. To support this development, Doumergue reinforced a centrist policy and instituted workers' social insurance.

In May 1930, he went to the departments of Algeria, to the lands he had known in the first years of his career, for the commemorations of the centenary of French Algeria, accompanied by a delegation of eight ministers and of several dozen deputies. The following year, a few weeks before the end of his mandate, he commemorated the fiftieth anniversary of the French protectorate of Tunisia.

==== Foreign policy ====
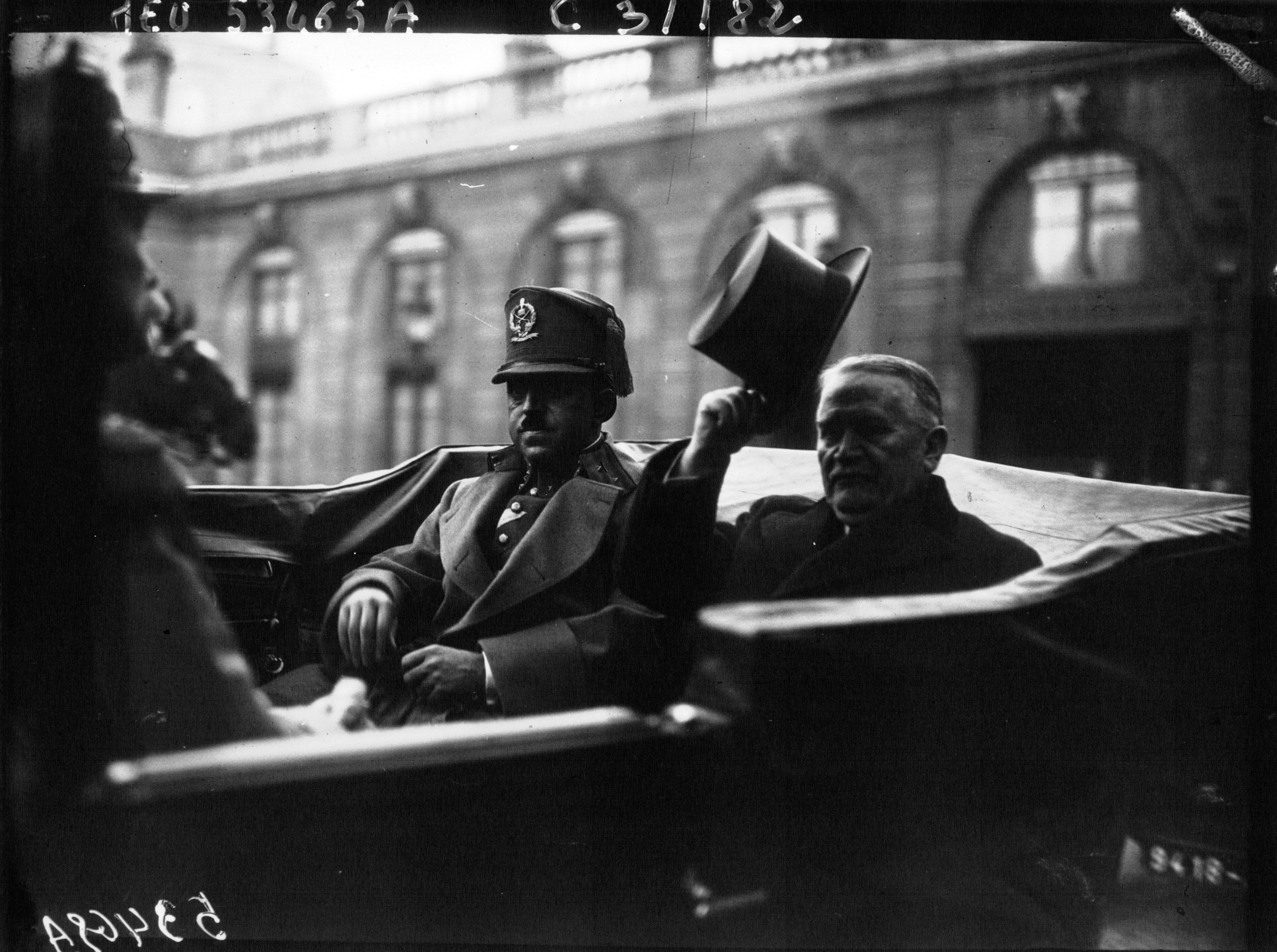
Gaston Doumergue (right) and the King of Afghanistan, Amanullah Khan (1928)

In foreign policy, he declared himself in favour of a policy of firmness vis-à-vis Germany in the face of resurgent nationalism in parts of Europe, but also in France. He ran into difficulties: the Allies were unable to agree on Germany. Forced to evacuate the Ruhr, Saarland, and the Rhineland between 1925 and 1930, Doumergue's France was also duped by the German Chancellor Gustav Stresemann despite the signing of the Locarno Treaties.

Disagreements with his foreign minister, Aristide Briand, only aggravated the colonial crises in Syria and the Rif. After failed attempts at consultation by the prefect in place in Morocco, Doumergue decided to send Marshall Philippe Pétain, who quickly won the Rif War. At the same time, he participated in the inauguration of the Grand Mosque of Paris, with the Moroccan sultan Moulay Youssef, who was on an official visit to France. On this occasion, he became the first French president to quote a hadith: "the best Muslim is the one whose believers have neither hand nor tongue to fear". In French Indochina in the 1920s, the Vietnamese nationalists of the VNQDĐ maintained an independence agitation (assassination of Alfred François Bazin, Yên Bái mutiny, etc.) that colonial authorities repressed with rifle shots and guillotines.

In South America, he helped Marcel Bouilloux-Lafont, the director of the Compagnie générale aéropostale, obtain the postal contracts and flyover rights from Brazil and Argentina necessary for the operation of an air transport line.

==== Particularities of his presidency ====
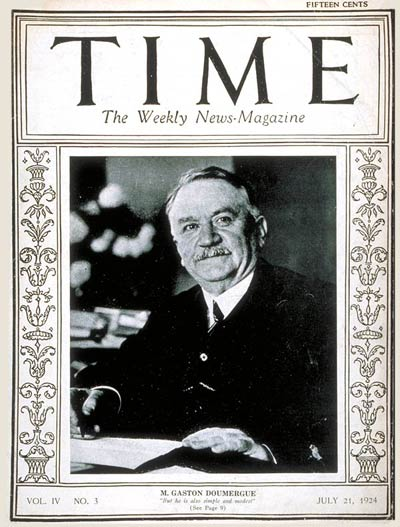
Time cover, 21 July 1924

Within such an unstable political world, Doumergue strove to support the management of public affairs in leftist values and a conservative guideline. An affable and courteous man, he seduced since the beginning of his political career with his good nature and his accent. After his election to the presidency of the Republic, his simplicity continued to earn him popularity in the public opinion, which is reflected in particular by his nickname of "Gastounet".

Moreover, Doumergue's accession to the presidency of the Republic made him the only Protestant head of state known to France since the abjuration of Henry IV, on 25 July 1593. He was also the second unmarried President of the French Republic when he took office, after Napoleon III. Although an "old bachelor", he was nonetheless, according to historian Adrien Dansette, "sensitive to feminine charm", but his frequent passing liaisons were only the "Parisian manners of politicians". He maintained a long-term liaison with Jeanne Gaussal, an associate professor of the university. During his presidential mandate, he had breakfast with her at his former home at 73 Avenue de Wagram every morning, where he went on foot from the Élysée Palace. On 1 June 1931, twelve days before the end of his mandate, he married Gaussal in front of the mayor of the 8th arrondissement of Paris, Gaston Drucker, who had come specially to the Élysée, with the secretary-general of the presidency, Jules Michel, as his witness. Doumergue thus became the first President of the Republic to marry during his mandate.

His presidential mandate ended on 13 June 1931, and he retired from political life to his wife's home in Tournefeuille, in Haute-Garonne.

=== Return to Council Presidency (1934) ===
Still popular, he was recalled as president of the council after the bloody events of 6 February 1934, to form a government of national unity where André Tardieu and Édouard Herriot rubbed shoulders. After having positioned himself at the centre-left of the political spectrum during his first mandate, he gradually neared the centre-right Independent Radicals during his presidency.

His goal was to reform institutions to reduce ministerial instability. This attempt did not succeed; in poor health, it was difficult for him to arbitrate within one of those cabinets in which the greatest hopes are generally placed because they symbolize the unity of the nation, but which are actually made up of ministers from all sides of the political spectrum who do not get along. There was, however, an upturn in public finances, which allowed the price of government bonds to gain ten to twelve points between March and June. He was also weakened by the assassination of Louis Barthou on 9 October, and preferred to resign soon after, on 8 November. René Viviani, who died in 1925, said of him: "In a well-organized democracy, Doumergue would be a justice of the peace in the provinces."

== Death and state funeral ==
Doumergue died on 18 June 1937 at his house in Aigues-Vives, at the age of 73.

The government organized a state funeral for him, which took place in Nîmes. His grave is located in the small cemetery of Aigues-Vives, where his wife Jeanne (née Gaussal) was buried alongside him in 1963.

A bust of Gaston Doumergue is exhibited in the room of the Presidents of the Republic in the Musée de la Révolution française, recalling that he was the first president to be hosted in this former presidential summer residence.

== Doumergue's First Ministry, 9 December 1913 – 9 June 1914 ==
- Gaston Doumergue – President of the Council and Minister of Foreign Affairs
- Joseph Noulens – Minister of War
- René Renoult – Minister of the Interior
- Joseph Caillaux – Minister of Finance
- Albert Métin – Minister of Labour and Social Security Provisions
- Jean-Baptiste Bienvenu-Martin – Minister of Justice
- Ernest Monis – Minister of the Navy
- René Viviani – Minister of Public Instruction and Fine Arts
- Maurice Raynaud – Minister of Agriculture
- Albert Lebrun – Minister of Colonies
- Fernand David – Minister of Public Works
- Louis Malvy – Minister of Commerce, Industry, Posts, and Telegraphs

=== Changes ===
- 17 March 1914 – René Renoult succeeds Caillaux as Finance Minister. Louis Malvy succeeds Renoult as Minister of the Interior. Raoul Péret succeeds Malvy as Minister of Commerce, Industry, Posts, and Telegraphs.
- 20 March 1914 – Armand Gauthier succeeds Monis as Minister of the Navy.

== Doumergue's Second Ministry, 9 February – 8 November 1934 ==
- Gaston Doumergue – President of the Council
- Louis Barthou – Minister of Foreign Affairs
- Philippe Pétain – Minister of War
- Albert Sarraut – Minister of the Interior
- Louis Germain-Martin – Minister of Finance
- Adrien Marquet – Minister of Labour
- Henry Chéron – Minister of Justice
- François Piétri – Minister of Military Marine
- William Bertrand – Minister of Merchant Marine
- Victor Denain – Minister of Air
- Aimé Berthod – Minister of National Education
- Georges Rivollet – Minister of Pensions
- Henri Queuille – Minister of Agriculture
- Pierre Laval – Minister of Colonies
- Pierre-Étienne Flandin – Minister of Public Works
- Louis Marin – Minister of Public Health and Physical Education
- André Mallarmé – Minister of Posts, Telegraphs, and Telephones
- Lucien Lamoureux – Minister of Commerce and Industry
- Édouard Herriot – Minister of State
- André Tardieu – Minister of State

Changes

- 13 October 1934 – Pierre Laval succeeds Barthou (assassinated 9 October) as Minister of Foreign Affairs. Paul Marchandeau succeeds Sarraut as Minister of the Interior. Louis Rollin succeeds Laval as Minister of Colonies.
- 15 October 1934 – Henry Lémery succeeds Chéron as Minister of Justice.

== Honours ==
- Grand Cross of the Order of Saint Charles, 1914
- Grand Cross of the Legion of Honour, 1924, by right as Grand Master of the Order
- Order of the White Eagle, 4 December 1924
- Order of the Royal House of Chakri, 30 January 1925
- Division III, 1st Class of the Cross of Liberty (VR III/1), 29 April 1925
- Knight of the Order of the Golden Fleece, 1926
- Knight Grand Cross of the Equestrian Order of San Marino, 16 September 1926
- Knight of the Order of the Elephant, 12 March 1927
- Commander Grand Cross (with Chain) of the Order of the Three Stars (17 Nov 1928), Commander Grand Cross (6 July 1927)
- Knight of the Order of the Seraphim, 1 August 1927

== See also ==
- Interwar France
- 6 February 1934 crisis
- List of covers of Time magazine (1920s) – 21 July 1924 and 2 August 1926

== Bibliography ==
Documents used for writing this article

- Berstein, Serge (2002). Chef de l'État : l'histoire vivante des 22 présidents à l'épreuve du pouvoir [Head of State: the living history of the 22 presidents put to the test of power]. L'histoire au présent (in French). Paris: Armand Colin. ISBN 2-200-26245-0. ISSN 1637-8156.
- Folch, Arnaud; Perrault, Guillaume (2011). Les présidents de la République [The Presidents of the Republic]. Pour les nuls (in French). Paris: First éditions. ISBN 978-2-7540-2066-4.
- Lafue, Pierre (1933). Gaston Doumergue – Sa vie et son destin [Gaston Doumergue – His life and his destiny] (in French). Librairie Plon.
- Rives, Jean (1992). Gaston Doumergue : du modèle républicain au Sauveur Suprême [Gaston Doumergue: from the republican model to Supreme Saviour] (in French). Toulouse: Presses de l'Institut d'études politiques de Toulouse – via Gallica.
- Robert, Adolphe (1960). Jolly, Jean (ed.). Dictionnaire des parlementaires français : notices biographiques sur les ministres, sénateurs et députés français de 1889 à 1940 [Dictionary of French parliamentarians: biographical notes on French ministers, senators and deputies from 1889 to 1940] (in French). Presses Universitaires de France. pp. 1476–1481. OCLC 444421.

Secondary sources

- Arnoux, Pascal (2001). Histoire des rois de France et des chefs d'État [History of the Kings of France and the Heads of State]. Le présent de l'histoire (in French). Monaco: Éditions du Rocher. pp. 358–359. ISBN 2-268-03925-0.
- Cabanel, Patrick (2020). "Doumergue Gaston". In Encrevé, André; Cabanel, Patrick (eds.). Dictionnaire biographique des protestants français de 1787 à nos jours : D-G [Biographical dictionary of French Protestants from 1787 to the present day: D–G] (in French). Vol. II. Paris: Max Chaleil. pp. 264–265. ISBN 978-2-8462-1288-5.
- Chamboredon, Robert (April 2014). "Gaston Doumergue (1863–1937) : d'Aigues-Vives à l'Élysée" [Gaston Doumergue (1863–1937): from Aigues-Vives to the Élysée]. Revue d'histoire moderne et contemporaine de Nîmes et du Gard (in French) (29). Société d'histoire de Nîmes et du Gard: 91–108. ISSN 1763-4946.
- Duclert, Vincent (2010). Rousso, Henry (ed.). La République imaginée : 1870–1914 [The imagined Republic: 1870–1914]. Histoire de France (in French). Paris: Belin. ISBN 978-2-7011-3388-1.
- Miquel, Pierre (1989). La Troisième République [The Third Republic] (in French). Paris: Fayard. ISBN 2-213-02361-1.
- Néauber and Company, ed. (1904). Dictionnaire biographique et album du Gard [Biographical dictionary and album of Gard]. Les Dictionnaires Départementaux (in French). Paris: Librairie E. Flammarion. p. 220 – via Gallica.
- Simard, Marc (Spring 1990). "Doumergue et la réforme de l'État en 1934 : La Dernière Chance de la IIIe République?" [Doumergue and the reform of the State in 1934: The Last Chance of the Third Republic?]. French Historical Studies (in French). 16 (3): 576–596. doi:10.2307/286488. JSTOR 286488.
- Yvert, Benoît (2007). Premiers ministres et présidents du Conseil : Histoire et dictionnaire raisonné des chefs du gouvernement en France, 1815–2007 [Prime ministers and presidents of the Council: History and reasoned dictionary of the heads of government in France, 1815–2007]. Tempus (in French). Vol. 187. Paris: Perrin. ISBN 978-2-262-02687-5. ISSN 1633-8294.

Political offices
Preceded by Albert Decrais	Minister of Colonies; 1902–1905	Succeeded by Étienne Clémentel
New office	Minister of Labour; 1906	Succeeded by René Viviani
Preceded by Georges Trouillot	Minister of Commerce and Industry; 1906–1908	Succeeded by Jean Cruppi
Preceded by Aristide Briand	Minister of Public Instruction and Fine Arts; 1908–1910	Succeeded by Maurice Faure
Preceded by Louis Barthou	Prime Minister of France; 1913–1914	Succeeded by Alexandre Ribot
Preceded by Stéphen Pichon	Minister of Foreign Affairs; 1913–1914	Succeeded by Léon Bourgeois
Preceded by René Viviani	Minister of Foreign Affairs; 1914	Succeeded by Théophile Delcassé
Preceded by Maurice Raynaud	Minister of Colonies; 1914–1917	Succeeded by André Maginot
Preceded by Léon Bourgeois	President of the Senate; 1923–1924	Succeeded by Justin de Selves
Preceded by Alexandre Millerand	President of France; 1924–1931	Succeeded by Paul Doumer
Preceded by Édouard Daladier	Prime Minister of France; 1934	Succeeded by Pierre Étienne Flandin
Regnal titles
Preceded by Alexandre Millerand	Co-Prince of Andorra; 1924–1931; Served alongside: Justí Guitart i Vilardebó	Succeeded by Paul Doumer
Awards and achievements
Preceded by Alexey Rykov	Cover of Time magazine 21 July 1924	Succeeded by William Sproule
