= Princess Sifrash Bizu =

Ethiopian princess

- Born: 6 May 1959 (age 67); Palace of the Crown Prince, Addis Ababa
- Spouse: Ato Fasil Araya
- Issue: Immabet Aida Fasil; Immabet Rebecca Fasil
- House: Solomonic dynasty
- Father: Amha Selassie of Ethiopia
- Mother: Medferiashwork Abebe
- Religion: Ethiopian Orthodox Tewahedo

Princess (Leult) Sifrash Bizu (born 6 May 1959) is a daughter of Emperor-in-exile Amha Selassie of Ethiopia by Empress Medferiashwork Abebe, his second wife. She is a granddaughter of Emperor Haile Selassie of Ethiopia.

Princess Sifrash Bizu married Ato Fasil Araya, Secretary General of the Awasa Chamber of Commerce. They had two daughters:

- Immabet Aida Fasil.
- Immabet Rebecca Fasil.

== Patronages ==
- President of the Haile Selassie Foundation.

== Honours ==
=== National honours ===
- Emperor Haile Selassie I Jubilee Medal (1966).
