= Ayori Selassie =

American software engineer

- Born: Oakland, CA
- Education: Laney College, San Francisco State University
- Occupation: Software engineer
- Organization(s): Selfpreneur, Pitch Mixer
- Notable work: co-founder of Black Women in Computing

Ayori Selassie is an American software engineer who worked at Salesforce and founded Selfpreneur, a personal development company focusing on the "Life Model Canvas". She also worked with the U.S. State Department on the TechWomen initiative.

== Biography ==
Ayori Selassie was born and raised in Oakland, CA. Her mother was born in Charleston, MS and her father was born in Los Angeles. She was the seventh of eight children, raised by a single mother. Ayori Selassie got into technology because her mother gave her a computer programming book and made her read it. She went to a community college named Laney College and transferred to San Francisco State University, where she held a full-time job to support her family while she was learning software engineering. Selassie now works as a Platform Specialist at Salesforce, and founded her own company, Selfpreneur, for which she invented a personal development framework, the Life Model Canvas.

== Initiatives ==
=== Black Women in Computing ===
Selassie is one of the five co-founders of Black Women in Computing (BWiC), part of the Anita Borg Institute's community groups for women in technology and an "online community created to provide online support, resources" for black women working in tech". They created this initiative to encourage women of color to pursue careers in technology and study in STEM fields.

=== TechWomen ===
She has also worked as part of the TechWomen U.S. Department of State initiative to support emerging leaders in the Middle East and Africa by pairing them with a Silicon Valley mentor.

== Awards ==
- Honored with GHC Women in Computing Award by the Anita Borg Institute of Women in Technology for her contributions to Underrepresented Groups
- Honored as Woman of the Month across the Salesforce organization (nominated by peers & leaders)
- Part of the "40 under 40: Tech Diversity" Silicon Valley awards
