= Haile Selassie (disambiguation) =

Haile Selassie was the emperor of Ethiopia from 1930 to 1974.

Haile Selassie may also refer to:

== People ==
- Imru Haile Selassie (1892-1980), Ethiopian noble, military commander and diplomat.
- Haile Selassie Gugsa (1907–1985), Ethiopian military commander, fascist collaborator, and noble.
- Prince Makonnen (1924-1957), Makonnen Haile Selassie, Ethiopian noble and son of Haile Selassie I.
- Princess Romanework (died 1940), Romanework Haile Selassie, daughter of Haile Selassie I.
- Yohannes Haile-Selassie (born 1961) Ethiopian paleoanthropologist.
- Haile Gebrselassie (born 1973) Ethiopian Businessman and former long-distance runner.
- Maren Haile-Selassie (born 1999), Swiss footballer

== Places ==
- Addis Ababa Bole International Airport, formerly Haile Selassie I International Airport.
- Addis Ababa University, formerly Haile Selassie I University.

== Art ==
- Bust of Haile Selassie, destroyed in 2020.
