= Zera Yacob Amha Selassie =

Current Head of the Imperial House of Ethiopia since 1997

Zera Yacob Amha Selassie ዘርዐ ያዕቆብ አምሃ ሥላሴ

Head of the Imperial House of Ethiopia
- Tenure: 17 February 1997 – present
- Predecessor: Haile Selassie as Emperor of Ethiopia; Amha Selassie as Emperor-in-exile of Ethiopia
- Heir-Presumptive: Prince Mikael, Duke of Harar
- Born: 17 August 1953 (age 73); Addis Ababa, Ethiopian Empire
- Spouse: Nunu Getaneh (divorced)
- Issue: 1
- Dynasty: House of Solomon
- Father: Amha Selassie
- Mother: Medferiashwork Abebe
- Religion: Ethiopian Orthodox Tewahedo

Zera Yacob Amha Selassie (/ˈzɪərə jæˈkoʊb/; Geʽez: ዘርዐ ያዕቆብ አምሃ ሥላሴ; born 17 August 1953) is the grandson of Emperor Haile Selassie and son of Amha Selassie of the Ethiopian Empire. He has been head of the Imperial House of Ethiopia since 17 February 1997 as recognized by the Crown Council of Ethiopia.

He was designated as "acting crown prince" and heir presumptive in 1974 by the Emperor Haile Selassie I close to the end of his reign; however, the Empire was overthrown in the 1974 Ethiopian Revolution by the Derg. As a result, Yacob never became a ruling Emperor of Ethiopia. Ethiopia became a Federal Democratic Republic in 1991.

== Biography ==
Zera Yacob attended Eton College and graduated from Exeter College, Oxford and Sandhurst. He was named Acting Crown Prince and heir presumptive to the Imperial throne of Ethiopia in 1974 by his grandfather, Emperor Haile Selassie, following his father's stroke a year earlier.

After the fall of the Ethiopian monarchy, Zera Yacob completed his studies at Oxford in the 1970s and worked briefly as a banker in the United States. He then moved to London and was married to Princess Nunu (née Getaneh), and later divorced. They had one daughter, Princess Lideta Zera Yacob. He was named heir apparent by his father, who assumed the title of Emperor-in-exile at that time in April 1989 in London.

In 1992 he accompanied his father Amha Selassie to Virginia, United States, where his father had a medical check-up. However, his father suffered a stroke and Zera Yacob stayed for two years. He then applied for a visa following his father's death in 1997. He had returned to London, England, where he had settled in a modest home on the Isle of Dogs.

Yacob has been the Executive Director of the Ethiopian Peace Foundation (EPF) since 2002.

== Honours ==
- Knight Grand Cross of the Order of Saint Lazarus (Orléans-French Royal Family)
- Knight Grand Cordon with Collar of the Imperial Order of St. Andrew (Russian Imperial Family)
- Knight Grand Collar of the Order of the Eagle of Georgia (Georgian Royal Family)

Zera Yacob Amha Selassie House of Solomon Born: 17 August 1953
Titles in pretence
| Preceded by Amha Selassie I | — TITULAR — Emperor of Ethiopia; 17 February 1997 – Present; Reason for succession failure: Empire abolished in 1975 | Incumbent; Heir: Prince Amde Mikael Ijesus, Duke of Harar |
