= Princess Ijigayehu Amha Selassie =

Ethiopian noble (1936–1976)

Princess Ijigayehu Amha Selassie (Princess Ijigayehu Asfaw Wossen)
- Born: 4 September 1936; Dessie, Wollo, Ethiopian Empire
- Died: 23 January 1976 (aged 39); Akaki Prison, Addis Ababa, Ethiopia
- Burial: Ketchene Medhan Alem Church
- Spouse: Dejazmatch Fikre-Selassie Hapte Mariam
- Issue: Prince Samson Fikre Selassie; Princess Rahel Fikre Selassie; Princess Meheret Fikre Selassie; Princess Aster Fikre Selassie; Prince Bekere Fikre Selassie; Prince Yishaq Fikre Selassie
- House: Solomonic dynasty
- Father: Amha Selassie
- Mother: Wolete Israel Seyoum
- Religion: Ethiopian Orthodox Tewahedo

Princess Ijigayehu Amha Selassie (4 September 1936 – 23 January 1976) was the eldest child of Crown Prince Asfaw Wossen of Ethiopia by his first wife, Princess Wolete Israel Seyoum and was the granddaughter to Emperor Haile Selassie.

== Lineage and marriage ==
Through her mother's family she was a great-great-granddaughter of Emperor Yohannes IV. Princess Ijigayehu was married to Dejazmach Fikre Selassie Habte-Mariam, the heir to the old Welega Kingdom of Leqa Naqamte, and brother to Woizero Atsede Habte-Mariam (wife of General Mulugeta Bulli) and Princess Mahisente Habte Mariam (wife of Prince Sahle Selassie). Dejazmach Fikre Selassie and Princess Ijigayehu were the parents of six children (all created Princes and Princesses by their grandfather Emperor Amha Selassie while in exile):

- Prince Samson Fikre Selassie (born 10 October 1954).
- Princess Rahel Fikre Selassie (born 18 December 1956).
- Princess Meheret Fikre Selassie (born 20 December 1958).
- Princess Aster Fikre Selassie (born 28 April 1960).
- Prince Bekere Fikre Selassie (born 1962).
- Prince Yishaq Fikre Selassie (born 1964), married in 1994 to Asqual Teferi, member of the Ethiopian nobility (her sister Abebech married a grandson of Empress Menen Asfaw). They had two daughters:
  - Princess Ijigayehu Fikre Selassie (born 1998).
  - Princess Lissan Fikre Selassie (born 2002). She was presented as a debutante at the famous "Bal des débutantes" At Shangri-La Paris hotel in Paris in 2023, where she made her social debut.

Princess Ijigayehu notably accompanied her grandfather Emperor Haile Selassie on his state visit to Italy and also on his state visits to South Korea, Australia, and Malaysia.

== Derg Uprising ==
Princess Ijigayehu was imprisoned with the rest of the Imperial family on September 11, 1974, the day before Emperor Haile Selassie was deposed by the Derg. She died in early 1976 after medical neglect while still in prison. She was buried at the Ketchene Medhan Alem Church in Addis Ababa by her children and her mother who were under surveillance but not imprisoned. Early the following year, all her children, along with other children of the Imperial family, escaped from Ethiopia. Her husband remained imprisoned for 8 years and died in August 1996.

== Honours ==
=== National ===
- Dame Grand Cordon of the Order of the Queen of Sheba
- Refugee Medal (1944)
- Jubilee Medal (1955)
- Emperor Haile Selassie I Jubilee Medal (1966)

=== Foreign ===
- Dame Grand Cross of the Order of Beneficence (Kingdom of Greece, 04/1959)
- Dame Grand Cross of the Order of Queen Kossomak (Kingdom of Cambodia, 04/05/1968)
- Dame Grand Cross of the Order of Merit of the Italian Republic (Italian Republic, 06/11/1970)

== Ancestry ==
Ancestors of Princess Ijigayehu Amha Selassie

8. Ras Mäkonnen Wäldä-Mika'él Guddisa
4. Emperor Haile Selassie I
9. Woizero Yeshimebet Ali Abba Jifar
2. Amha Selassie, Crown Prince of Ethiopia
10. Dejazmach Asfaw Mikael, Jantirar of Ambassel
5. Itege Menen Asfaw
11. Woizero Sehin Mikael
1. Princess Ijigayehu Selassie of Ethiopia
12. Ras Mangasha Yohannes, Prince of Tigray
6. Leul Ras Seyoum Mengesha
13. Woizero Kafay Wale
3. Leult (Princess) Wolete Israel Seyoum
7. Woizero Debretu
