= Amha Selassie =

Emperor-in-exile of Ethiopia (1916–1997)

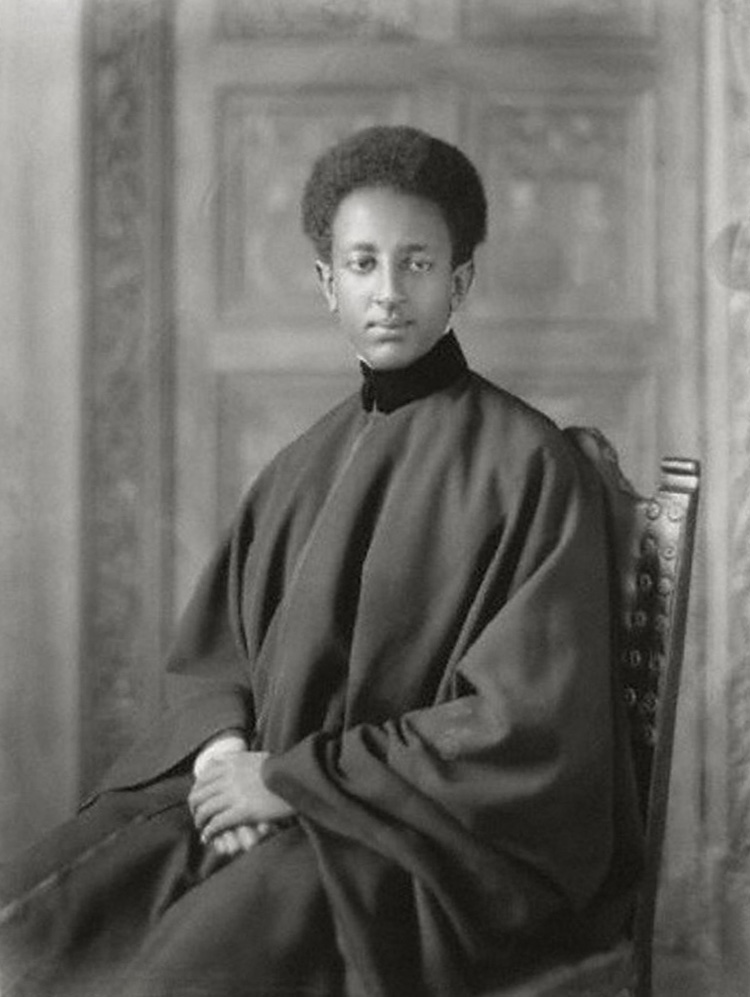
- Amha Selassie in 1932

King of Ethiopia (designate, unacknowledged)
- Reign: 12 September 1974 – 21 March 1975
- Predecessor: Haile Selassie as Emperor of Ethiopia
- Successor: Monarchy abolished
- Chairman De facto: Aman Andom; Tafari Benti

Emperor of Ethiopia (in exile)
- Reign: 8 April 1989 – 17 January 1997
- Predecessor: Haile Selassie
- Heir-apparent: Zera Yacob
- Born: Asfaw Wossen Tafari; 27 July 1916; Harar, Ethiopian Empire
- Died: 17 January 1997 (aged 80); McLean, Virginia, U.S.
- Burial: Holy Trinity Cathedral, Addis Ababa
- Spouse: Wolete Israel Seyoum (m. 1931; div. 1941) Medferiashwork Abebe (m. 1945)
- Issue: Princess Ijigayehu; Princess Maryam Senna; Princess Sehin Azebe; Princess Sifrash Bizu; Crown Prince Zera Yacob
- House: House of Solomon
- Father: Haile Selassie
- Mother: Menen Asfaw
- Religion: Ethiopian Orthodox Tewahedo

Amha Selassie (Ge'ez: አምሃ ሥላሴ, romanized: Amihā Śəllāse, lit. 'Salute of the Trinity'; born Asfaw Wossen Tafari; 27 July 1916 – 17 January 1997) was Emperor-in-exile of Ethiopia. As son of Haile Selassie, he was Crown Prince and was proclaimed monarch three times. He was first proclaimed Emperor during an unsuccessful coup attempt against his father in December 1960, during which he alleged that he was detained and compelled to accept the title. After his father was deposed in a later coup, he was proclaimed King (not Emperor) in absentia by the Derg on 12 September 1974 in an act which he never accepted as legitimate and that ended in the abolition of the Ethiopian monarchy on 21 March 1975. He was again proclaimed Emperor in exile on 8 April 1989. This time he sanctioned the proclamation and accepted its legitimacy. After his accession, his full regnal style was His Imperial Majesty Emperor Amha Selassie I, Elect of God, Conquering Lion of the Tribe of Judah and King of Kings of Ethiopia.

== Biography ==
Asfaw Wossen Tafari was born in the walled city of Harar, to Dejazmach Tafari Makonnen, then the governor of Harar and future Emperor of Ethiopia, and his wife Menen Asfaw, on 29 July 1916.

Amha Selassie became Crown Prince Asfaw Wossen of Ethiopia when his father was crowned Emperor on 2 November 1930. Crown Prince Asfaw Wossen was granted the title of Meridazmach and the province (former kingdom) of Wollo to rule as his fief. He was married to Princess Wolete Israel Seyoum, great-granddaughter of Emperor Yohannes IV, and had a daughter, Princess Ijigayehu. Following the Italian invasion of Ethiopia in 1935, the Crown Prince and Princess went into exile with the rest of the Imperial family. They separated around 1938, and eventually divorced in 1941.

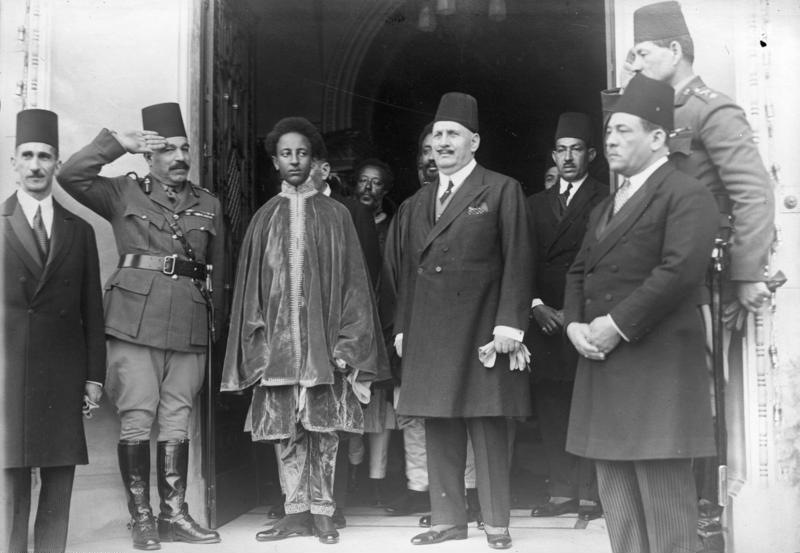
Asfaw Wossen with King Fuad I of the Kingdom of Egypt in 1931

Following Emperor Haile Selassie's restoration in 1941, the Crown Prince returned to Ethiopia, and participated in the campaign to drive the Italian forces out of the city of Gondar, the last town they held in Ethiopia. He briefly served as acting governor of the provinces of Begemder and Tigray, retaining Wollo the entire time. He was eventually remarried to Princess Medferiashwork Abebe, and would father three more daughters, Princesses Mariam Senna, Sefrash, Sehin, and a son Prince Zera Yacob.

On the evening of 13 December 1960, the commander of the Imperial Guard, Mengistu Neway, with his brother Germame Neway launched a coup d'état and seized power in Ethiopia while the Emperor was on a visit to Brazil. The coup leaders allegedly detained Crown Prince Asfaw Wossen in the Imperial Palace, and the following morning, having secured control over most of the capital, then allegedly compelled the Crown Prince to read a radio statement, in which he accepted the crown in his father's place and announced a government of reform. However, the regular Army, led by Dejazmach Asrate Medhin Kassa and Chief of Staff, Major General Mared Mangesha, spent the following day gaining control of other military formations, as well as the Air Force; later that day Patriarch Abuna Basilios of the Ethiopian Orthodox Church, issued an anathema against all those who cooperated with the rebels. On 15 December fighting broke out in the city, and the rebels were driven out of Addis Ababa; before retreating the rebels slaughtered many members of the government and the nobility held hostage in the Green Salon of the palace. Among the dead were Abebe Aregai and Seyum Mangasha. The Emperor returned to Ethiopia, entering the capital on 17 December. Although it was alleged that the Crown Prince had acted under duress, his outlook had long been regarded as considerably more liberal than that of his father, and so he would always be suspected of having been a willing participant in the coup attempt. By contrast, Medferiashwork Abebe, the wife of the Crown Prince, is credited with playing a role against the coup attempt. In 1974 the Crown Prince Asfaw Wossen said that he "undoubtedly not only knew about the revolution ahead of time, he was also part of the people who had organized it."

At the age of 58 in late 1972, after his father Emperor Haile Selassie blamed him for hiding the realities of the famine in the region which he presided over as Duke (Wollo) from him, Crown Prince Asfaw Wossen suffered a massive stroke and was evacuated for medical treatment to London and Switzerland. He was accompanied by his wife and daughters. The stroke left him permanently paralyzed on one side and unable to walk, and also affected his speech. As Prince Asfaw Wossen was not expected to live, his son, Prince Zera Yacob, a student at Oxford at the time, was named "Acting Crown Prince" and "Heir Presumptive".

== Short reign ==
The so-called "short reign" of Amha Selassie in 1974 was in name only between the dethronement of his father on 12 September 1974 until the abolition of the monarchy in March 1975. Amha Selassie had been out of the country for medical treatment when the coup occurred.

Haile Selassie had never signed an abdication or renounced his status as Emperor. The military junta declared the Crown Prince "King" instead of "Emperor", but he never acknowledged the title nor accepted his father's dethronement. When the new government massacred 61 ex-officials of the Imperial government, Crown Prince Asfaw Wossen issued a strong denunciation that was broadcast on the BBC. The statement was issued in the name of "Crown Prince Asfaw Wossen" which indicated that he did not recognize the Derg's declaration of him as monarch in his father's place. He continued to use the title of Crown Prince during his exile until April 1989, when he finally assumed the title of Emperor with the regnal name of Amha Selassie I. His succession was back-dated, not to 12 September 1974, when his father was deposed, but to 27 August 1975, when his father died. He reiterated his view that all of the Derg regime's acts were illegitimate and illegal.

== Life in exile ==
On 12 September 1974, the Derg military junta deposed Emperor Haile Selassie and declared that Crown Prince Asfaw Wossen would be anointed "King" upon his return from medical treatment in Geneva, Switzerland. The Derg stated that it intended for Asfaw to rule as a constitutional monarch.

However, the prince did not recognize this proclamation and did not return to Ethiopia. When he instead announced to the Ethiopian Embassy in London that he would be moving to that city shortly, the Embassy asked the Derg for instructions as to whether it should receive him as a king and head-of-state, or if it should receive him as crown prince upon his arrival in the United Kingdom. The Derg replied that he should be received as a simple citizen of Ethiopia and that no royal dignities were to be accorded to the prince or his family. The revolutionaries soon abolished the monarchy in March 1975, and crown prince Asfaw Wossen settled permanently in London, where several other members of the imperial family were already based. The other members of the imperial family who were still in Ethiopia at the time of the revolution were imprisoned, including Asfaw Wossen's father, the emperor, his daughter by his first marriage, Princess Ijigayehu, his sister Princess Tenagnework and many of his nephews, nieces, relatives and in-laws. In 1975, first his father, Emperor Haile Selassie, and then in January 1977, his daughter, Princess Ijigayehu, died in detention. Members of the Imperial family remained imprisoned until 1989 (for the women) and 1990 (for the men).

In April 1989, Crown Prince Asfaw Wossen was proclaimed "Emperor of Ethiopia" in exile, at his home in London by members of the exiled Ethiopian community. He took the throne name of Amha Selassie I. His wife began also using the title of "Empress". A year later, the emperor- and empress-in-exile moved to McLean, Virginia, USA to be close to the large Ethiopian immigrant population in and around Washington, D.C.

In 1991, with the fall of the Derg, and the coming to power of the EPRDF in Ethiopia, Amha Selassie founded the Moa Anbessa Monarchist Movement to promote a monarchial restoration in Ethiopia, and announced his intention to return to his country for a visit. However, following the disinterment of the remains of Emperor Haile Selassie, a dispute erupted between the imperial family and the new government over the status of a funeral that was planned for the late emperor. The government refused to give Haile Selassie a state funeral; consequently, the funeral, and the return of Amha Selassie, were indefinitely postponed.

== Death ==
Amha Selassie died at the age of 80 on 17 January 1997, after long illnesses, in the US state of Virginia. He had never completely recovered from the stroke he had experienced in 1972. At the time his son, Zera-Jakob Selassie was living on the Isle of Dogs, London. However, when he applied for a visa so that he could preside over a funeral held in the US, he was refused a visa. When he applied a second time, he was told never to apply again. Dennis Wolf, a spokesperson for the US Embassy in London explained that Zera-Jakob had failed to convince the authorities that he had a residence outside the USA – despite having housing in the UK. After this, arrangements were made for Amha Selassie's body which was flown back to Ethiopia and buried in the Imperial family vaults at Holy Trinity Cathedral in Addis Ababa in a large ceremonial funeral presided over by Patriarch Abune Paulos.

== Orders, decorations and honours ==
=== Orders and decorations ===
Amha Selassie was awarded numerous honours, including:

==== National ====
- Grand Cordon and Collar of the Order of Solomon (1930)
- Grand Cordon of the Order of the Seal of Solomon
- Grand Cordon of the Order of the Holy Trinity
- Grand Cordon of the Order of Menelik II
- Grand Cross and Collar of the Order of the Star of Ethiopia
- Distinguished Military Medal of Haile Selassie

==== Foreign ====
- Grand Cordon of the Order of Leopold, military division (Belgium, 1958)
- Grand Cross of the Order of the Southern Cross (Brazil, 4 July 1958)
- Order of the Elephant (Denmark, 15 January 1970)
- Collar of the Order of Muhammad Ali (Egypt, 1932)
- Collar of the Order of the Nile (Egypt)
- Grand Cross of the Order of the Black Star (France, 30 October 1930)
- Grand Cross of the Legion of Honour (France, 2 January 1932)
- Grand Cross 1st Class of the Order of Merit of the Federal Republic of Germany (Germany)
- Honorary Companion of the Order of the Star of Ghana (Ghana, 1970)
- Grand Cross of the Order of the Redeemer (Greece, 1959)
- Grand Cross of the Order of Saints Maurice and Lazarus (Italy, 1932)
- Order of the Chrysanthemum (Japan)
- Grand Cordon of the Order of the Rising Sun (Japan)
- Grand Cordon of the Order of the Star of Jordan (Jordan, 1960)
- Grand Cordon National Order of the Cedar (Lebanon)
- Grand Cross of the Order of the Netherlands Lion (Netherlands, 7 November 1953)
- Grand Cross of the Order of St Olav (Norway, 1956)
- Grand Cross of the Order of Polonia Restituta (Poland, 30 October 1930)
- Order of the Star of Romania, 1st Class (Romania, 1967)
- Grand Cross of the Order of Isabella the Catholic (Spain, 27 April 1971)
- Commander Grand Cross of the Order of Vasa (Sweden, 9 January 1935)
- Knight of the Royal Order of the Seraphim (Sweden, 15 November 1954)
- Grand Cordon Special Class of the Order of the White Elephant (Thailand, 1970)
- Grand Cordon Special Class of the Order of the Crown of Thailand (Thailand)
- Recipient of the Queen Elizabeth II Coronation Medal (United Kingdom, 1953)
- Honorary Knight Grand Cross of the Order of St Michael and St George (United Kingdom, 1958)
- Grand Cross of the Order of Pope Pius IX (Vatican, 1932)

=== Honorary military ranks ===
Amha Selassie held the following military ranks:

- Field Marshal, Imperial Ethiopian Army
- Admiral of the Fleet, Imperial Ethiopian Navy
- Marshal, Imperial Ethiopian Air Force

== Ancestry ==
Ancestors of Amha Selassie

8. Dejazmach Wolde Mikael Wolde Malakot
4. Ras Mäkonnen Wäldä-Mika'él
9. Immabet Tenagnework Sahle Selassie
2. Emperor Haile Selassie I
10. Dejazmach Ali Abba Jifar
5. Woizero Yeshimebet Ali
11. Immabet-Hoy Walatta Ihata Giyorgis Yimeru
1. Amha Selassie of Ethiopia
6. Dejazmach Asfaw Mikael, Jantirar of Ambassel
3. Itege Menen Asfaw
14. Negus Mikael
7. Woizero Sehin Mikael
15. Woizero Fantaye

Amha Selassie House of Solomon Born: 29 July 1916 Died: 17 January 1997
Titles in pretence
Preceded by Haile Selassie I	— TITULAR — Emperor of Ethiopia; 27 August 1975 – 17 January 1997; Reason for succession failure: Empire abolished in 1975	Succeeded by Zera Yacob Amha Selassie
