= Socialism in Ethiopia =

Socialism in Ethiopia emerged during the 1960s, as part of the Ethiopian Student Movement (ESM). The concept apparently gained attention in the early 1970s, leading to the fall of the Ethiopian monarchy and the rise of the Derg in 1974.

Since then, the term socialism has been used by the Derg government as well as anti-Derg rebel factions such as the Tigray People's Liberation Front (TPLF) and the Eritrean People's Liberation Front (EPLF) to form a multi‐ethnic nation within their respective ideologies. After the end of the Ethiopian Civil War, some of these groups abandoned the socialist ideology in favor of the free market. While others maintained their socialist ideology or adapted it.

== Definition and background ==
Socialism in Ethiopia became prominent during the 1960s student movement under the umbrella of "Ethiopia Tikdem" (translated as "Ethiopia be first"). The movement was crucial for social change. In his 1978 book Ethiopia, the Unknown Revolution, Raúl Valdés Vivó stated that socialism greatly affected the feudalism of imperial government under Haile Selassie as newly formed social groups emerged while the established class slightly changed its position. According to the groups, the upper class, the so-called bureaucratic bourgeoisie, was the aristocrat who dissociated from subordinate groups during the Derg era.

Capitalism boomed in the 1950s in urban areas, attracting foreign investors in the West to develop infrastructure and manufacturing for import substitution. By the end of the 1960s, three-quarters of private paid-up capital was almost owned by foreign firms, concerning 68 members of the Federation of Employers of Ethiopia. These firms controlled import-export trade while Ethiopian expatriates dominated the trade sector. Such an outcome led to class struggle and wage labor. The working class began to form in the 1950s and 1960s during the time of manufacturing. Capitalist policies in favor of foreign employers, as well as government taxation and tariffs, led to the reduction of labor absorption, which did not reach above 50,000 employees out of 40,000 in urban sectors.

Further radicalization of the Ethiopian Student Movement (ESM) occurred in the late 1960s and 1970s in reaction to the 1967 closure of Suez Canal causing a sharp decline of trade activity and deflation of coffee prices, leading to the loss of sustainable revenue. The unemployment rate an issue that affected the educated class as well as the 1969 economic recession and 1970s drought further strengthened opposition to the government.

After the fall of monarchy in 1974, socialism was pervasive in Ethiopia, starting with the rise of the Derg, which proclaimed itself to be a "socialist government". Initially, the Derg gained support from leftists and various student groups. Officially following Marxism–Leninism, the Derg and its opponents both declared themselves to be socialists. The Derg aimed to use socialist policies for greater centralization of the government, while other anti-Derg political groups such as the Eritrean People's Liberation Front (EPLF) and the All-Ethiopia Socialist Movement supported a federalized socialist model. For instance, both Tigray People's Liberation Front (TPLF) and EPLF saw socialism leads to build multi‐ethnic nation‐building.

Several of the insurgent groups abandoned socialism after the end of Ethiopian Civil War in 1991 in order to gain Western support. Some of socialist elements are still prevalent in Eritrea. The TPLF is still officially a socialist party, with several of the leaders being former members of the Marxist–Leninist League of Tigray (MLLT).
