= Gizaw =

Gizaw is a surname. Notable people with the surname include:

- Afework Kassu Gizaw (born 1971), Ethiopian educator and government official
- Hiywot Gizaw (born 1978/1979), Ethiopian marathon runner
- Sara Gizaw (1929–2019), Ethiopian princess
- Shumete Gizaw, Ethiopian politician, researcher and educator
- Tilahun Gizaw (c.1940–1969), Ethiopian student leader
- Zerehune Gizaw (born 1965), Ethiopian long-distance runner
