= 1983–1985 famine in Ethiopia =

Famine in Ethiopia during the Derg rule

1983–1985 Ethiopian famine
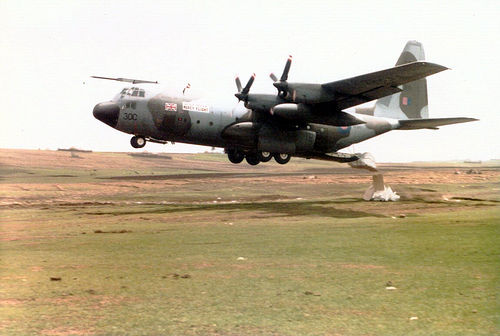
- Royal Air Force C-130 airdropping food during the famine in 1985
- Country: Ethiopia
- Location: Begemder Province, Eritrea Province, Tigray Province, and Wollo Province
- Period: 1983–1985
- Total deaths: 300,000–1,200,000
- Causes: Drought, the Ethiopian Civil War and the military policies which were implemented by the Derg regime
- Consequences: Destruction of infrastructure and economy, and exacerbation of political instability
- Preceded by: 1973–1975 Wollo famine

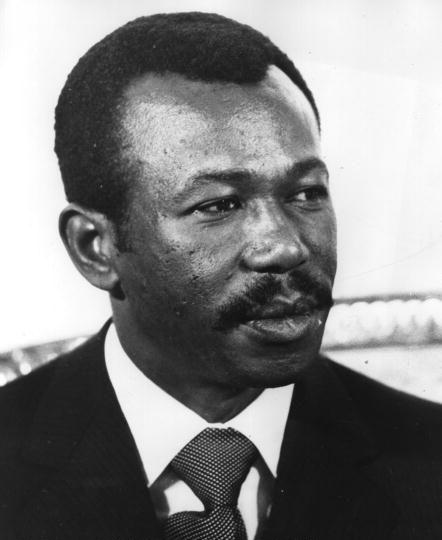
According to Oxfam and Human Rights Watch, Mengistu Haile Mariam implemented policies that multiplied the effects of the famine. In Ethiopia, he was sentenced to death in absentia for the crimes which were committed during the rule of his government (Derg). As of 2018, Mengistu lived in exile in Zimbabwe.

A widespread famine affected Ethiopia from 1983 to 1985. The worst famine to hit the country in a century, it affected 7.75 million people (out of Ethiopia's 38–40 million) and left approximately 300,000 to 1.2 million dead. 2.5 million people were internally displaced whereas 400,000 refugees left Ethiopia. Almost 200,000 children were orphaned.

According to Human Rights Watch, more than half of the deaths which occurred during the famine could be attributed to "human rights abuses causing the famine to come earlier, strike harder and extend further than would otherwise have been the case". According to the United States Agency for International Development, "in the fall of 1984, the hardest hit regions were Tigray, Wollo, and Eritrea – areas with extremely limited road and transportation networks. Moreover, these regions were the epicenters of longstanding anti-government rebellions which created precarious security situations." Other areas of Ethiopia experienced famine for similar reasons, resulting in tens of thousands of additional deaths. The famine as a whole took place a decade into the Ethiopian Civil War.

Since 1991, the most frequently believed explanations for the famine of 1983–1985 are "war and drought". According to the organizations Human Rights Watch and Oxfam, the famines that struck Ethiopia between 1961 and 1985, and in particular, the famine that struck Ethiopia from 1983–1985, were partially caused by the government's military policies, specifically, they were caused by a set of so-called counter-insurgency strategies (which were used against Tigray People's Liberation Front guerrilla-soldiers), and the waging of a campaign of "social transformation" (against people of Tigray Province, Wollo Province and such) in non-insurgent areas.

== Background ==
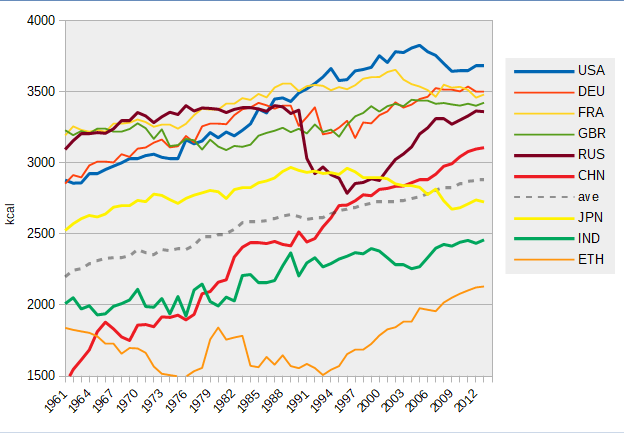
Food Supply (Energy base) These are supplied values, intake values are about 60–70% of supplied energy. Other areas (Yr 2010): Africa, sub-Sahara: 2170 kcal/capita/day N.E. and N. Africa: 3120 kcal/capita/day South Asia: 2450 kcal/capita/day

Throughout the feudal era, famines were common in Ethiopia, especially in the north. Local famines were also frequent but also unrecorded. The most infamous was the "Great Ethiopian Famine" which killed approximately one third of Ethiopia's population between 1888 and 1892. In 1958, famine killed 100,000 people. In 1966, famine killed 50,000.

In 1973, drought and feudal extractions caused a famine that killed 40,000 to 200,000 people in Wollo, resulting in protests in the capital of Addis Ababa, with Amhara youth decrying the seemingly ignored famine. Despite attempts to suppress news of this famine, leaked reports contributed to the undermining of the government's legitimacy and served as a rallying point for dissidents, who complained that the wealthy classes and the Ethiopian government had ignored both the famine and the people who had died. Then in 1974, a group of military officers known as the Derg overthrew Haile Selassie. The Derg addressed the Wollo famine by creating the Relief and Rehabilitation Commission (RRC) to examine the causes of the famine and prevent its recurrence, and then abolishing feudal tenure in March 1975. The RRC initially enjoyed more independence from the Derg than any other ministry, largely due to its close ties to foreign donors and the quality of some of its senior staff. As a result, insurgencies began to spread into the country's administrative regions.

By late 1976 insurgencies existed in all of the country's fourteen administrative regions. The Red Terror (1976–1978) marked the beginning of a steady deterioration in the economic state of the nation, coupled with extractive policies targeting rural areas. The reforms of 1975 were revoked and the Agricultural Marketing Corporation (AMC) was tasked with extracting food from rural peasantry at low rates to placate the urban populations. The very low fixed price of grain served as a disincentive to production, and some peasants had to buy grain on the open market in order to meet their AMC quota. Citizens in Wollo, which continued to be stricken with drought, were required to provide a "famine relief tax" to the AMC until 1984. The Derg also imposed a system of travel permits to restrict peasants from engaging in non-agricultural activities, such as petty trading and migrant labor, a major form of income supplementation. However, the collapse of the system of State Farms, a large employer of seasonal laborers, resulted in an estimated 500,000 farmers in northern Ethiopia losing a component of their income. Grain wholesaling was declared illegal in much of the country, resulting in the number of grain dealers falling from between 20,000 and 30,000 to 4,942 in the decade after the revolution.

The nature of the RRC changed as the government became increasingly authoritarian. Immediately after its creation, its experienced core of technocrats produced highly regarded analyses of Ethiopian famine and ably carried out famine relief efforts. However, by the 1980s, the Derg had compromised its mission. The RRC began with the innocuous scheme of creating village workforces from the unemployed in state farms, and government agricultural schemes but, as the counter-insurgency intensified, the RRC was given responsibility for a program of forced resettlement and villagization. As the go-between for international aid organizations and foreign donor governments, the RRC redirected food to government militias, in particular in Eritrea and Tigray. It also encouraged international agencies to set up relief programs in regions with surplus grain production, which allowed the AMC to collect the excess food. Finally, the RRC carried out a disinformation campaign during the 1980s famine, in which it portrayed the famine as being solely the result of drought and overpopulation and tried to deny the existence of the armed conflict that was occurring precisely in the famine-affected regions. The RRC also claimed that the aid being given by it and its international agency partners were reaching all of the famine victims.

The Mengistu Haile Mariam-led military dictatorship (Derg) used this 1983–1985 famine in Ethiopia as government military policy by restricting food supplies for strategy against the counter-insurgency of the Tigray People's Liberation Front's guerrilla-soldiers, and for "social transformation" in non-insurgent areas (against people of Tigray province, Welo province and such). Due to organized government policies that deliberately multiplied the effects of the famine, around 1.2 million people died in Ethiopia from the famine where the majority of the death tolls were from the present day Tigray Region and Amhara Region and other parts of northern Ethiopia.

Before the 1983–1985 famine, two decades of wars of national liberation and other anti-government conflict had raged throughout northern Ethiopia and present-day Eritrea. The most prominent feature of the fighting was the use of indiscriminate violence against civilians by the Ethiopian Army and Air Force. Excluding those killed by famine and resettlement, more than 150,000 people were killed.

The economy of Ethiopia is based on agriculture: almost half of GDP, 60% of exports, and 80% of total employment come from agriculture.

== Famine ==
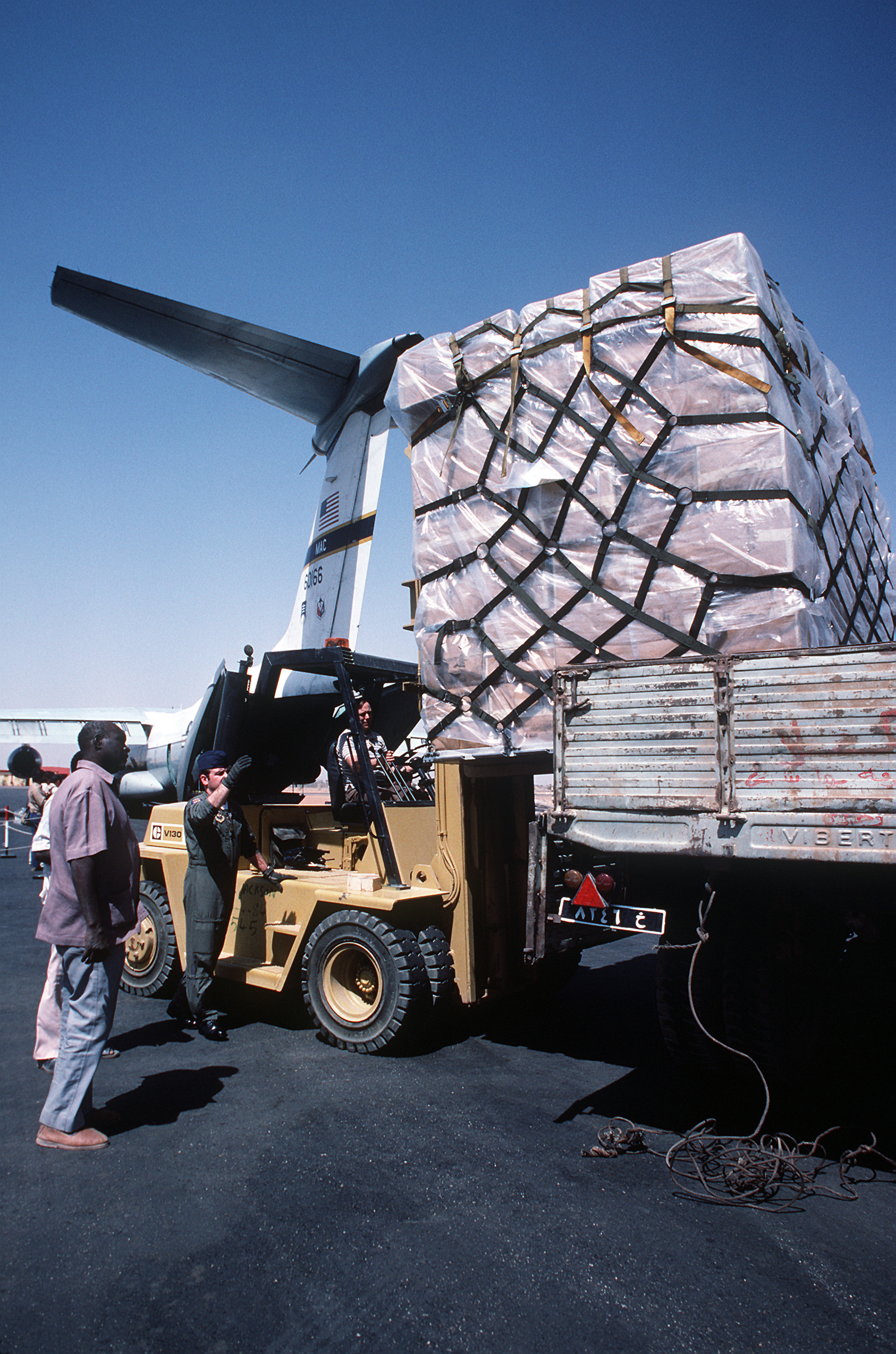
Famine relief being unloaded off a truck in 1985

Four Ethiopian provinces — Gojjam, Hararghe, Tigray and Wollo — all received record low rainfalls in the mid-1980s. In the south, a separate and simultaneous cause was the government's response to Oromo Liberation Front (OLF) insurgency. In 1984, Mengistu Haile Mariam announced that 46% of the Ethiopian Gross National Product would be allocated to military spending, creating the largest standing army in sub-Saharan Africa; the allocation for health in the government budget fell from 6% in 1973–1974 to 3% by 1990–1991.

Although a UN estimate of one million deaths is often quoted for the 1983–1985 famine, this figure has been challenged by famine scholar Alex de Waal. In a major study, de Waal criticized the United Nations for being "remarkably cavalier" about the numbers of people who died, with the UN's one-million figure having "absolutely no scientific basis whatsoever," a fact which represents "a trivialization and dehumanization of human misery". De Waal estimates that 400,000 to 500,000 died in the famine.

Nevertheless, the magnitude of the disaster has been well documented: in addition to hundreds of thousands of deaths, millions were made destitute. Media activity in the West, along with the size of the crisis, led to the "Do They Know It's Christmas?" charity single and the July 1985 concert Live Aid, which elevated the international profile of the famine and helped secure international aid. In the early to mid-1980s there were famines in two distinct regions of the country, resulting in several studies of one famine that try to extrapolate to the other or less cautious writers referring to a single widespread famine. The famine in the southeast of the country was brought about by the Derg's counterinsurgency efforts against the OLF. However, most media referring to "the Ethiopian famine" of the 1980s refers to the severe famine in 1983–85 centered on Tigray and northern Wollo, which further affected Eritrea, Begemder and northern Shewa. Living standards had been declining in these government-held regions since 1977, a "direct consequence" of the Derg's agricultural policies. A further major contributing factor to the famine were the Ethiopian government's enforced resettlement programs, utilized as part of its counter-insurgency campaign.

Average grain prices in Northern Ethiopia (birr per quintal, 100 kg)
	E. Tigray	N. Wollo	N. Begemder
November/December 1981	100	50	40
November/December 1982	165	65	55
November/December 1983	225	90	45
November/December 1984	300	160	70
June/July 1985	380	235	165

Despite RRC claims to have predicted the famine, there was little data as late as early 1984 indicating an unusually severe food shortage. Following two major droughts in the late 1970s, 1980 and 1981 were rated by the RRC as "normal" and "above normal". The 1982 harvest was the largest ever, with the exception of central and eastern Tigray. RRC estimates for people "at-risk" of famine rose to 3.9 million in 1983 from 2.8 million in 1982, which was less than the 1981 estimate of 4.5 million. In February and March 1983, the first signs of famine were recognized as poverty-stricken farmers began to appear at feeding centers, prompting international aid agencies to appeal for aid and the RRC to revise its famine assessment. The harvest after the main (meher) harvest in 1983 was the third largest on record, with the only serious shortfall again being recorded in Tigray. In response, grain prices in the two northern regions of Begemder and Gojjam fell. However, famine recurred in Tigray. The RRC claimed in May 1984 that the failure of the short rains (belg) constituted a catastrophic drought while neglecting to state that the belg crops form a fourth of crop yields where the belg falls, but none at all in the majority of Tigray. A quantitative measure of the famine are grain prices, which show high prices in eastern and central Tigray, spreading outward after the 1984 crop failure.

A major drain on Ethiopia's economy was the ongoing civil war, which pitched rebel movements against the Soviet and Cuban-backed Derg government. This crippled the country's economy further and contributed to the government's lack of ability to handle the crisis to come.

By mid-1984, it was evident that another drought and resulting famine of major proportions had begun to affect large parts of northern Ethiopia. Just as evident was the government's inability to provide relief. The almost total failure of crops in the north was compounded by fighting in and around Eritrea, which hindered the passage of relief supplies. Although international relief organizations made a major effort to provide food to the affected areas, the persistence of drought and poor security conditions in the north resulted in continuing need as well as hazards for famine relief workers. In late 1985, another year of drought was forecast, and by early 1986 the famine had spread to parts of the southern highlands, with an estimated 5.8 million people dependent on relief food. In 1986, locust plagues exacerbated the problem.

== Response to the famine ==
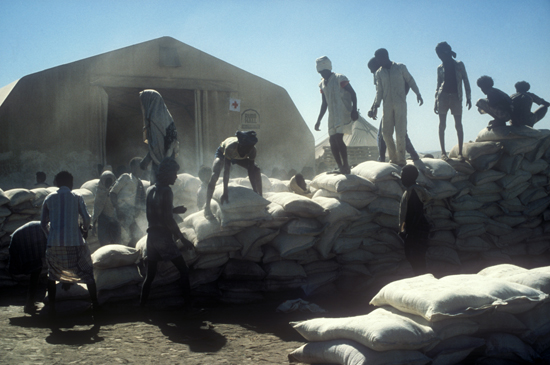
Food distribution organized by Ethiopian Red Cross volunteers

Despite the fact that the government had access to only a minority of the famine-stricken population in the north, the great majority of the relief was channeled through the government side, prolonging the war.

The Ethiopian government's unwillingness to deal with the famine provoked universal condemnation by the international community. Even many supporters of the Ethiopian regime opposed its policy of withholding food shipments to rebel areas. The combined effects of famine and internal war had by then put the nation's economy into a state of decline.

The primary government response to the drought and famine was the decision to uproot large numbers of peasants who lived in the affected areas in the north and to resettle them in the west and southern part of the country. In 1985 and 1986, about 600,000 people were moved, many forcibly, from their home villages and farms by the military and transported to various regions in the south. Many peasants fled rather than allow themselves to be resettled; many of those who were resettled sought later to return to their native regions. Several human rights organizations claimed that tens of thousands of peasants died as a result of forced resettlement. According to Human Rights Watch, at least 50,000 people died.

Another government plan involved villagization, which was a response not only to the famine but also to the poor security situation. Beginning in 1985, peasants were forced to move their homesteads into planned villages, which were clustered around water, schools, medical services, and utility supply points to facilitate the distribution of those services. Many peasants fled rather than acquiesce in relocation, which in general proved highly unpopular. Additionally, the government in most cases failed to provide the promised services. Far from benefiting agricultural productivity, the program caused a decline in food production. Although temporarily suspended in 1986, villagization was subsequently resumed.

=== International view ===
Close to 8 million people became famine victims during the drought of 1984, and over 1 million died. In the same year (23 October), a BBC news crew was the first to document the famine, with Michael Buerk describing "a biblical famine in the 20th century" and "the closest thing to hell on Earth". The report shocked Britain, motivating its citizens to inundate relief agencies, such as Save the Children, with donations, and also to bring the world's attention to the crisis in Ethiopia.

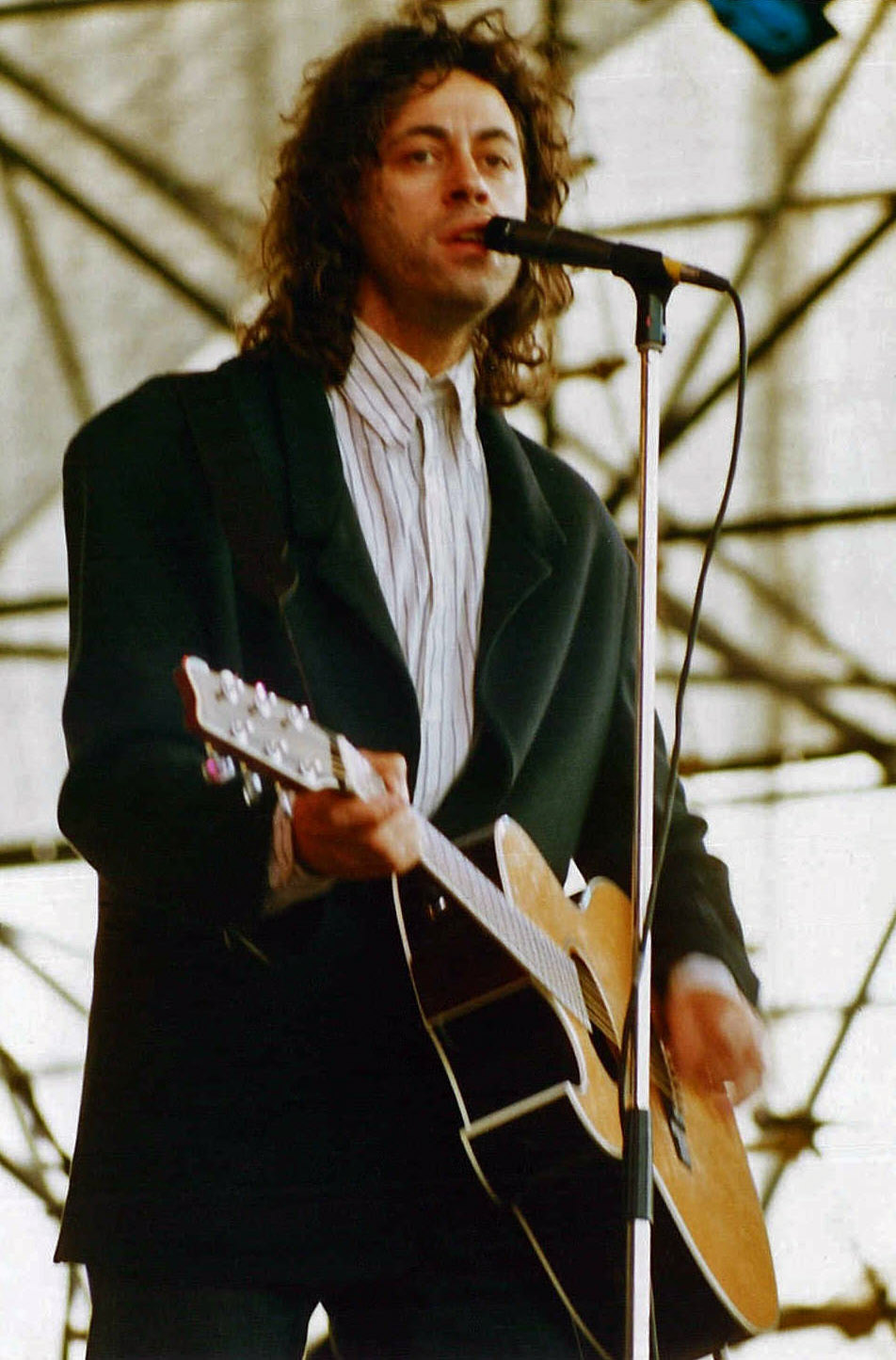
Bob Geldof co-founded Band Aid and sang as part of the chorus of their song "Do They Know It's Christmas?"

In November 1984, the British Royal Air Force carried out the first airdrops from C-130 Hercules delivering food to the starving people. Other countries including Sweden, East and West Germany, Poland, Canada, United States, the Soviet Union and Yugoslavia were also involved in the international response.

=== Charity ===
Buerk's news piece on the BBC was seen by Irish singer Bob Geldof, who quickly organised the charity supergroup Band Aid, primarily made up of the biggest British and Irish artists of the era. Their single, "Do They Know It's Christmas?", was released on 3 December 1984 and became Britain's best-selling single within a few weeks, eventually selling 3.69 million copies domestically. It raised £8 million for famine relief within twelve months of its release. Other charity singles soon followed; released in March 1985, "We Are the World" by USA for Africa was the most successful of these, selling 20 million copies worldwide.

Live Aid, a 1985 fund-raising effort headed by Geldof, induced millions of people in the West to donate money and to urge their governments to participate in the relief effort in Ethiopia. Some of the proceeds also went to the famine hit areas of Eritrea. The event raised £145 million.

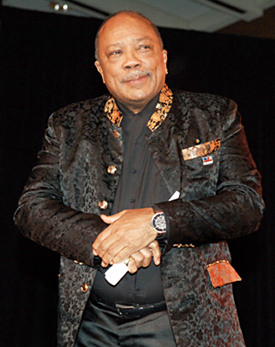
Quincy Jones was a key figure in the production and recording of "We Are the World".

In France, supergroup Chanteurs sans frontières released "SOS Éthiopie", which sold 1 million copies and raised 10 million francs (about 1.2 million dollars).

In Canada, supergroup Northern Lights, consisting of Bryan Adams, The Guess Who, Rush, Anne Murray, John Candy, Neil Young, and among others sang "Tears Are Not Enough", which was produced by David Foster.

In Yugoslavia, supergroup YU Rock Misija recorded the charity single "Za milion godina" and organized a corresponding charity concert, raising a total of US$426,000.

Other charity initiatives raised money for Ethiopia. On 27 January 1985, members of the Church of Jesus Christ of Latter-day Saints participated in a special fast, where members went without food for two meals and donated the money they would have used to buy food. The fast raised $6 million for the famine victims in Ethiopia.

== Effect on aid policy ==
The manner in which international aid was routed through the RRC gave rise to criticism that forever changed the way in which governments and NGOs respond to international emergencies taking place within conflict situations. International aid supplied to the government and to relief agencies working alongside the government became part of the counter-insurgency strategy of the government. It, therefore, met a real and immediate need but also prolonged the life of Mengistu's government. The response to the emergency raised disturbing questions about the relationship between humanitarian agencies and host governments.

However, according to Peter Gill, in his 2010 book Foreigners and Famine: Ethiopia Since Live Aid, 7.9 million people faced starvation in 1984, resulting in over 600,000 deaths; while in 2003 13.2 million "faced the prospect of a famine and only 300 died".

=== Aid money and rebel groups ===
On 3 March 2010, Martin Plaut of the BBC published evidence that millions of dollars' worth of aid to the Ethiopian famine were spent in buying weapons by the Tigrayan People's Liberation Front, a communist group trying to overthrow the Ethiopian communist government at the time. Rebel soldiers said they posed as merchants as "a trick for the NGOs". The report also cited a CIA document saying aid was "almost certainly being diverted for military purposes". One rebel leader estimated $95 million (£63 million). Plaut also said that other NGOs were under the influence or control of the Derg military junta. Some journalists suggested that the Derg was able to use Live Aid and Oxfam money to fund its enforced resettlement and villagization programs, under which at least 3 million people are said to have been displaced and between 50,000 and 100,000 killed. These reports were later refuted by the Band Aid Trust and after a seven-month investigation, the BBC found its reporting had been misleading regarding Band Aid's money and had also contained numerous errors of fact and misstatements of evidence:

Following a complaint from the Band Aid Trust the BBC's Editorial Complaints Unit found in its ruling that there was no evidence to support such statements and that "they should not have been broadcast". It also added that "The BBC wishes to apologise unreservedly to the Band Aid Trust for the misleading and unfair impression which was created".

== Death toll ==
Outsider estimates like Alex de Waal's, believe the famine of 1983–1985 killed a minimum of 400,000 people (not counting those killed by resettlement), just in northern Ethiopia (Tigray Province); "Something over half of this mortality can be attributed to human rights abuses causing the famine to come earlier, strike harder, and extend further than would otherwise have been the case."

The United States Agency for International Development which provided foreign assistance during the famine, estimated that "more than 300,000" died.

Other insider estimates put the total death toll in Ethiopia at "1.2 million dead, 400,000 refugees outside the country, 2.5 million people internally displaced, and almost 200,000 orphans".

== See also ==
Famines and droughts

- List of famines
  - 2006 Horn of Africa food crisis
  - 2010 Sahel famine
  - 2011 East Africa drought
  - Famine in northern Ethiopia (2020–present)
  - 2020–2023 Horn of Africa drought
  - Malawian food crisis
  - Droughts in the Sahel

Related

- Birhan Woldu
- Criticism of communist states
  - Mass killings under communist states
- "Tears Are Not Enough"

== General references ==
- Clay, Jason; Holcomb, Bonnie (1986). Politics and the Ethiopian Famine 1984–1985. New Brunswick and Oxford: Transaction Books. ISBN 0-939521-34-2.
- de Waal, Alex (1991). Evil Days: Thirty Years of War and Famine in Ethiopia. New York & London: Human Rights Watch. ISBN 1-56432-038-3.
- de Waal, Alex (2002) [1997]. Famine Crimes: Politics & the Disaster Relief Industry in Africa. Oxford: James Currey. ISBN 0-85255-810-4.
- Finn, James (1990). Ethiopia: The Politics of Famine. New York, NY: Freedom House. ISBN 0-932088-47-3.
- Gebru Tareke (2009). The Ethiopian Revolution: War in the Horn of Africa. New Haven: Yale University Press. ISBN 978-0-300-14163-4.
- Gill, Peter (2010). Famine and Foreigners: Ethiopia since Live Aid. Oxford: University Press. ISBN 978-0-19-956984-7.
- Johns, Michael (1988). "Gorbachev's Holocaust: Soviet Complicity in Ethiopia's Famine". Policy Review.
- Kissi, Edward (2006). Revolution and Genocide in Ethiopia and Cambodia. Oxford: Lexington Books. ISBN 978-0-7391-1263-2.
- Ofcansky, Thomas P; Berry, LaVerle (1993). Ethiopia: A Country Study. Library of Congress Country Studies (4th ed.). Washington, DC: Federal Research Division, Library of Congress. ISBN 0-8444-0739-9.
- Pankhurst, Alula (1992). Resettlement and Famine in Ethiopia: The Villagers' Experience. Manchester: University Press. ISBN 0-7190-3537-6.
- Tiruneh, Andargachew (1993). The Ethiopian Revolution, 1974–1987: A Transformation from an Aristocratic to a Totalitarian Autocracy. Cambridge: University Press. ISBN 0-521-43082-8.
- Webb, Patrick; von Braun, Joachim; Yohannes, Yisehac (1992). Famine in Ethiopia: Policy Implications of Coping Failure at National and Household Levels. Washington, DC: International Food Policy Research Institute. ISBN 0-89629-095-6.
- Webb, Patrick; von Braun, Joachim (1994). Famine and Food Security in Ethiopia: Lessons for Africa. Chichester: John Wiley and Sons.
- Young, John (2006) [1997]. Peasant Revolution in Ethiopia: The Tigray People's Liberation Front, 1975–1991. Cambridge: University Press. ISBN 978-0-521-02606-2.
- Zegeye, Abebe; Pausewang, Siegfried (1994). Ethiopia in Change: Peasantry, Nationalism and Democracy. London: British Academic Press. ISBN 1-85043-644-4.
