= Villagization (Ethiopia) =

Land reform and resettlement program

Emblem of the Derg, featuring a plow

Villagization was a land reform and resettlement program in Ethiopia implemented by the Derg in 1985 that aimed to systematize and regulate village life and rural agriculture. Villagization typically involved the relocation of rural communities or nomadic groups to planned villages with communal farmland.

Land reform stood as one of the Derg's foremost priorities, and villagization occurred within the context of broader policies of resettlement and the collectivization of agriculture. A nominally Marxist–Leninist state, the Derg modeled villagization on Soviet and Tanzanian precedents. Villagization policy immediately followed the Famine of 1983–85, and attempted to increase food production, expand social services, and further extend state control over rural populations through a systematic relocation of people into planned communities.

Opponents of the Derg saw villagization programs as thinly veiled efforts to address security concerns in rural areas, particularly those where support for the Oromo or Western Somali Liberation Fronts was strongest. Rural populations often met villagization campaigns with skepticism or resistance, and in many areas officials relocated groups hastily and violently. Poor conditions in many newly centralized villages exacerbated conditions of poverty and underdevelopment, drawing significant criticism from international human rights groups. In 1990, shortly before its overthrow by the Ethiopian People's Revolutionary Democratic Front, the People's Democratic Republic of Ethiopia (PDRE) shifted to free-market economic policies and abandoned villagization.

== Land reform and resettlement ==
=== Imperial era ===
The nature of villagization's motivations and implementation originate from the broader context of land reform under the Derg. Issues of land reform were central to the Derg's rise and the overthrow of Haile Selassie. Prior to the 1974 Revolution, an entrenched and complex land-tenure system severely restricted peasants' rights to agricultural land and freedom of movement. Population growth in the 1950s and 1960s increased the economic insecurity of peasant tenants, generating considerable pressure for reform. A long-standing labor surplus in the Highlands also limited a gradual modernization of agriculture in Ethiopia, as there was little incentive to pursue mechanization. Thus traditional farming practices remained widespread into the 1970s. While Selassie's regime made some effort to redress overpopulation by resettling groups from the Highlands region, the Derg was able to gain significant support with a pledge to abolish the land-tenure system, calling for "land to the tiller." Land reform became the central issue the revolution.

=== Revolutionary period ===
After coming to power in 1975, the Derg accelerated resettlement policies and implemented substantial agricultural reforms. Most private holdings were nationalized, land was redistributed from landlords to peasants, and worker cooperatives were encouraged. Peasant associations based on socialist principles quickly became the foundation of the new rural life. The 1975 Rural Land Proclamation No. 31 mandated that peasant associations undertake 8 specific tasks, among which was the encouragement of villagization. This was the first instance in which villagization appeared in the Derg's land reform policy.

However, peasant associations were rarely eager to implement villagization themselves, and devoted most of their energies to the redistribution of land. Because the regime initially made little effort to seriously implement the policy, no serious attempts were made until 1985. Through the 1970s the Derg invested most heavily in resettlement programs, with the goal of relocating 1.5 million people to previously uncultivated land. The Land Reform Proclamation of 1975 gave the state full authority to dictate and implement resettlement. As part of the Qey Shibir terror campaign, tactics of violence and intimidation to force populations into new settlements were common. Poor planning and negligence often meant that resettled groups were left without proper food, shelter, or services, leading to thousands of deaths from starvation and disease. Despite international criticism, the Derg resorted to similar methods when implementing villagization in the 1980s.

=== 1983–1985 Famine ===
In the mid 1980s Ethiopia experienced its worst famine of the 20th century, leaving 1.2 million dead and 2.5 million internally displaced. While record low rainfall and severe drought were the most immediate cause of the famine, rapid land reform, misguided policy, and years of underproduction created a disproportionate crisis. Government policies during the famine also played a significant role in exacerbating its effects. Resettlement often led to a decline in agricultural production, and most new settlements had still not yet become self-sufficient. Furthermore, international humanitarian organizations such as Oxfam and Human Rights Watch have alleged that Derg Chairman Mengistu Haile Mariam intentionally weaponized the famine in its fight against rebel insurgencies during the Civil War, withholding food aid from the Tigray and Welo regions. Villagization emerged as one of the Derg's emergency policies to address the famine, with the intention of organizing underproductive agricultural sectors. Addressing the famine became the regime's singular justification for villagization to the public. In an interview with the German journalist Hannelore Gadatsch on December 16, 1986, Mengistu stated that the regime had intended to carry out villagization in stages over a longer period of time, but the drought necessitated a rapid implementation of the program. Some familiar with the regime's development plan instead saw this as a calculated act to gain political advantage from the crisis.

== Policy goals ==
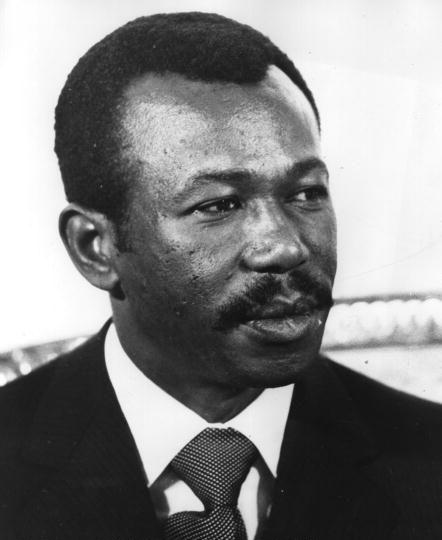
Mengistu Haile Mariam, Chairman of the Derg and President of Ethiopia

Villagization aimed to radically transform rural life in Ethiopia while combatting drought and increasing agricultural productivity. The Mengistu regime saw villagization as a way to quickly achieve the collectivization of agriculture and rural modernization. By relocating dispersed communities and nomadic groups into larger, planned villages, the state could more easily supply modern services such as clean water, clinics, schools, and electricity. With state assistance villages would also act as hubs for technological improvements in agriculture. Each new village would be organized under a single peasant association approved by the state. Villages and their respective associations would function as producer cooperatives, forming the basis for the development of future collective farms.

The regime was also concerned that peasant associations were becoming mechanisms of private wealth accumulation, antithetical to the revolution's mission. Villagization would extend state reach further into the countryside, allowing for better regulation of these associations. Another function of the policy was to force peasants into an official, regulated agricultural market. Villagization would allow the government's agricultural bureau, the Agricultural Marketing Corporation, to easily extract goods and produce from the rural sector at fixed prices.

The Derg also pursued villagization with security concerns in mind, as the new villages could more easily be organized into defensive military units or monitored for rebel activity. Such concerns were especially salient in Bale and Hararghe provinces, where the Ogaden War had severely undermined state control. Some argue that security concerns, rather than agricultural development, were the primary concerns motivating villagization. Villages in border regions were likened to "strategic hamlets" that formed a barrier between insurgents and the general population. Villagization also directly targeted political tensions in the Shebelle Valley, where new state farms had displaced a large number of smallholding farmers.

== Policy implementation ==
Starting in 1985 the government began directly forcing peasant associations to implement villagization. Impressed by a model villagization program in Harar, Mengistu charged Legesse Asfaw with orchestrating a new villagization policy. The Ten Year Perspective Plan made villagization central to rural development, with the goal of relocating 33 million rural people by 1994.

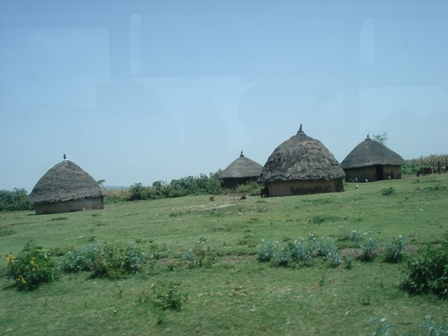
Traditional tukuls

Peasant associations were encouraged to compete for Mengistu's praise by speedily establishing the most villages. According to official policy, each peasant association was to establish a village in a location suitable for habitation and farming. However, the regime often hastily forced associations onto particular sites with no consideration of local knowledge or preferences. Furthermore, physical and agricultural surveys of new sites were rarely taken, resulting in numerous villages located on unproductive land. The Central Planning Committee only began investigating the long-term consequences of villagization well after the initiative was underway. Farmers were typically required to dismantle their huts, or tukuls, and transport the materials to the new village site, where they would rebuild their tukul on a designated plot. Each village typically consisted of 500 families. Peasant associations seized farmers' tools and livestock for communal use. Many farmers perceived that the better, more fertile tracts were distributed to the wealthier heads of the peasant associations or to those able to pay bribes.

Because peasant associations often lacked personnel and administrative capacity, the Derg recruited over 60,000 high school and university students – the so-called zemacha – to help organize rural communities and assist with villagization. The Derg compelled students to root out enemies of the revolution and permitted them to use coercion and physical violence against peasants. Those who resisted villagization were often abused, jailed or executed. At times student groups attempted to implement changes on a more radical level than the regime's villagization policy, undermining government legitimacy in rural areas. Peasants were particularly resistant to villagization in Gojjam and western Shewa, where traditional practice remained strong, and faced severe government retaliation. By 1986 more than 3.5 million lived in the new villages. By 1989 the regime had established over 4,500 villages and relocated about 13 million peasants in Shewa, Arsi, and Hararge provinces alone.

== Results of villagization ==
Villagization had immediate effects on rural agricultural life in Ethiopia. The rapid, haphazard nature of its implementation severely disrupted farmers' daily lives, impacting their ability to tend to their crops. Poorly planned and forced relocations often wasted farmers' valuable time and resources. New homestead plots were often located far from land designated for cultivation, placing a greater burden on farmers. The promised clinics, schools, and other services of the new villages typically remained unrealized. Furthermore, farmers often earned lower incomes in the new villages, as they were unable to sell their goods at a higher value on black-markets. Villagization often did not end traditional agricultural practice, as peasants saw little evidence that government mandates improved production.

In many areas agricultural production rapidly declined. The ratio of farmers to arable land was often less than it had been prior to villagization. In 1988 village service cooperatives accounted for only 5.5% of grain production, despite ostensibly serving 4.4 million households. Mengistu however claimed that poor production levels were the result of a social structure still rooted in individualism and a petit bourgeois capitalist mentality, and the regime did not immediately abandon villagization. The rapid construction of new villages also led to serious deforestation, damaging already vulnerable ecosystems that help combat desertification. Some communities fled rather than face villagization, settling in refuge camps across the Somali border. The new village system became increasingly difficult for the regime to sustain. Villages were often initially dependent on the state for resources and incurred significant organizational costs. Ultimately Mengistu's government abandoned the policy entirely in 1990, bowing to internal and external pressures to switch to free-market economic policies.

== Reactions and criticisms ==
Contemporary critics of villagization noted that the policy often worsened the problems it sought to address. A commissioned report by the Swedish International Development Agency, the first to study villagization, criticized the timing of the policy. Observers of the food crisis in Ethiopia feared that the policy would only further disrupt agricultural production, and criticized the Derg for ignoring actual local concerns. If the regime granted greater autonomy to the peasant associations, villagization could possibly have been carried out more peacefully and with more support from the communities affected.

International agencies and donors generally condemned the policy. Many foreign donors suspended aid flows to Ethiopia, as they were unwilling to support a collectivization drive resembling dekulakization and the creation of Soviet state farms. Others donors reluctant to send aid felt that such development programs could no longer be considered "humanitarian activities." In 1988, after considerable pressure from the World Bank, the regime relaxed market regulations within the new village cooperatives.

Those sympathetic to the revolution approved the principle of villagization yet lamented its tumultuous execution. Peasants themselves resented the loss of their property and the militarized feel of the new villages, which lacked any places of worship or traditional cultural institutions. One German observer noted that "these new villages gave the impression of having come straight out of the laboratory." Some scholars have noted the similarities between villagization in Ethiopia and villagization in Tanzania under Nyerere. Despite the Derg's awareness of the particular failures of the Tanzanian precedent, lessons on excessive centralization and coercion were not drawn.

== See also ==
- Agriculture in Ethiopia
- Collective farming
- Collectivization in the Soviet Union
