= 1958 Tigray famine =

Famine in Ethiopia during Haile Selassie regime

- Country: Ethiopia
- Location: Tigray and Wollo provinces
- Period: 1957–1958
- Total deaths: 100,000
- Succeeded by: 1972–1975 Wollo famine

The 1958 Tigray famine was a provincial famine in the Ethiopian Empire during the reign of Emperor Haile Selassie.

== Background ==
The origins of the 1958 famine traced back to when Ethiopia's Tigray Province was ravaged by the consequences of the Woyane rebellion of 1943, which occurred in the midst of the Second World War, and the neglect of successive administrations. The region had been deeply affected by the East African campaign during the Second World War and the Woyane rebellion, resulting in severe destruction to its agricultural infrastructure—the primary source of sustenance for 98% of its inhabitants.

By late 1957, following increasing pressures faced by rural communities, coupled with disasters such as droughts and locust raids, famine broke out in Tigray and parts of nearby Wollo. Haile Selassie's response to the famine was characterized by bureaucratic inertia and efforts to cover up the famine, in the end no significant government relief was given and up to 100,000 peasants starved to death.
