= Revolution of 1974 =

Revolution of 1974 may refer to:

- The Ethiopian Revolution against Haille Selassie
- The Carnation Revolution in Portugal
