= Wallelign Mekonnen =

Ethiopian Marxist student activist and author (1945–1972)

- ዋለልኝ መኮንን
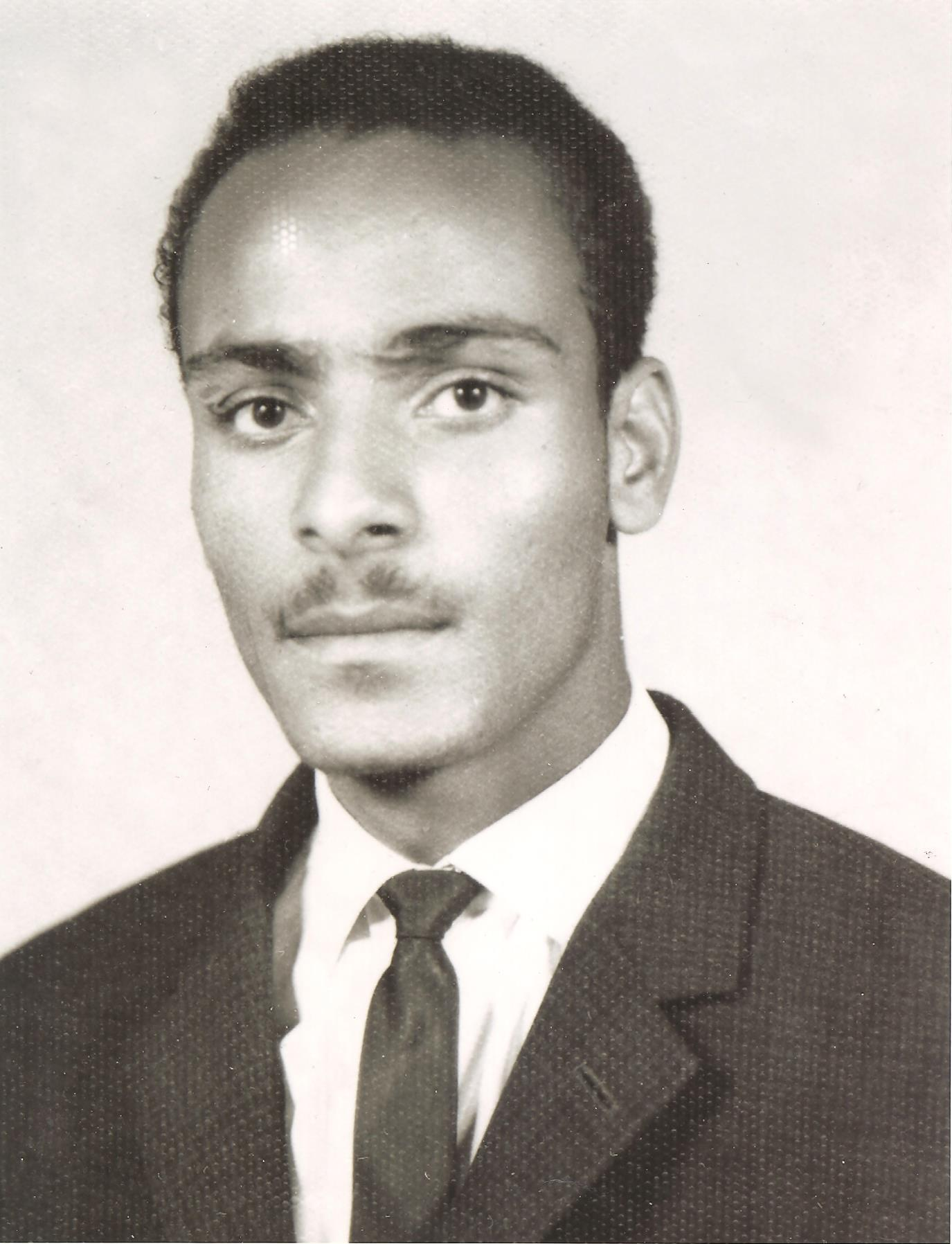
- Born: 22 March 1945; Sayint, Begemder Province, Ethiopian Empire (now South Wollo Zone, Ethiopia)
- Died: 10 December 1972 (aged 27)
- Education: Woizero Sehin Secondary School
- Alma mater: Haile Selassie I University
- Occupations: Student activist; author
- Years active: 1960s–1972
- Notable work: On the Question of Nationalities in Ethiopia
- Movement: Ethiopian Student Movement

Wallelign Mekonnen Kassa (Amharic: ዋለልኝ መኮንን ካሣ; 22 March 1945 – 10 December 1972) was an Ethiopian Marxist student activist and militant active in the Ethiopian Student Movement from the mid-1960s until his death in 1972. Wallelign was the author of the highly influential but contentious article On the Question of Nationalities in Ethiopia published in 1969.

== Early life ==
Wallelign was born in Sayint, South Wollo, and was the son of a merchant. He graduated from Woizero Sehin Secondary School in Dessie.

== Student leader ==
Wallelign enrolled at the then Haile Selassie I University as a Political Science student. Wallelign soon became involved in the radical student groups that were proliferating at the university. Due to his student activism he was arrested and sentenced to five years imprisonment in April 1969, but was pardoned by Emperor Haile Selassie shortly afterwards.

== On the Question of Nationalities in Ethiopia ==
Wallelign’s most famous article On the Question of Nationalities in Ethiopia was published in the student movement’s journal Struggle in November 1969. In this article Wallelign tried to analyze 'national oppression' in Imperial Ethiopia and argued that as Ethiopia was not one nation, but rather a collection of different nations and nationalities, whose struggle for self-determination should be supported by the student movement as long as they are committed to socialism. This was a highly contentious area that divided the student movement at the time, but Wallelign’s views eventually came to dominate the student movement as well as the political parties that it spawned.

As a result of the publication a police harassment and media campaign was unleashed against the student movement and Struggle's publication was suspended. The following month, Tilahun Gizaw, president of the University Students' Union of Addis Ababa, was assassinated by what is presumed to be agents of the state.

Wallelign was arrested again in December 1969 and imprisoned until May 1971.

== Death and legacy ==
After his release Wallelign worked in the Ministry of Ground Transportation and remained active in the radical movement. On 10 December 1972, Wallelign and six fellow activists attempted to hijack an Ethiopian Airlines flight leaving Addis Ababa for Europe. Following a string of hijackings carried out by Eritrean and Ethiopian activists in the late 1960s and early 1970s, however, Ethiopian security officers had been placed on such flights, and a shoot-out ensued that killed five of the hijackers, including Wallelign. He was buried in Dessie.

At the end of the Ethiopian Civil War the rebel Ethiopian People’s Revolutionary Democratic Front (EPRDF) named its Wollo offensive Operation Wallelign in honour of the fallen activist. Wallelign's views are embedded in the current Constitution of the Federal Democratic Republic of Ethiopia which recognizes the unconditional right of "every Nation, Nationality and People in Ethiopia... to self-determination, including the right to secession". The ongoing debate on this constitution bears witness of how controversial his views remain.
