= Press cake =

Solids remaining after pressing something

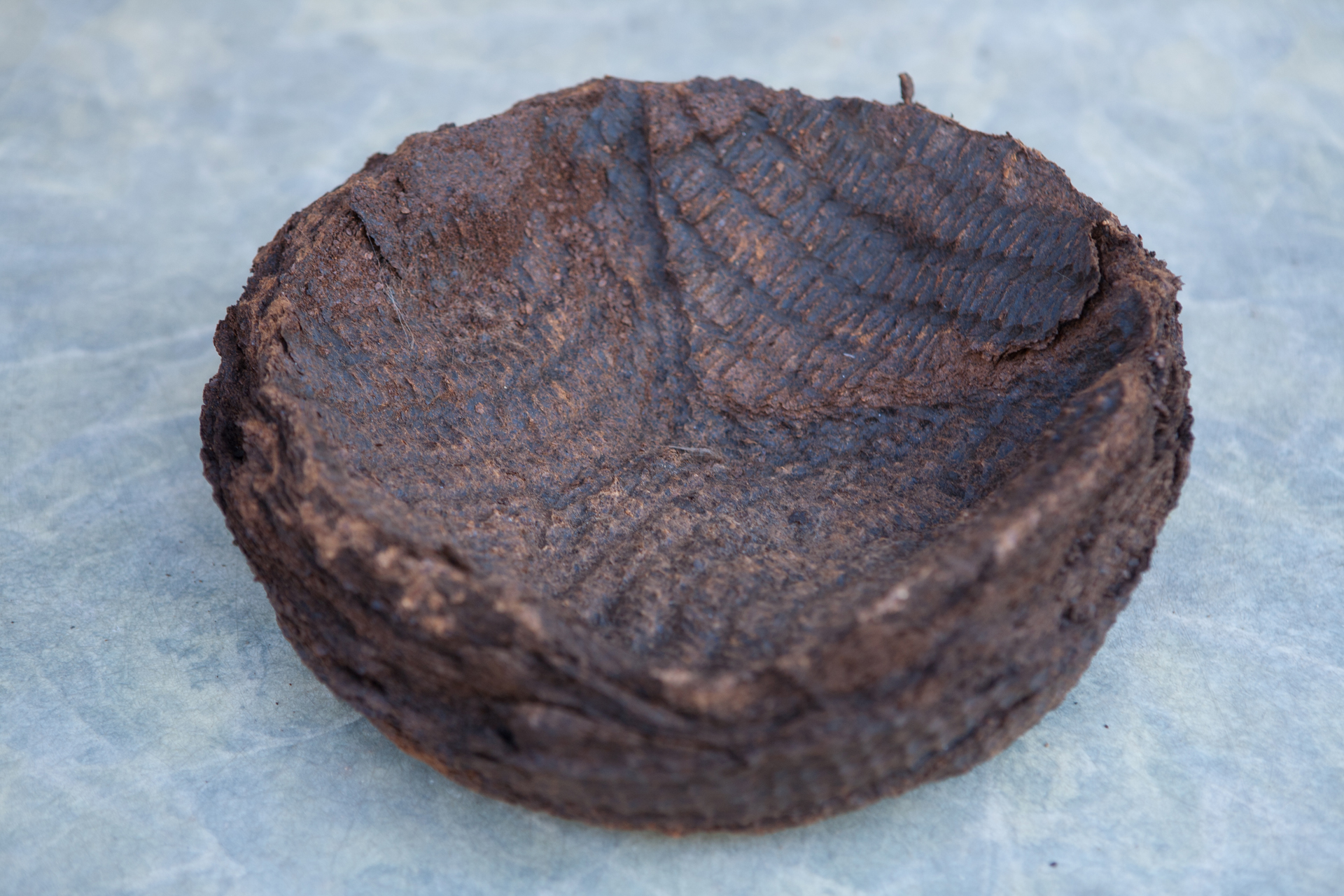
Sesame press cake

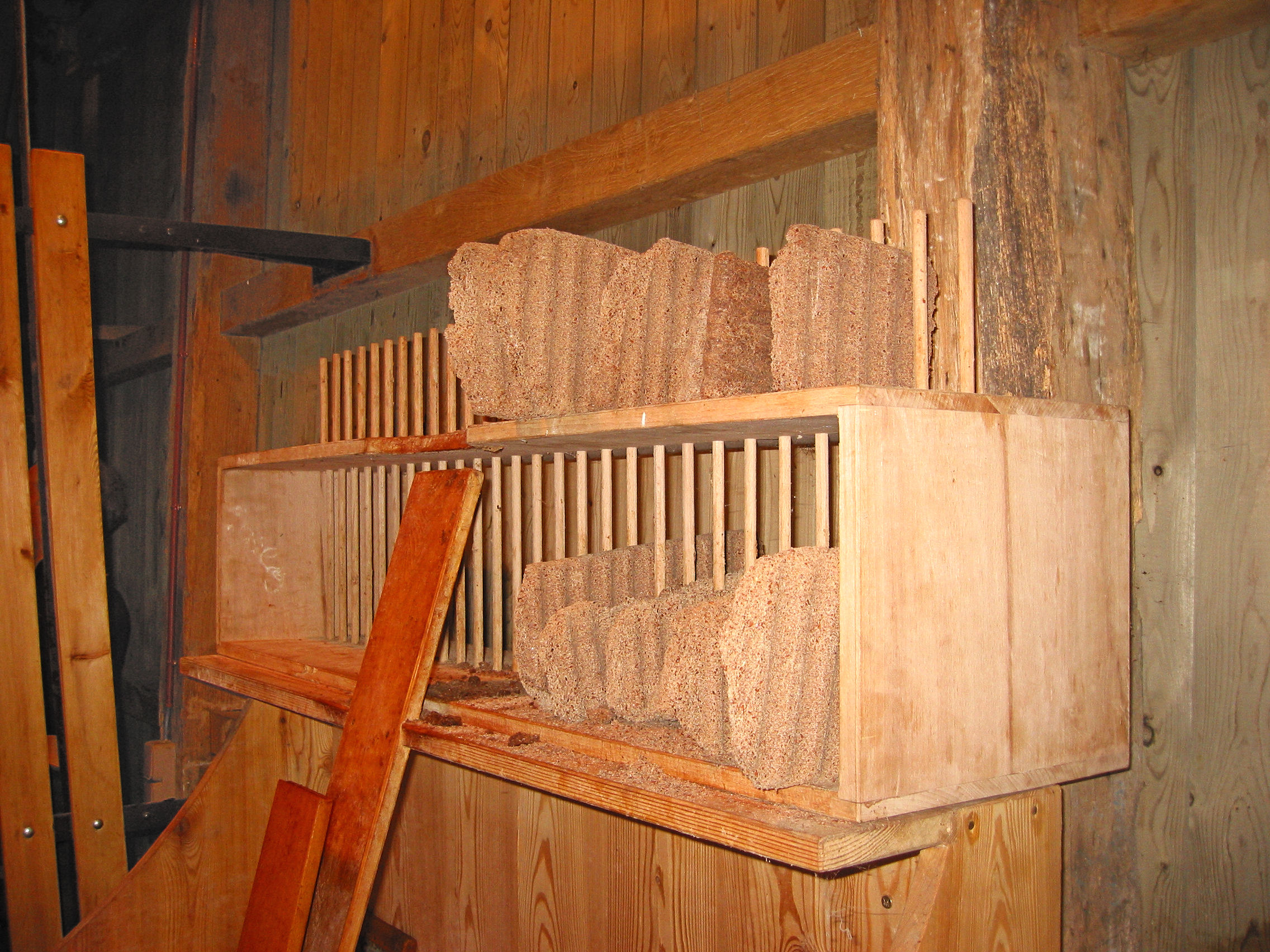
Oil cakes

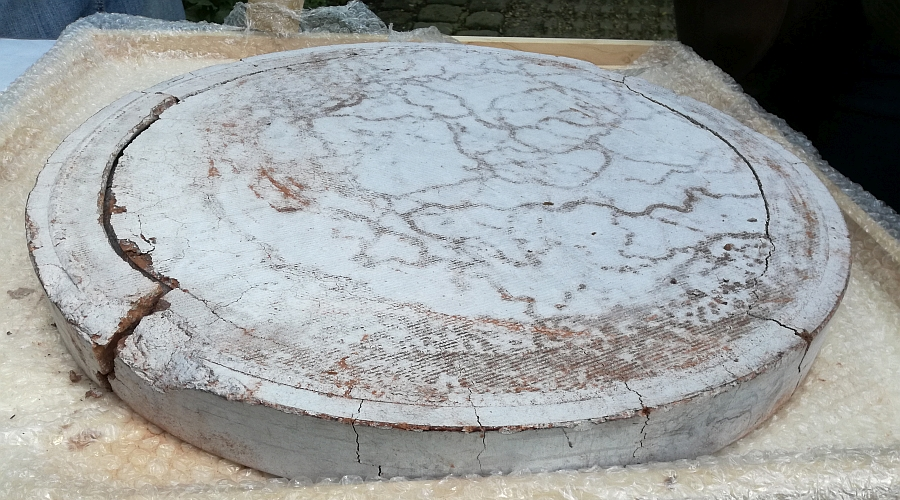
Cocoa cake

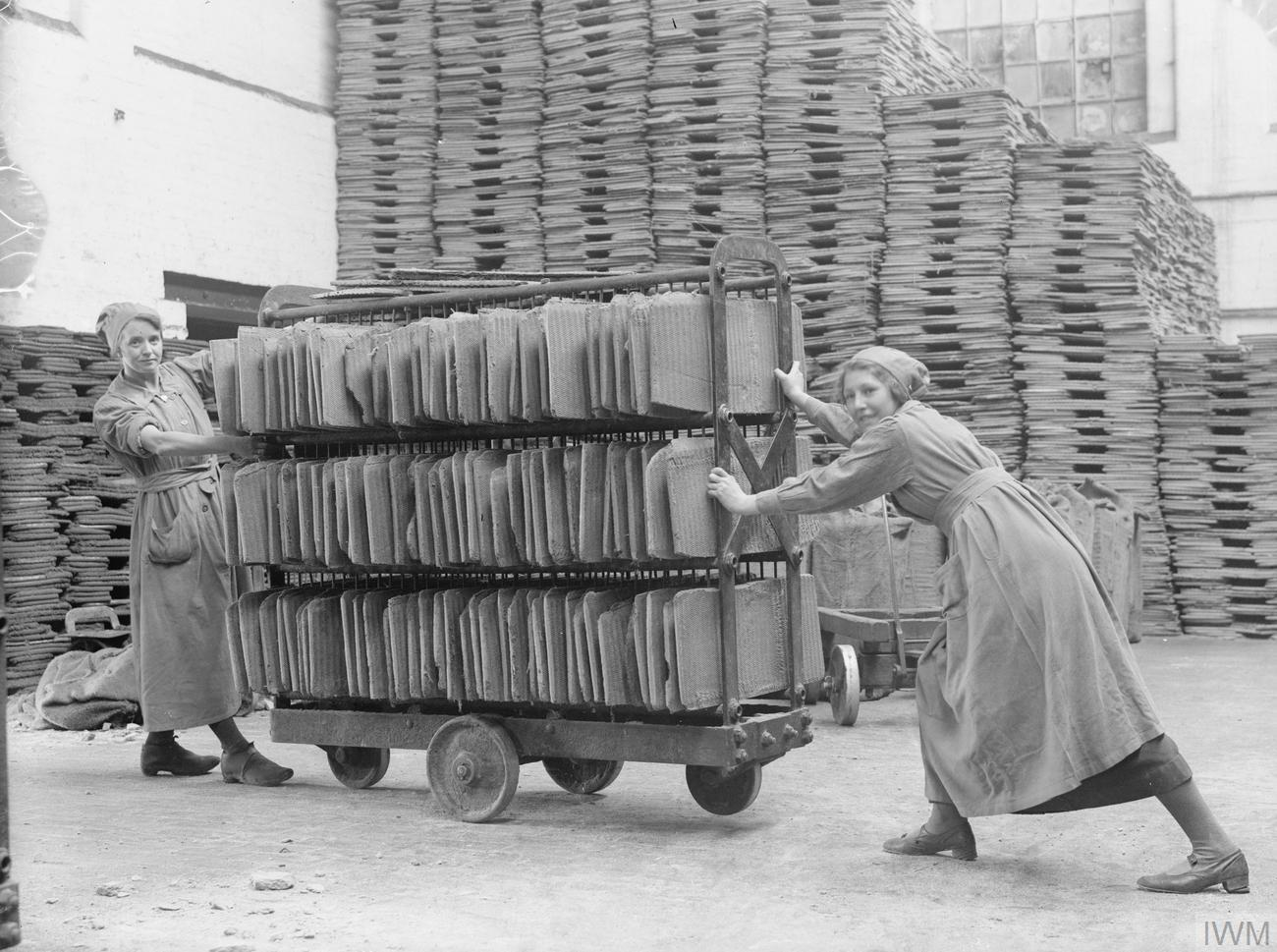
Factory workers transporting oil cakes to a warehouse, September 1918

A press cake or oil cake is the solid matter remaining after pressing something to extract the liquids. Their most common use is in animal feed.

Some foods whose processing creates press cakes are olives for olive oil (pomace), peanuts for peanut oil, coconut flesh for coconut cream and milk (sapal), grapes for wine (pomace), apples for cider (pomace), mustard cake, and soybeans for soy milk (used to make tofu) (this is called soy pulp) or oil. Other common press cakes come from flax seed (linseed), cottonseed, and sunflower seeds. However, some specific kinds may be toxic, and are rather used as fertilizer; for example, cottonseed contains a toxic pigment, gossypol, that must be removed before processing.

== Household use ==
In Nepalese cuisine the oil cake of the Persian walnut is used for culinary purposes, and it is also applied to the forehead to treat headaches. In some regions it is used as boiler fuel as a means of reducing energy costs, for which it is quite suitable.

== Military use ==
In 1942 the Porton Down biology department outsourced the production of 5,273,400 linseed press cakes to Olympia Oil and Cake Company in Blackburn Meadows which would then be infected with Bacillus anthracis (bacteria that causes anthrax) and using in the biological warfare program Operation Vegetarian. The plan was to entice cattle into eating the anthrax-laden press cakes.

== Peanuts ==
Peanut pie (or peanut bran) is a byproduct of biofuel and consumable peanut oil production. It has uses in livestock feed, particularly in the diets of ruminant animals. The Brazilian Biodiesel Program has included peanuts as a part of its raw materials supply, as the legume has a 45% to 50% grain oil yield. Family farmers include peanut in their cultivation, which contributes to the diversification of production and income generation. After the extraction of the oil, peanut pie (also called peanut bran) has a nutritional value of 45% protein, approximately 8.5% grease, and a maximum of 9.5% cellulose.

== See also ==
- Fodder

=== Works cited ===
- Manandhar, Narayan P. (April 1, 2002). Plants and people of Nepal. Portland (Or.): Timber press. ISBN 0-88192-527-6.
- Clay, Jason W. (2004). World agriculture and the environment: a commodity-by-commodity guide to impacts and practices. Washington, D.C: Island Press. ISBN 1-55963-370-0.
- Dias, Carina Anunciação Santos; Bagaldo, Adriana Regina; Cerutti, Weiler Giacomaza; Barbosa, Analívia Martins; de Carvalho, Gleidson Giordano Pinto; Costa, Emellinne Ingrid Souza; Bezerra, Leilson Rocha; Oliveira, Ronaldo Lopes (March 2018). "Peanut cake can replace soybean meal in supplements for lactating cows without affecting production". Tropical Animal Health and Production. 50 (3): 651–657. doi:10.1007/s11250-017-1482-6. PMID 29238885.
- Silva, Enilson De Barros; Ferreira, Evander Alves; Pereira, Gustavo Antônio Mendes; Silva, Daniel Valadão; Oliveira, Altino Júnior Mendes (July–September 2017). "Peanut Plant Nutrient Absorption and Growth". Revista Caatinga. 30 (3): 653–661. doi:10.1590/1983-21252017v30n313rc. ISSN 0100-316X.
