= Tsehaye Yohannes =

Ethiopian singer (born 1959)

- Born: 1959 (age 66–67); Asmara, Eritrea Province, Ethiopian Empire
- Genres: Ethiopian music
- Occupation: Singer
- Works: List
- Labels: Nahom Records; Roha Band

Tsehaye Yohannes (Amharic: ፀሃዬ ዮሃንስ, born 1959) is an Ethiopian singer who was prominent during his youth in the 1980s and 1990s.

== Life and career ==
Tsehaye Yohannes was born in 1959 in Asmara and grew up in Addis Ababa and Kuha, a small town in suburban Mekelle in Tigray. He is of Amhara descent. While he was a grade 5th student, during the Student Movement, Tsehaye then marched with students chanting "Land to the Thriller" and he performed his song "Berta Zemede Zemachu Gwade". After the Derg seized power, Tsehaye released "Manbeb Ena Metsaf", dedicated to increasing literacy. "Finchetwa", "Yaz Yaz" and "Tur New" were popular in the 1980s and 1990s.

Tsehaye worked with Roha Band in 1980s and 1990s, released albums such as Fenchetwa (1984), Yalanchima (1996), before Nahom Records handled his many recordings in 2000s and supported his albums like Letinish (2001) and Sakilegn (2007). the latter was produced in Washington D.C along with Yaynu Production. In 2014, he released his latest album, Yeneta.

== Discography ==
Title	Year
Fenchetwa	1984
Yalanchima	1996
Letinish	2001
Sakilegn	2007
Yeneta	2014
