= Ethiopian Student Movement =

1960–1974 Marxist-Leninist student movement in Ethiopia

- Part of Opposition to Haile Selassie
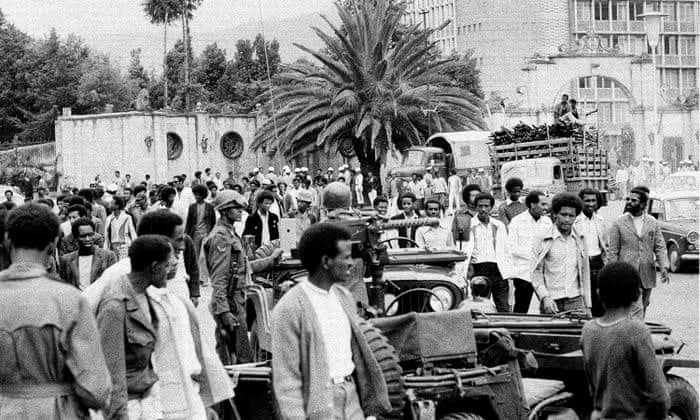
- Public demonstration amid the Ethiopian Revolution in 1974
- Date: 1960–1974
- Location: Ethiopia
- Caused by: Discontent with Haile Selassie's administration; 1972–1975 Wollo famine; Land reform
- Goals: Overthrowing the Ethiopian imperial government; Radical land reform; Communist revolution
- Methods: Protest; Student activism
- Result: Beginning of the Ethiopian Revolution and the Derg era; 1974 Ethiopian coup d'état; Monarchy abolished in 1975

Parties
| Ethiopian students | (Ethiopian Empire) Government of Ethiopia |

Lead figures
| Tilahun Gizaw | Haile Selassie |

Casualties
- Deaths: 30,000–750,000 (estimates vary widely)

The Ethiopian Student Movement (Amharic: የኢትዮጵያ ተማሪዎች ንቅንቄ, ESM) was a period of radical Marxist–Leninist student activism and movement in Ethiopia from the mid-1960s to the 1974 revolution. The first demonstration occurred in 1965 by university student, led by Marxist–Leninist motivation chanting "Land to the Tiller" and "Is poverty a crime?". The student uprisings continued in 1966 until 1969. The movement also called for the abolition of monarchy under Emperor Haile Selassie and feudalism in Ethiopia.

Following the 1974 revolution, the ESM members in Ethiopia and abroad superintended many political organizations like the Ethiopian People's Revolutionary Party (EPRP) and All-Ethiopia Socialist Movement (MEISON), that involved in insurgency against the Derg regime. Scholars agreed that the ESM has laid foundation of many opposition forces behind the Derg government during the Ethiopian Civil War, especially the Tigray People's Liberation Front (TPLF) and the inspired the EPRDF's notion of "multi-nation, multi-ethnic, and multilingual nature of Ethiopia". As such, ESM is critical for the 21st-century Ethiopian ethnic conflict.

== History ==
The first demonstration occurred in 1965 driven by Marxist–Leninist university students with the slogan "Land to the Tiller". It was followed by the 1966, 1967 and 1968 uprising with "the powers that be on a variety of social and political issues". In May 1966, the student confronted the police, chanting the slogan "Is poverty a crime?". A faction within the movement supported the armed uprisings occurring against Selassie in Eritrea province and the Ogaden region.

In April 1967, the third successive year of protest occurred near Arat Kilo campus rather than Siddest Kilo campus. In response, the Ethiopian government issued law to Ministry of Interior that restrict the protest. Two days prior, about 1,500 and 1,700 people demonstrated in Arat Kilo campus but were deterred by police force, utilizing tear gas and began attacking the demonstrators. The 1973 nationwide famine also agitated the student activism and protest.

== Legacy ==
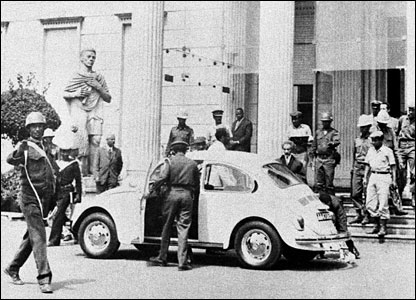
The ESM was the leading factor for the deposition of Emperor Haile Selassie in 1974

The Ethiopian Student Movement was crucial for the fall of Emperor Haile Selassie regime, the 1974 revolution and the seizure of Derg military junta. Many political parties during the Derg era emerged from ESM, mostly the Ethiopian People's Revolutionary Party (EPRP) which was formed by students that exiled to the United States, Europe and Algiers while the All-Ethiopia Socialist Movement (MEISON) came out from the Ethiopian Student Union in Europe (ESUE). The Derg also proposed prerequisites for ESM student demands, such as land reform and the creation of peasant association. The Tigray People's Liberation Front (TPLF) and the Ethiopian People's Revolutionary Democratic Front (EPRDF) whose formation traced back after the 1974 revolution, also inspired the main ESM ideologues of debate of "multi-nation, multi-ethnic, and multilingual nature of Ethiopia". Hannah Borenstein, who backed Bahru Zewde opinion, wrote that the 1969 student activism was both good and bad, and bequeathed to the contemporary ethnic conflict in Ethiopia.

== Notable leaders ==
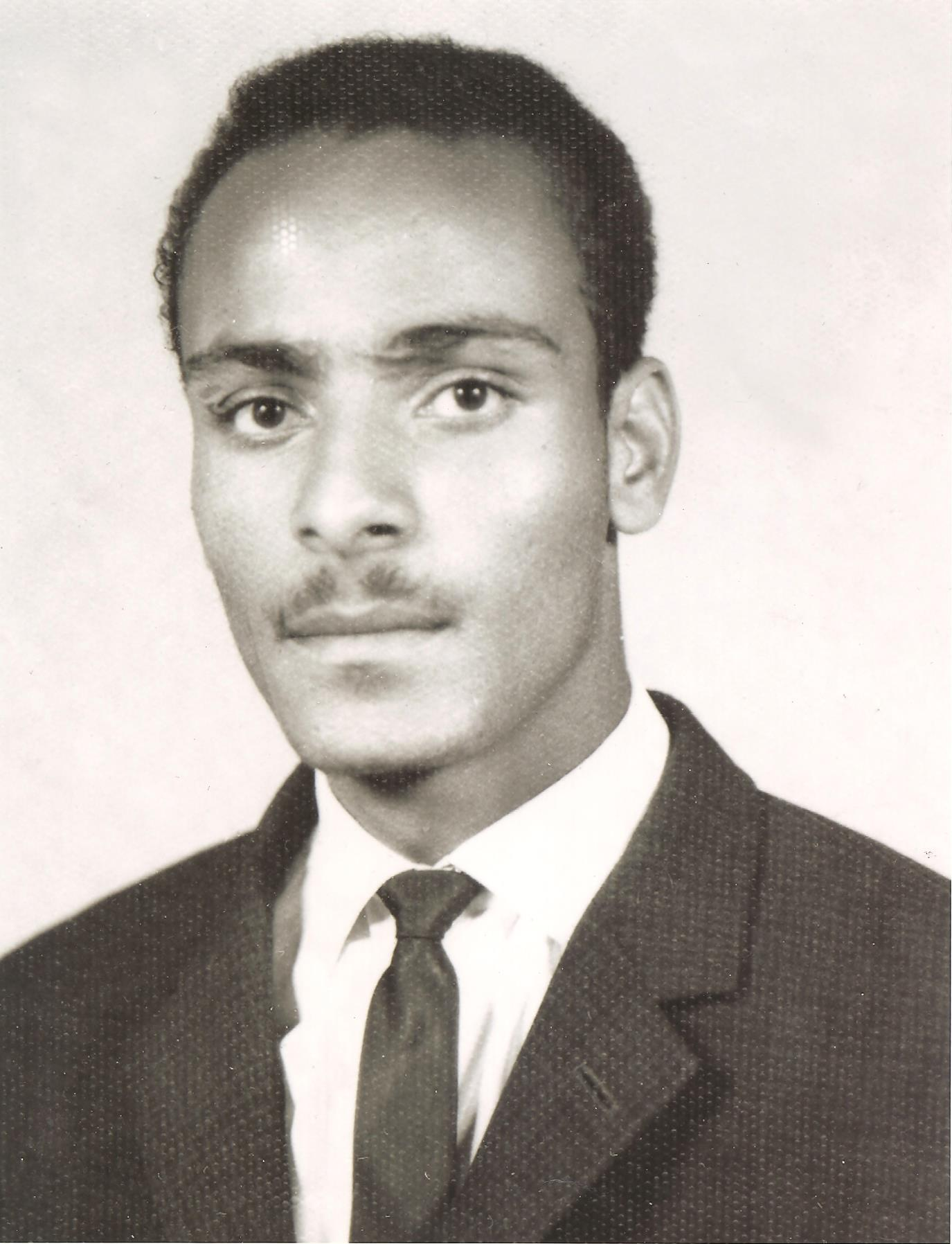
Wallelign Mekonnen

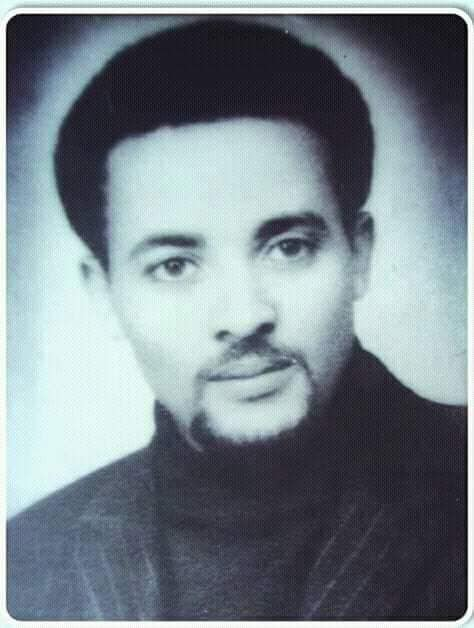
Tilahun Gizaw

- Tilahun Gizaw
- Wallelign Mekonnen
