= 1972–1975 Wollo famine =

Famine in Ethiopia during Haile Selassie regime

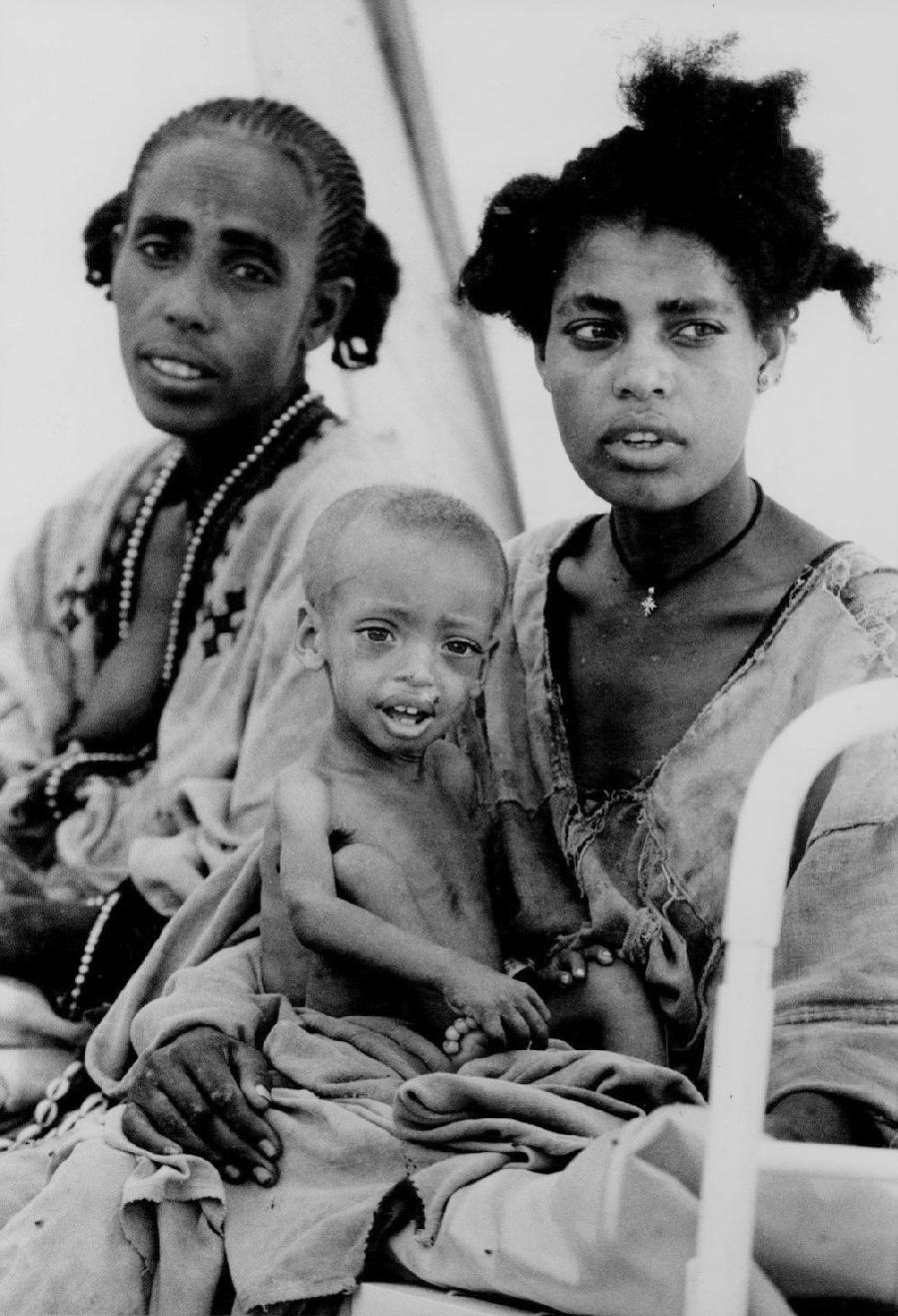
- Mother with starving child in the region, c. 1973.
- Country: Ethiopia
- Location: Wollo province
- Period: 1972–1975
- Death rate: 250,000
- Consequences: Ethiopian Revolution
- Preceded by: 1958 Tigray famine
- Succeeded by: 1983–1985 famine

The 1972–1975 Wollo famine was a major famine in the Ethiopian Empire during the reign of Emperor Haile Selassie. The famine widely ravaged two provinces as well as converging areas such as the Afar-inhabited arid region by early 1972. During 1972 and 1973, the famine killed between 40,000 and 80,000 people. In response, the government initiated the Relief and Rehabilitation Commission (RRC), a department that aimed to reduce the famine severity and coordinate international assistance. The famine led to the mobilisation of pastoralists and nomads in general, while allowing feudal landlords to force tenants to pay high rents while escorting their retinue of armed guards.

The Wollo famine is regarded as one of the main root causes of Haile Selassie's reign collapse. It has been estimated that the death toll reached 250,000 people in 1975. This caused a peasant rebellion in Ethiopia, which continued through the successive but failed Derg. There was also the rebellion of Dejazmach Berhane Meskel, who assaulted former landlords and government security forces, while also attacking the Derg Militia for multiple years.

== Background ==
Early signs of famine were reported in Tigray Province in 1958. In 1965, a report of famine in Were Ilu reached the Ministry of the Interior. Although local police were informed in November 1965, no immediate action was taken. The information reached the Emperor 320 days later, after which he instructed the Ministry of the Interior to coordinate with local Wollo officials to compile lists of those affected. A limited relief effort was subsequently undertaken.

== Event ==
During the years of 1972/1973, Wollo was struck by famine killing between 40,000 and 80,000 people. In response, the government established the Relief and Rehabilitation Commission (RRC) department to reduce future famines and coordinate international assistance. The Wollo famine was widely blamed on drought, however was mainly a result of terrible government response, an impoverished social system, and a cover-up by the government. A BBC News report has cited a 1973 estimate that 200,000 deaths occurred, based on a contemporaneous estimate from the Ethiopian Nutrition Institute. While this figure is still repeated in some texts and media sources, it was an estimate that was later found to be "over-pessimistic". (Note: De Waal (1991b), "3. Rebellion and famine in the north under Haile Selassie" (PDF), Evil Days, p. 58, n. 7; from .) Although the region is infamous for recurrent crop failures and continuous food shortage and starvation risk, this episode was remarkably severe. A 1973 production of the ITV programme The Unknown Famine by Jonathan Dimbleby relied on the unverified estimate of 200,000 dead, stimulating a massive influx of aid while at the same time destabilising Selassie's administration:

The famine also affected Afar pastoralists during early 1972. The Afars used pasture over the large area to support their herds. The drought forced them to move into Tcheffa Valley, on the rift valley escarpment, and pasture along the inland delta of the Awash River where water was abandoned to the desert. The valley was the location of sorghum farmland in the 1960s, where small farmers in its vicinity moved to the area for commerce. Meanwhile, large cotton plantations developed along Awash River. By 1972, 50,000 hectares of irrigated land had displaced 20,000 Afar pastoralists. In the early 1970s, the Afar mobility was restricted by supply of weaponry to their neighbor nomads and competitors - the Issa - who were ethnic Somali.

The second group who suffered from the severe famine were farmers residing in the middle altitude of north-central Wollo Province, who were tenants. The Raya and Azebo Oromos, who were in a dominant position in opposition during the Woyane Rebellion, experienced land alienation, while others were forced to mortgage or sell their land in response to the distress of harvest failures in the early 1970s. Landlords took advantage of tenants' destitution by forcing them to pay large rents, often in-kind manner. The demand mainly took place by coercion as influential landlords had retinue of armed guards. As a result, the famine area exported grain to the provincial capital, Dessie and to Addis Ababa in 1973.

At that point, the peasants and nomads of Wollo began starving, sabotaging Haile Selassie's reputation, who resolved to ignore them.

The crisis was exacerbated by military mutinies and high oil prices, the latter a result of the 1973 oil crisis. The international economic crisis caused the costs of imported goods, gasoline, and food to skyrocket, while unemployment spiked.

=== 1975 Northern rebellions ===
The Wollo famine contributed to Haile Selassie's government collapse, not only the hunger among peasants and nomads, but also swept among the students and middle classes of Addis Ababa. In the early 1970s, there was a peasant revolution involving feudal leaders in each of the northern provinces; the Wollo group revolt was led by a feudal lord Dejazmach Berhane Meskel. After the fall of Haile Selassie's government following the Ethiopian Revolution, he destroyed Ethiopian Airlines DC–3 at Lalibela on 14 March 1975. He again rallied supporters in October after spree killings of the former landlords by peasants and government security officers.

Berhane's forces were eventually defeated by the Derg militia and air force attacks near Woldiya in December 1975, but continued rebellion against the government for years.

== See also ==
- 1983–1985 famine in Ethiopia
- Famine in northern Ethiopia (2020–present)
