= Famines in Ethiopia =

List of famines that occurred throughout Ethiopian history

Famines in Ethiopia have occurred periodically throughout the history of the country.

The economy was based on subsistence agriculture, with an aristocracy that consumed the surplus. Due to a number of causes, the peasants have lacked incentives to either improve production or to store their excess crops; as a result, they lived from harvest to harvest. Despite the extensive modernization and land reform in the country during the last 120 years, especially under Emperor Haile Selassie, as of 2016, about 80% of the population are poor farmers who still live from harvest to harvest and are vulnerable to crop failures.

== List of famines ==
| Year | Main region affected | Description |
|---|---|---|
| First half of 9th century | | Followed by epidemic. |
| 1272 | Harar | Massive loss of life including aristocrats of the Sultanate of Shewa. |
| 1535 | Tigray (famine and epidemic) | As described in the Futuh al-Habasha, this famine happened during the Ethiopian–Adal War and took a heavy toll on Imam Ahmad Gragn's army: "When they entered Tigray each Muslim had fifty mules; some of them even one-hundred. When they left, each one of them had only one or two mules." Amongst the dead was the Imam's young son Ahmad al-Nagasi. |
| 1540 | | Contemporary accounts, collected by Richard Pankhurst, describe this famine as "worse than that which occurred at the time of the destruction of the Second Temple." |
| 1543 | | Pankhurst provides no details. |
| 1567–1570 | Harar | The famine was accompanied with plague and Oromo expansion. It saw the death of Nur ibn Mujahid, Emir of Harar, by typhus: as J. Spencer Trimingham describes, Emir Nur "exerted every effort to help his people to recover, but after every respite the Oromo would again descend like locusts and scourge the country, and Nur himself died (975/1567–8) of the pestilence which spread during the famine." |
| 1611 | | The heavy rains that fell this year and extreme cold caused extensive crop failures in the northern provinces. Occurring under the reign of Emperor Susenyos I, the plague was referred to as manan tita (literally 'whom did it leave?'). Many people died, particularly in the province of Dembiya. |
| 1625–c. 1627 | | Accounted by both Ethiopians and Portuguese Jesuits—including Jerome Lobo, Afonso Mendes, Gaspar Pais, Thomas Barneto, and Manoel de Almeida—this famine lasted for several years and was said to have been caused by unusually large swarms of locusts. The Jesuits also took this opportunity to convert famine victims to Catholicism. |
| 1634–35 | Tigray | This famine fell under the reign of Emperor Fasilides, as accounted by Emperor Zara Yaqob and philosopher Walda Heywet (supposedly) and by Jesuits Manoel de Almeida and Diego de Mattos. It is said that an epidemic of kantara or fangul (cholera) afflicted Dembiya, which then spread into Tigray. |
| 1650 | | Pankhurst provides no details |
| 1653 | | Epidemic of kabab. |
| 1678 | | Cost of grain inflated; this led to the death of many mules, horses, and donkeys. |
| 1700 | | This may have been the famine that struck Shewa between the reigns of Negasi Krestos and Sebastyanos, as mentioned by Donald N. Levine. |
| 1702 | | Starving peasants were said to have appealed to Emperor Iyasu I at Gondar, insisting that if he did not feed them, they would die. In response, the Emperor and his nobles fed an uncountable number of the destitute for two months. The Emperor reportedly extended his charity to all those in need, whether they be a Jew, "disloyal or a murderer." |
| 1747–48 | | This famine is attributed to locusts. There was also an epidemic of fever (gunfan), possibly influenza, in 1747. |
| 1752 | | According to Pankhurst. A European visitor to Gondar, Remedius Prutky, is silent about this disaster. |
| 1783 | | This famine is referred to as həmame ('my sickness') in The Royal Chronicle of Abyssinia. |
| 1789 | | According to Herbert Weld Blundell, "there was a famine over all the provinces." Dejazmach Hailu Eshte, who was then living in Este, settled many "needy people" in his villages as guards. "And hearing of this report... many commanders who acted as he did adopted his example for themselves." |
| 1796 | | This famine was particularly serious in Gondar, and blamed on an infestation of locusts. |
| 1797 | | From the Royal Chronicle |
| 1800 | | Soldiers died on campaign due to famine. |
| 1829 | Shewa | This famine was followed by a cholera outbreak in 1830–31. Sengwer folklore has it that, the land "became dry and there was great hunger. The Siger went away to the east to Moru Eris, where most of them died of heat and starvation." |
| 1835 | Shewa | Rains failed, leading to famine and "great mortality". |
| 1880–81 | | A cattle plague in 1879 spread from the Adal region, causing famine as far west as Begemder. |
| 1888–92 | | The African rinderpest epizootic of the 1890s, introduced from Indian cattle brought by the Italians for their campaign against Somalia, killed approximately 90% of cattle. Lack of rainfall from as early as 16 November 1888 led to famine in all but southernmost provinces; locusts and caterpillar infestations destroy crops in Akele Guzay, Begemder, Shewa, and around Harar. Conditions worsened with a typhus epidemic, a major smallpox epidemic (1889–90), and cholera outbreaks (1889–92), forcing the coronation of Menelik II to be a subdued event. Various cases of cannibalism were reported, including of a man who killed and consumed his wife and of mothers who ate their children. |
| 1913–14 | | Price of grain increased 30-fold. |
| 1929 | | |
| 1958 | Tigray | The 1958 Tigray famine had a death toll of over 100,000. |
| 1966 | Wollo | Famine broke out in Wollo. |
| 1972–75 | Wollo | The 1972–1975 Wollo famine had a death toll of c. 200,000. This famine spread throughout northern provinces. Failure to adequately handle this crisis contributed to the fall of the Imperial government and the rise of Derg rule. |
| 1984–85 | Tigray and Wollo | The 1983–1985 famine in Ethiopia had a death toll of 1.2 million, leaving "400,000 refugees outside the country, 2.5 million people internally displaced, and almost 200,000 orphans." The majority of the dead were from Tigray and other parts of northern Ethiopia. |
| 2003 | | A severe drought affected 13.2 million people in 2002/2003. Program data showed that thousands of adults and children died despite the large scale humanitarian response. However, despite the drought being the most extensive in the country's modern history, there was a higher child mortality in drought-affected areas but no measurable increase in child mortality amongst the general population. Household-level demographic factors, household-level food and livelihood security, community-level economic production, access to potable water, and household receipt of food aid were predictive of child survival. The latter had a small but significant positive association with child survival. |
| 2021–2022 | Tigray | During the Tigray War, the Ethiopian federal government blocked food and humanitarian aid from entering the region as a weaponization of hunger. This led to a famine that the Ethiopian Parliament classified, as of January 2021, as a crisis (phase 3)/emergency (phase 4) acute food insecurity situation in most of Tigray except for Western Tigray by the Famine Early Warning Systems Network (FEWS NET) under the Integrated Food Security Phase Classification (IPC). |

== See also ==
- Agriculture in Ethiopia
- Food security in Ethiopia
- Famine in India
- List of famines in China
- List of famines
