= Elleni Zeleke =

Ethiopian-born political sciences researcher

Elleni Centime Zeleke (died July 6, 2024) was an Ethiopian-born researcher specialising in Ethiopian political changes in the decades before and after the 1974 Ethiopian Revolution. Elleni published a study of the Ethiopian student movement, its influence on the Ethiopian Revolution and later political changes, and the negative consequences of rigidity in claiming "scientific" validity of the social sciences in Ethiopian intellectual circles and institutional structures. Elleni was assistant professor at Columbia University in New York, United States from 2018 through to her death in 2024.

== Personal life ==
Elleni Centime Zeleke was born in Ethiopia. She spent part of her childhood in Toronto, Guyana and Barbados.

Elleni studied at York University in Toronto, Canada, where she obtained her PhD in social and political thought in 2016.

She died on July 6, 2024, after fighting breast cancer.

== University research and teaching ==
Elleni was an assistant professor of Middle Eastern, South Asian and African Studies at Columbia University in New York, from 2018 to 2024.

== Book: Ethiopia in Theory ==
In 2019, Elleni published Ethiopia in Theory: Revolution and Knowledge Production, 1964–2016, a book presenting her view of half a century of Ethiopian interrelated intellectual and political developments.

The book describes the Ethiopian student movement literature covering sociological theory and social change prior to the 1974 Ethiopian Revolution, and the student movement's influence in helping to destabilise the Emperor Haile Selassie, leading to the revolution. The book also argues that the student movement was a key factor encouraging resistance to Mengistu Hailemariam of the Derg. Ethiopia in Theory continues by discussing the longer term effects of the intellectual debates on the revolution during the following decades. Donald L. Donham describes the book as a philosophical, historical and anthropological study of the effects of what he sees as three main effects of the 1974 revolution: "progressive social measures", "prodigious killing" and the mass departure of Ethiopians into the Ethiopian diaspora. Elleni discussed how Marxism and other ideas of the social sciences were appropriated into Ethiopian and wider African thinking. She studies the role of the diaspora in the revolution and, in Donham's view, "aims [with her book] to reinvigorate revolutionary theory".

Elleni proposed what she called Tizita, meaning "memory" in Amharic, to describe her approach in the book to analysing the social sciences. Michael Kebede described Tizita as a "corrective" to positivism and the book overall as "a profound, cross-disciplinary meditation on the nature and reverberations of a revolution".

Ethiopia in Theory criticises the development and usage of Ethiopian social sciences. Students' belief in the "scientific truth" of their political approach is seen in the book as both a strong motivator for revolutionary changes, and as a factor encouraging violence against those seen as enemies.

Harry Verhoeven describes the book as challenging ideas of "meaningful democratisation of debates around knowledge, authority and indeed liberation ... in an African context". He states that Elleni saw Ethiopian knowledge as being poorly implemented in "academic practice, government policy, civil society activism and the social needs of local communities". She argues that the social sciences should better "be understood as a space that opens up a critical and philosophical dialogue on social reality".
