= Afework Kassu Gizaw =

Ethiopian educator and public official

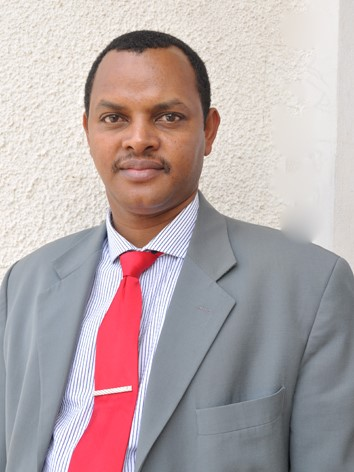

State Minister at the Ministry of Science and Higher Education
- In office October 2018 – October 2021

State Minister at the Ministry of Foreign Affairs
- In office May 2018 – October 2018

State Minister at the Ministry of Science and Technology
- In office October 2015 – May 2018

Personal details
- Born: January 3, 1971 (age 55) Dawro, Ethiopia
- Education: Ph.D.
- Alma mater: University of Tokushima
- Occupation: Professor; government official

Afework Kassu Gizaw (born January 3, 1971) is an Ethiopian educator and government official. He currently serves as Director General of Armauer Hansen Research Institute (AHRI) of the Federal Democratic Republic of Ethiopia since January 2022.

== Early life and education ==
Gizaw was born on January 3, 1971, in Dawro, Ethiopia. He holds a B.Sc. in biology, an M.Sc. in applied microbiology, and a Ph.D. in biomedical science. He also completed a postdoctoral fellowship in Clinical Immunology at the University of Colorado Denver, USA.

== Career ==
He has served as a State Minister at the Ministry of Science and Higher Education, Ministry of Foreign Affairs, and Ministry of Science and Technology of Ethiopia. He has also contributed to the establishment of various councils and advisory committees in Ethiopia, including the Ethiopian Professors Council, the Ministry of Science and Higher Education Advisory Council, the National Council for Research and Tech Transfer on COVID-19, and the Scientific Journals Accreditation System. He is a professor of medical microbiology and immunology at Addis Ababa University, Ethiopia. He also teaches at Gondar University

== Accolades ==
He was awarded the "Decoration of the Order of the Rising Sun, Gold and Silver Star from the Government of Japan in May 2022. He is also a Fellow of the Ethiopian Academy of Sciences and a recipient of the Young Rising Star Award for research activities as well as effective leadership at the University of Gondar He also received the Best Poster Award at the Third Advanced Course on Diagnostics, organized by Foundation Merieux and The London School of Tropical Medicine and Hygiene Les Pensieres Veyver Du Lac, Annecy France in September 2012.
