= Bureaucratic inertia =

Tendency of bureaucracy to perpetuate established procedures

Bureaucratic inertia is the supposed tendency of bureaucratic organizations to perpetuate the established procedures and modes, even if they are counterproductive and/or diametrically opposed to established organizational goals. This unchecked growth may continue independently of the organization's success or failure. Through bureaucratic inertia, organizations tend to take on a life of their own beyond their formal objectives.

== See also ==
- Bureaucratic drift
