= Peasant revolution in Ethiopia =

Rapid changes of peasants in Ethiopia during the Derg regime

There is not much in-depth information available about the revolution in Ethiopia, but the book Peasant Revolution in Ethiopia by John Young provides detailed information about the revolution, why it started, how the Derg affected the nation, and the role of the peasant population in Tigray and Eritrea.

In an effort to undermine the support of its opponent, the Tigray People's Liberation Front (TPLF), the Derg restricted the sale of agricultural implements and machinery to peasants. The Derg's control was subsequently weakened by a famine that disrupted the peasant economy. The famine diverted energies away from mobilization and military campaigns, to relief and reconstruction. In early 1978, the Derg launched a resettlement program with the alleged aim of combating drought, averting famine, and increasing agricultural productivity, although it was not until 1984–85 that the program assumed massive proportions. Its objective was to move 1.5 million peasants from the northern provinces, and by the end of 1986, half a million had been moved, most of them forcibly. By the mid-1980s, the vast majority of the peasantry were irrevocably connected to the TPLF and it was clear that the Derg did not have the capacity to defeat its northern-based opposition. By 1987, the TPLF leadership had concluded that its forces and those of the Derg were roughly in balance and that a stalemate ensued. As a consequence, the Front leadership began preparing plans to break the stalemate.

The dismissal of the PDRE from Tigray in 1989 marked somewhat of an ending to the conflicts in the region, but the war went on until the overthrow of the PDRE and the EPRDF's capture of the entire country in 1991. Although the overthrow of the PDRE brought a much-desired peace, Tigray's transition from a regime of virtual independence to one of measured autonomy in post-1991 Ethiopia has not always been easy. Not only did Tigrayans resent the roles of the central bureaucrats in funding decisions, but they also had little sympathy for their management style that increasingly came to the fore as provincial and national ministries were integrated.

== Challenges and advances ==
The Derg recognized and acknowledged that the Tigray People's Liberation Front (TPLF) was gaining supporters and strength, which was a direct threat to its regime. In an attempt to undermine TPLF support, the Derg began restricting the sale of agricultural implements and machinery to peasants in an effort to cut food production. However, this plan ended up backfiring which also caused harm to the urban-based military which forced the Derg to abandon the practice entirely. Peasants coming from areas where the TPLF had popular support ran the risk of imprisonment for being suspected supporters and responded largely by avoiding towns altogether.

For those who remained in the Derg manned garrisoned towns, life was difficult, particularly for women who were frequently the victims of sexual assault and rape. Explaining the conditions under the regime, a Maichew resident said:

"People had to be clever or tactical. It was a soldier's government and you had to give soldiers food, tej [mead], whatever they wanted. Parents gave their children to marry Derg soldiers to get security. Rape was common, even of priests' wives. The belongings of the wealthy were taken. If parents were rich enough they would send their children to the area, but if the children were young they had to put up with it. You couldn't even sit outside with two or three people, even with one's family, as they might be employed by Derg security. You could only talk about sex, food and tej".

In the face of such persecution many abandoned their homes and left for Sudan and other neighboring countries, while others, primarily youth, fled to the base areas of the Ethiopian People's Revolutionary Party (EPRP) and TPLF. After an individual's disappearance, the Derg would commonly arrest the person's parents and this often led to the other children leaving and joining the opposition. The Derg imposed new taxes to fund its war in Eritrea and other nationwide conflicts and rebellions. The Derg closed most rural schools because they believed that teachers were TPLF sympathizers. The Derg attempted to organize rural administrations, but its methods were harsh and allowed little room for democratic participation. Peasant associations that had started out as bodies representative of local opinion were reduced to the status of organs responsible to the Derg.

Conditions were particularly difficult under the Derg for traders and merchants. The Derg nationalized illegally acquired goods found in the possession of traders, but they would also occasionally take legally acquired merchandise in the name of development or resettlement. In 1983, the TPLF began a concerted program of promoting the development of commercial enterprise, particularly grain, in the areas under its control. However, the limited purchasing power of the peasants and the insecurity of daytime travel discouraged professional traders and encouraged a harder breed of part-time traders who were able to undercut their larger counterparts.

The merchants built capital and began transporting basic consumer items from Derg-controlled towns to the opposition-held territories and TPLF-controlled towns. The TPLF also turned to the merchants for consumer items, such as rubber sandals, sugar, canned milk, and grain. The TPLF also made small raids on Derg supply depots in the towns to acquire badly needed items like bullets and petrol. However, even when the Derg was removed from the Tigray region and the urban and rural areas became integrated, the trading economy could not be fully revived.

As far as political and military struggles are concerned, in 1978 the Relief Society of Tigray (REST)—an organization largely funded by NGOs in the United States, Canada, Australia, and Europe was established as a humanitarian organization with a mandate to co-ordinate relief programs, rehabilitation, and development both in Tigray and among Tigrayan refugees in neighboring countries). The founding of REST reflected the TPLF's need for a specialized body to handle relief and development efforts, and also to respond to the Derg's efforts to restrict the flow of humanitarian and economic assistance to areas of Tigray that were coming under the control of the Front.

Without REST, the TPLF and its supporters would have failed and the Derg would have still been in power. The stabilization the TPLF received from REST also allowed them to mobilize Tigrayans who lived abroad. TPLF efforts to organize expatriate Tigrayans went on among those employed in the Gulf states and the primary student population of Europe and North America. Such expatriates played a vital role in the war by bringing the struggle to the attention of the international media, lobbying governments, gaining support for refugee relief, providing materials and finances for the Front and as a basis from which to recruit fighters.

=== Triumph (1985–1991) ===
The TPLF entered the final period of the war against the Derg who were at this point weakened by the famine that disrupted the peasant economy and diverted energies away from mobilization and military campaigns, to relief and later, reconstruction. At this juncture, the TPLF and peasants were united in struggle and with the passing of the famine many peasants were able to resume their normal livelihoods and continue their support of the opposition fighters in their midst.

The TPLF was soon focused on the key elements of that stage of the struggle: confronting the Derg's plans to forcibly remove its peasant supporters, taking the revolution to the heterogeneous people of southern Tigray, and resolving political disagreements with the EPLF in preparation for the removal of the Derg from Tigray and the entire country. The Derg's war against the liberation movements had many dimensions but were not limited to, military campaigns; reform programs to win the support of civilians; and efforts to isolate peasants from the appeal of dissidents, such as its resettlement program. From 1950 to 1974, an estimated one million peasants voluntarily left the northern highlands and moved to the south and west of the country, and evidence suggests that Tigray had the largest net outflow of any of the provinces.

In early 1978, the Derg launched a resettlement program with the alleged aim of combating drought, averting famine, and increasing agricultural productivity, although it was not until 1984–85 that the program assumed massive proportions. Its objective was to move 1.5 million peasants from the northern provinces, and by the end of 1986, half a million had been moved, most of them forcibly. Although by the mid-1980s the Derg had lost control of virtually all of rural Tigray and the army continued to attack population centers in the liberated territories until the final days of the war.

There are no official statistics that could give an overall assessment of the human and material costs of the war since detailed figures have not been released of the number of fighters killed. The TPLF revealed that approximately 50,000 people died as a direct result of combat, 99 percent of the fighters and militia members, and this number also includes those killed in the Red Terror. Despite the military setback caused by the famine of 1984–85, the vast majority of the peasantry were irrevocably connected to the TPLF and it was clear that the Derg did not have the capacity to defeat its northern-based opposition.

With the stabilization of the rural economy resulting from better harvests and the return of some refugees from Sudan, the TPLF was soon able to re-assert its control and influence in the rural areas and resume the siege of the towns. By 1987 TPLF leadership had concluded that its forces and those of the Derg were roughly in balance and that a stalemate ensued. As a consequence, the Front leadership began preparing plans to break the stalemate. While the TPLF was able to mobilize growing human and material resources, the inability of the Derg to cause serious damage to its fighting forces led to declining morale among its officers. Despite its ability to recruit and field a large number of troops to replace those lost in battle, the Derg was nonetheless singularly unsuccessful in inculcating faith in the regime, or a willingness on the part of its soldiers to keep the fight going.

Meanwhile, growing TPLF inroads into the provinces of Wollo and Gondar led the Derg to plan another major campaign against the Front in the summer and autumn of 1987, a campaign that was aborted after the TPLF launched a three-pronged pre-emptive strike against the communications center of Mugulat outside Adigrat, and the eastern towns of Sinkata and Wukro. The Derg's counterattack failed badly and the stage was set for the TPLF's biggest military victory up to that point in the war, which culminated in the 1988 capture of the towns. The battle for the towns began with an attack on the Derg's communication center of Mugulat in the northeast and after it was destroyed, the TPLF launched offensives against army bases at Axum and Adwa in central Tigray.

So quick was the collapse of these towns that Derg forces sent from Endaselasie to relieve the garrisons found themselves attacked at Selekleka, and instead were forced to retreat before TPLF fighters moving west along the highway. The fighting, which was the heaviest of the Tigrayan war, went on for two days before the army's positions were overrun. The TPLF was also not prepared to hold the towns at this time when it did not have the resources to properly manage them. Government employees and teachers who could not be paid from the TPLF's meager funds were encouraged to move to Derg-held towns. Although it is clear that both the people and the fighters were unhappy at the impending turnover of the towns to the Derg, the TPLF was able to carry out its political work, establish underground cells and prepare for the next stage of the war. As a consequence of its losses in Eritrea and Tigray, the Derg ended its state of belligerence with neighboring Somalia, thus freeing up troops and materials that could be transferred to the northern war zones.

Another mobilization campaign was started and the Derg ordered, for security reasons, the expulsion of all foreign aid workers from Tigray and Eritrea on 6 April 1988, a move interpreted as ensuring that foreign observers would be unable to witness the events that were to unfold. Some of the Derg's most heinous inflictions of atrocities throughout the war on the Tigrayan civilian population took place during the following months. In particular, an all-day attack by helicopter gunships and MiGs resulted in 1,800 civilian deaths, the worst single atrocity of the entire war from the start of the ELF insurrection in 1961. However, with the Derg largely restricted to the towns along the main roads and the TPLF in almost complete control of the countryside, the regime no longer had the capacity to cause the civilian dislocation that was needed if the TPLF was to be seriously weakened.

== TPLF and the peasants ==
It was necessary that the TPLF gain the support of the peasants if it wanted to win the war. A program of reforms that balanced the needs of peasants for land redistribution, effective services, and accountable administration with the needs of the TPLF for growing committed support and the armed struggle became necessary. The objective was to consider the TPLF-peasant relationship in five areas critical to winning their support for the war effort: education and culture, the Church, women, land reform, and local administration.

Much of the TPLF nationalist appeal was predicated on the main point that peasant poverty and lack of infrastructure in the villages were the results of state domination by an Amhara elite that wanted to keep Tigray in subjugation. Peasants responded by asking the TPLF as "sons of Tigray" to supply their communities with the facilities and basic local services they needed, and high on the list were schools and education. The TPLF responded by preparing the curriculum and overseeing construction of "green" (camouflaged) schools that could be hidden from the Derg. Merchants typically supplied blackboards, exercise books and materials from the towns, and maintenance and salaries of 100 Birr a month were paid by the local residents.

Schools were particularly attractive for the TPLF, not only because they advance the cultural awareness of the people but they also served to deepen political and national consciousness and train a future generation of youth who could be utilized in the struggle. Although peasants were involved in all aspects of educational reforms when it was found that there were insufficient funds to meet all the demands for schooling, the TPLF chose to educate mainly those who could be utilized as fighters and administrators.

Thus the initial emphasis on schooling for children aged 6–12 was changed to youth between 12 and 18, a clear reflection of the primacy of the TPLF military objectives. Apart from formal education, throughout the revolution the TPLF placed great emphasis on developing Tigrayan culture as a means to mobilize peasants. In particular, the peasants' oral tradition was put to considerable use and from the earliest days of the revolution the TPLF introduced drama, which although new to the peasants proved highly effective. While the TPLF's organization of schools and clinics in the rural areas advanced the movement's popularity, its Marxist–Leninist sympathies risked opposition from the powerful Ethiopian Orthodox Church and offending the strong religious beliefs of the Tigrayan peasants.

=== Church ===
The Derg's approach to the established church was ill-adapted to winning popular support, due to its victimization of students and teachers. Distributing church lands was widely approved, but atheism and attacks on church dogma, practices, and priests were abhorred by the conservative Tigrayan peasants. As church officials acknowledged, "the Derg knew that the Ethiopian people followed their religion and if it opposed the church directly, people would oppose the Derg, but at the same time he [the Derg] undermine the Church and religion indirectly'. Unlike the Derg, the TPLF recognized that although the Ethiopian Orthodox Church was a major component of Ethiopian feudalism, it was not a monolithic institution.

Some priests rejected the church's prohibition against taking up arms and they became TPLF fighters, but most were too old to keep up with the teachers in Front-established schools. With the TPLF's blessing many participated in local administration, although they were never permitted to dominate mass associations. With its doctrinal fixation on the establishment of a Marxist state in Ethiopia, the Derg proved incapable of understanding the peasants' religious attachments and sentiments. Like its attacks on the educated youth in the towns, the Derg's assault on the Church and the mosque and their rural representatives was a major cause of peasant estrangement. The TPLF worked within and through the religiously overlaid society of Tigray; while this placed constraints on its reforms, it also served to preclude Church-based opposition and win the support of peasants.

=== Women ===
Overcoming the age-old fetters on the role of women was a major concern of the TPLF from its earliest days in the west, in part because attacking female oppression was consistent with its liberation philosophy, but also because the TPLF needed to use all the human resources of Tigray in the struggle against the Derg. The first Women's Mass Associations were established in 1978 in Sheraro and Zana, which were among the earliest woredas to be liberated and were deemed to have a high level of political consciousness. While the separation of women from men during mobilization drives might suggest that their problems were perceived as being unique, this was not the general philosophy subscribed to by the TPLF.

Although women were not at first welcomed as fighters into the TPLF, by 1983 the Front claimed that one-third of the fighters were women, it was recognized that the term 'fighter' referred to a range of positions and not just those involved in military combat. Despite these measures and the support they had among Tigrayan women, in the mid-1980s it was decided to restrict the number of women recruited as fighters. The TPLF argued that the reasons for this change of policy were that domestic life was being disrupted because so many women became fighters; women could make a valuable contribution to the war effort through activities in their home and villages; the educational levels for becoming a fighter were raised to five years and many women did not meet these criteria; and lastly, the war was moving to a conventional form that placed more emphasis on physical strengths. As TPLF Central Committee member Aregash acknowledged, for peasant women 'being a fighter is such a liberation for them', and as a result, the decision to reduce the number of women fighters 'created resentment among the women in the villages'.

It seems likely that the TPLF's decision to restrict the numbers of women into their ranks was a response to unease in the villages and, more specifically, the appeals of Tigrayan fathers, and the influence of the Church and the Mosque. Two years after it was started, the program was abruptly ended because, according to the TPLF, teaching women how to plow served to increase their already burdensome responsibilities; in addition, it was argued that plowing was too heavy a work for women. As a result, in Zana, which was one of the first woredas where this program was introduced, no women were plowing in 1993. If the official reasons for discontinuing the plowing program can be discounted then the assumption must be that the TPLF feared that encouraging women to plow was offending by challenging the core religious and social beliefs about women in rural Tigrayan society.

=== Tigray ===
In the ritsi-held lands of Ethiopia, which includes Tigray, peasants have always taken a close interest in government measures that could impact their access to land. The extent to which the Derg's land reform was carried out in Tigray is difficult to ascertain. It is clear that land held by the nobility was confiscated, and gulti obligations terminated by the peasants on their own, very quickly after they heard of the Derg's 1975 proclamation. However, formal land redistributions were rarely initiated by peasants, and the Derg's weak presence in the province before 1977-8 meant that they were probably not carried out in most of the province. Unlike some other areas of Ethiopia, highland Tigray had little commercial potential and therefore no state farms were established. A surplus of land in the southern kola lands led the Derg to organize many cooperative farms and move poor peasants from Agame and central Tigray to work on these lands.

After the Derg retreated from the area, the TPLF organized a conference where various systems of land tenure were discussed and voted on, and cooperative farming was overwhelmingly rejected. The Derg also failed to appreciate the different levels of interest in land reform across regions when land reform should have gained the Derg a basis of peasant support in Tigray. Both Derg and TPLF land reforms were designed to restructure the rural political economy and win peasant support, but the regime's reforms proved to be a political failure, and the Front's reforms served as the basis around which they mobilized the peasants of the province. While the Derg's land distribution involved violence and resulted in their friends getting superior shares, the TPLF ensures that their program provided an equitable distribution of land and was carried out by the peasants.

While the demand for equitable and democratically implemented land reform was heard across Tigray, in the less populated and lower lands of the west, Tembien, and the south-east, the major issue for peasants was 'unfair' administration. Peasants from these areas repeatedly expressed their concern over an inadequate and corrupt administration, poor infrastructure, land insecurity, and shiftas who emerged from the forests at night to prey on poor farmers. The lack, or weakness, of imperial government institutions, or the steady decline in the effectiveness of the central state as distance increased from the core, explains the prevalence of shifta in these areas. Shifta groups operated with little threat from established authority and this led many peasants to conclude that the nobility and shiftas worked in conjunction.

To combat this, the establishment of mass associations and local administrations in the liberated territories and lowlands was a critical element in the TPLF's peasant mobilization. Of particular importance in achieving legitimacy of local administration was the establishment of a system of courts. The differences between courts under the imperial regime and those under the TPLF are that the TPLF established courts at all levels of their administration.

== Conclusion ==
The dismissal of the PDRE from Tigray in 1989 marked somewhat of an ending, but the war went on until the overthrow of the PDRE and the EPRDF's capture of the entire country in 1991. Although the overthrow of the PDRE brought a much-desired peace, Tigray's transition from a regime of virtual independence to one of measured autonomy in post-1991 Ethiopia has not always been easy. Not only did Tigrayans resent the roles of central bureaucrats in funding decisions, but they also had little sympathy for their management style that increasingly came to the fore as provincial and national ministries were integrated.

In 1993, transitional problems were still evident, although funding was getting through and some investment was taking place as people repaired damaged buildings and constructed new ones, and Tigrayan entrepreneurs began investing in the province. However, the rural economy was still in limbo and faced a crisis as pressing as when the TPLF launched its revolution eighteen years earlier. Evidence of this was apparent in 1994 when parts of Tigray again suffered a famine.

The TPLF was committed to rehabilitating and developing the rural economy and have long recognized that its land reforms and rehabilitation programs cannot by themselves overcome the contradiction between an ever-increasing population on one hand and a fertile land base which can only be marginally enlarged in the near future, on the other. As a result, in addition to environmental rehabilitation and a vast expansion of infrastructure in the rural areas (albeit from extremely low levels), the TPLF pressed ahead with attempts to establish large-scale commercial agriculture in the lowlands, particularly in the Humera area, where land shortages are not a problem.

Major efforts were also underway to establish and facilitate the establishment of an industrial base in the province. By 1995, private investors had overcome their fears of government policy and instability, and investment was largely restricted to the service sector like hotels, restaurants, and stores proliferated in the towns of Tigray particularly in Mekelle.

Most of these projects can only bear fruit in the medium to long term and in any case, cannot begin to absorb the growing population of peasants without land or sufficient land to support themselves. Moreover, having borne a heavy burden during the years of war peasants are impatient with the pace of development. It is clear that having been repeatedly told that their poverty was largely due to the state being controlled by regimes unsympathetic to their plight, peasants look for support from a government led by those they consider their sons.

Apart from the key concern of Tigray's chronic underdevelopment, the approach to, and outcome of, three other issues will speak forcefully to the evolving character of Tigrayan society. These issues are, first, the challenges and implications of growing economic and regional inequality produced in Tigray in the post-Derg period; secondly, whether local-level populist democratic institutions developed during the revolutionary war to meet the needs of the TPLF's peasant base are still appropriate or can be reformed to meet the needs of a more heterogeneous populace in an area of peace; and lastly the variance between the ethos of revolutionary transformation and peasant traditionalism as reflected in the latter's attachment to the faith of the Orthodox Church.

The TPLF's decision not to redistribute capital, restricted consumption, and the limited availability of consumer goods during the revolution ensured that rural class differentiation had little opportunity to develop. Increasing rural and regional inequality is furthered by TPLF support for plantation agriculture in lowland areas, particularly in the Humera area of western Tigray where booming conditions exist. Even more significant in producing rural inequality, is the growing number of landless peasants, the result of the TPLF decision not to allow any further major land redistribution because of fears that with a limited land base and a growing population, farm plots would quickly become uneconomic.

Changing peasant attitudes to land appear to be based on several factors. First, in 1993, peasants held that with little work in the urban areas any weakening of the existing system of land tenure would produce landlessness and force-land poor-peasants to move to the towns and lives of destitution. Secondly, this buoyant urban economy, together with a more stable rural economy, and the effects of road building and dam construction, created increasing opportunities for commercial agriculture and the establishment of small rural enterprises for a minority of peasants. Thirdly, while government-initiated programs to supply fertilizers and seeds to poor peasants at marginal costs are proving successful at reducing poverty and stabilizing the rural economy, other programs, such as Global 2000, are designed for the limited number of peasants in a position to seriously engage in commercial agriculture.

Another issue of concern is whether a range of administrative institutions created during the revolution to meet the needs of that period can survive or will have to be modified with the advent of peace when the all-consuming objective is no longer the pursuit of victory in the war, but development instead.
