= Jason Clay =

Agriculture sustainability leader

Jason W. Clay (1951–2026) was a scientist and a conservation leader, and a Senior Vice President in the World Wildlife Fund.

== Philanthropic efforts and board memberships ==
Clay served on numerous boards, including EAT. He has written over 300 articles, 15 books, and given many public presentations. He is known for championing food as an environmental issue and for pioneering corporate engagement on food system sustainability: he helped create over twenty certifications; set up multiple industry platforms to promote sectoral transformation for sustainability, including the Global Salmon Initiative and the Aquaculture Stewardship Council.

He collaborated with the founders of ice cream brand Ben & Jerry's to create the Rainforest Crunch flavor to help support indigenous groups producing non-timber forest products in the late 1980s.

Clay also created the concept of Codex Planetarius to create a minimum environmental standard for globally traded food.

== Awards and recognition ==
He has won numerous awards, including being named a National Geographic Explorer (and the National Geographic Society's first food and agricultural fellow), a James Beard Foundation Leadership Award, and the Dr. Jean Mayer Global Citizenship Award.
