= Government of the Derg =

Political system in Ethiopia

Provisional Military Government of Socialist Ethiopia (1974–1987); People's Democratic Republic of Ethiopia (1987–1991)
- Unitary Marxist-Leninist one-party provisional government under a totalitarian military junta (1974–1987); Unitary Marxist-Leninist one-party socialist republic (1987–1991)
- Emblem of the Provisional Military Administrative Council (Derg)
- Formation: 12 September 1974
- Extinction: 28 May 1991
- Country: Ethiopia; Eritrea

Legislative branch
- Legislature: None (ruled by decree) (1974–1987); National Shengo (1987–1991)
- Meeting place: National Palace, Addis Ababa, Ethiopia

Executive branch
- Chairman: Aman Andom (1974); Tafari Benti (1974–1977); Mengistu Haile Mariam (1974; 1977–1991)
- Monarch (designated): Amha Selassie (1974–1975)
- Prime Minister: Fikre Selassie Wogderess (1987–1989)

The government of the Derg was Unitary and Marxist–Leninist with communist, and later socialist, ideology. Translated literally, the Derg means "the Committee". Opposing the feudal system of Ethiopia, the Derg abolished land tenure in March 1975 and began widespread land reform under the Land Reform Proclamation. All means of production were nationalized by the regime, including housing, land, farms and industry.

The Ethiopian socialism they employed allowed peasants to freely distribute their land and form peasant associations. In 1984, the Derg formed the Workers' Party of Ethiopia (WPE), headed by Mengistu Haile Mariam, and formalized the establishment of the People's Democratic Republic of Ethiopia in 1986.

The Derg aligned with the Eastern bloc (The Soviet Union, Cuba, and Eastern European states) and considered the Soviet Union considered a "natural ally to Ethiopia". However, the fall of communism in Eastern Europe in 1989 contributed to the decline of socialism and the Derg lost their connection with the Soviet Union. By March 1990, the popularity of socialism declined enough that the Derg renamed its ruling party to the Ethiopian Democratic Party (EDP), and opened membership to non-Marxists.

== Provisional Military Government of Socialist Ethiopia ==
Upon deposing Emperor Haile Selassie on 12 September 1974 and seizing power, the Derg adopted their title and formed a provisional administrative council of soldiers with socialist and military ideology. Initially, the Derg was popular after they came to power, and held slogans such as: "Ethiopia First", "Land to the peasants", and "Democracy and Equality to all". All means of production were nationalized, including land, housing, farms, and industry. In January and February of 1975, the regime extended its nationalization efforts to encompass all banks and insurance firms, as well as taking control of nearly every major company.

The Derg promoted Ethiopian socialism, which emphasized self-reliance, the dignity of labor, and "the supremacy of the common good". On the 4th of March, 1975, the Derg proclaimed sweeping land reforms and drafted the Land Reform Proclamation, aiming to eliminate the complex land tenure system. This allowed the peasants to take over the land and assemble themselves into "peasant associations", while the government, partly for ideological reasons, did not control the process. The peasants preferred to either redistribute land among themselves or engage in collective forms of land cultivation. By September 1977, the number of associations had increased to 24,700, with membership of over 6.7 million people.

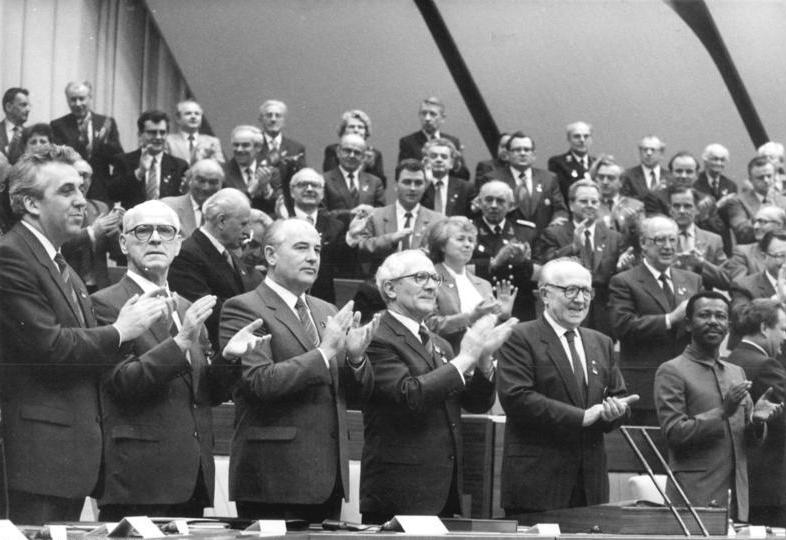
Mengistu Haile Mariam (fifth in row) at SED Party Congress in Berlin, April 1986

For international support, the Derg had initially approached the Western Bloc, but soon shifted towards the Eastern Bloc due to the lack of US support for Ethiopia and the recurring human rights violations in the country. Similar to the regime's predecessors, their foreign policy of was characterized by a focus on military-defense capabilities against the "historical enemies of Ethiopia." However, their foreign policy diverged from their predecessors in several ways, including the influence of Marxist–Leninist ideology and concepts of society on their policies, and their strong commitment to the Soviet Union.

In 1984, the Derg transformed itself into the Workers' Party of Ethiopia (WPE) and formalized its rule by establishing the People's Democratic Republic of Ethiopia (PDRE) in 1986.

== Decline of socialism ==
Emblem of the People's Democratic Republic of Ethiopia

In 1990, after a failed coup against Mengistu in 1989 and following the collapse of communism in Eastern Europe, socialism was abandoned. Mengistu's government faced challenges such as losing access to affordable fuel and arms supply. As a result, free-market policies were implemented, allowing opposition groups to join a unity party. By March 1990, socialism had completely ended in the country and the ruling party was renamed from the Workers' Party of Ethiopia to the Ethiopian Democratic Party, with membership open to non-Marxists.
