= Ethiopian Revolution =

1974 period of sociopolitical upheaval in Ethiopia

- Part of Opposition to Haile Selassie
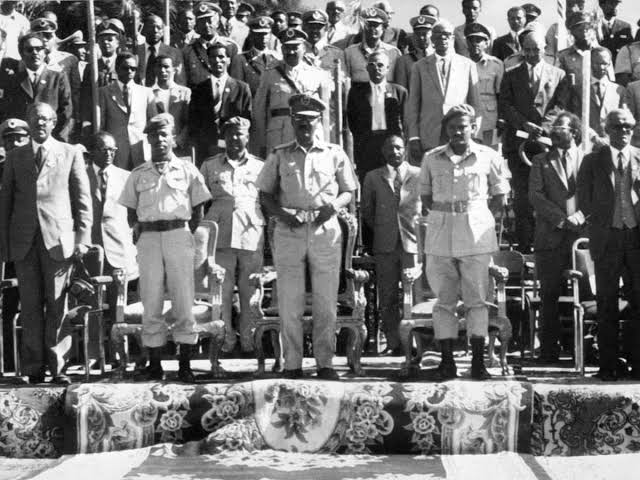
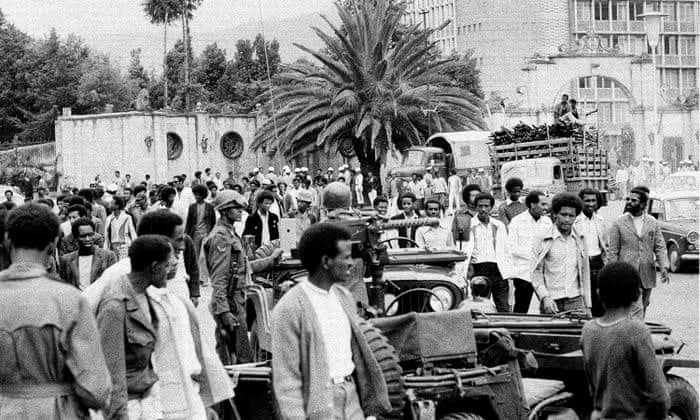
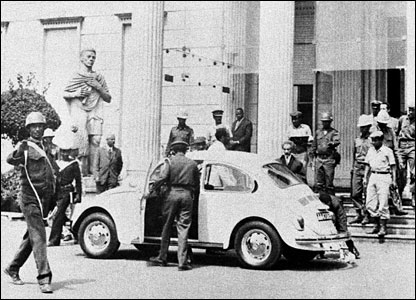
- Clockwise from top: The Coordinating Committee of the Armed Forces (Derg); the arrest of Haile Selassie in the 1974 coup d'état; public demonstration on 24 August 1974
- Date: 12 January – 12 September 1974 (8 months)
- Location: Ethiopian Empire
- Caused by: Discontent with the imperial government of Haile Selassie; 1973–1975 Wollo famine; 1973 oil crisis; Inflation
- Goals: Human rights, social change, agrarian and land reforms, price controls, free schooling, releasing political prisoners
- Methods: Mutiny; Political demonstrations
- Result: Haile Selassie deposed by the military on 12 September 1974; Establishment of the Provisional Military Administrative Council (Derg); Beginning of the Ethiopian Civil War

The Ethiopian Revolution (Amharic: የኢትዮጵያ አብዮት) was a period of civil, police and military upheaval in Ethiopia to protest against the weakened Haile Selassie government. It is generally considered to have begun on 12 January 1974 when Ethiopian soldiers began a mutiny in Negele Borana, a town located in southern Ethiopia, with the protests continuing into February 1974. People from different occupations, starting from junior army officers, students and teachers, and taxi drivers, joined a strike to demand human rights, social change, agrarian reforms, price controls, free schooling, and releasing political prisoners, and labor unions demanded a fixation of wages in accordance with price indexes, as well as pensions for workers, etc.

The Coordinating Committee of the Armed Forces, later called the Derg, formed on 27 June 1974. It was initially made up of 109 privates, noncommissioned officers, and junior officers below the rank of lieutenant colonel, drawn from various ethnicities and regions of the country. The committee decided to seize power from the emperor while confronting the Prime Minister, Endelkachew Makonnen.

By September of that year, the Derg began detaining Endalkachew's closest advisors, dissolved the Crown Council and Imperial Court and disbanded the emperor's military staff. The Ethiopian Revolution ended with the 12 September coup d'état against Haile Selassie by the Coordinating Committee.

== Background ==
For many centuries, the Ethiopian Empire had a semi-feudal mode of production, with most land held by the church (25%), the Emperor (20%), the feudal lords (30%) and the state (18%), leaving a mere 7% to the roughly 23 million Ethiopian peasants. The landless peasants lost as much as 75% of their produce to the landlords, leaving them miserably poor. Haile Selassie had also promised to reform and modernize the country.

The late 1960s in Ethiopia included student movements developing their knowledge of and debating the social sciences and social change. Their debates were influential in their opposition to Emperor Haile Selassie. On 13 December 1960, elements of the Imperial Bodyguard tried but failed to dethrone Haile Selassie while he was abroad. The coup was led by the commander of the Imperial Bodyguard, Brigadier General Mengistu Neway, and his brother Girmame, with the reluctant involvement of police chief Brigadier General Tsige Dibbu and security chief Colonel Workneh Gebeyehou. Poorly planned and badly coordinated, it was extinguished within three days. All the ringleaders were killed or imprisoned, but the coup nonetheless subverted the monarchy's authority and stirred a decade of political protest that did not abate until 1974.

The Wollo famine overshadowed the emperor's reputation, affecting the peasants. In the 1960s peasant revolts broke out in several provinces. A pauperized peasantry rose in Bale, Sidamo, Wollo and Gojjam between 1963 and 1970. The revolt in Bale lasted from 1963 to 1968 and was not pacified until 1970, making it the second-longest and bloodiest of these uprisings. It sustained itself longer than the others partly because Somalia, which was in territorial dispute with Ethiopia, provided military and logistical support. The government negligence in dealing with the famine was known by this point, and no relief effort report arrived via the Ministry of the Interior.

As the regime of Emperor Haile Selassie declined, the army became increasingly politicized as Selassie increasingly relied on more oppressive measures of governance. As recruitment of educated Ethiopians to the military grew during the 1960s and early 1970s, the political consciousness of the armed forces grew as well. This awareness grew as the army was increasingly utilized to put down student protests, peasant uprisings and regional revolts in Ogaden, Bale, and Eritrea. The multiplication of regional revolts and economic downturn in the country during the early 1970s made many army units rebellious as their living conditions deteriorated. The military mutiny that precipitated the 1974 revolution began as demands for better working conditions and wages for troops in remote regions, particularly the Ogaden, Negele and the desert of western Eritrea.

By 1973, it was clear to many observers that the army was the true power behind the throne and it was widely expected that the military would take over in the event of the Emperor's death. Since the failed Ethiopian coup attempt during 1960, no further coup were attempted largely due to the deep divisions within the armed forces, particularly the officer corps.

== Events ==
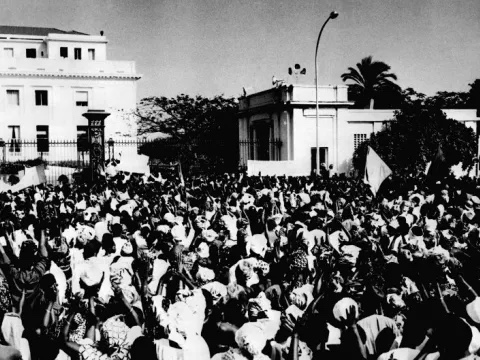
Demonstration during the Ethiopian Revolution

When the first social unrest and mutinies broke out across the country during 1974, the Ethiopians had the largest military in sub-Saharan Africa. The Ethiopian Revolution is widely considered to have begun on 12 January 1974 when the Twenty-fourth Brigade of the Fourth Division, stationed at a military outpost in Neghele to quell disturbances by the local Oromo and Somali populations, mutinied against their officers over low pay and wretched living conditions. When the army commander arrived to calm them, the soldiers detained him. This act sent shockwaves through the military, whose regulars and noncommissioned officers began agitating for price controls, higher wages, better pension and injury benefits, and better living conditions. In February 1974, the military rulers of the Ethiopian Army, who were not ideologically united, comprised conservatives, moderates and radicals. In the process of socialist reforms, the radicals emerged victorious and wrested state power. In April, the Ethiopian Muslim protests occurred which was considered a massive rally at the time as over 100,000 citizens were witnessed participating.

The Coordinating Committee of the Armed Forces formed in June 1974, later called the Derg, which decided to seize power from the emperor while confronting the Prime Minister, Endelkachew Makonnen. Endelkachew was criticized for his backwardness in reforms which the Emperor, as the constitutional head, agreed to. On the Coordinating Committee's recommendation, Haile Selassie appointed him Chief of Staff of the Armed Forces in early July 1974.

=== September Revolution ===
Endalkachew resigned from office on 22 July and went to Djibouti; the Coordinating Committee took power by the end of the year. On 12 September, they arrested Haile Selassie, who remained at the National Palace until his death on 27 August 1975. In December 1974 the committee issued a populist manifesto explaining its political philosophy of "Ethiopian Socialism," whose cardinal elements were "equality; self-reliance; the dignity of labor; the supremacy of the common good; and the indivisibility of Ethiopian Unity." This was expressed as "Ethiopia First" (Itiopia Tikdem).

== Analysis ==
Elleni Zeleke argues that 1960s' student movements' views on social sciences and social change were major factors in not only the 1974 revolution itself, but also in socially progressive and lethally repressive aspects of the revolution, and in the later fall of the Derg and events during the rule of the Ethiopian People's Revolutionary Democratic Front.
