= SkyWin Aeronautics Industry =

Aerospace manufacturer

- Type: Subsidiary
- Industry: Aerospace, Defense
- Founded: 2025; 1 year ago
- Founder: Ethiopian Government
- Headquarters: Addis Ababa, Ethiopia
- Divisions: Aerostructures, Defense, Mechanical Systems, Missions Systems, Power & Controls

SkyWin Aeronautics Industry is an Ethiopian company specializing in the manufacturing of unmanned aerial vehicles (UAVs), commonly known as drones. The company produces drones for both civilian and military applications. It was officially inaugurated by Prime Minister Abiy Ahmed on March 8, 2025.

== History ==
Reports indicate that construction of the SkyWin Aeronautics Industry commenced approximately two years prior to its official inauguration. The establishment of this industry is part of the Ethiopian government's broader strategy to achieve technological self-reliance, particularly within the security sector. This development coincides with Ethiopia's increasing utilization of drone technology in both military operations and civilian applications.

== Products and Capabilities ==
SkyWin Aeronautics Industry manufactures a range of UAVs designed for diverse capabilities. The company's stated objective is to produce drones for both civilian purposes, including surveillance, agriculture, and infrastructure monitoring, and military applications, such as reconnaissance and combat.

Prime Minister Abiy Ahmed has stated that Ethiopia has developed the capacity to not only produce and utilize drones but also to export them. However, independent verification of these export capabilities is currently lacking. The industry is also focused on the development and integration of smart sensor technologies into its drone production.

== Strategic Significance ==
The establishment of SkyWin Aeronautics Industry is considered a significant milestone in Ethiopia's efforts to strengthen its domestic defense industry. This industry is part of a larger government initiative aimed at industrialization, which includes the development of other defense-related industries, such as the Homicho Ammunition Engineering Complex.

The industry's development is taking place during a period of regional tension, including the ongoing conflict in the Amhara region and speculated rising tensions between Ethiopia and Eritrea.

== Controversies and Criticisms ==
Concerns have been raised regarding the transparency of government spending on the SkyWin Aeronautics Industry. Questions have also been raised about the actual level of the company's export capabilities.

== See also ==
- Military of Ethiopia
- Unmanned aerial vehicle
- Homicho Ammunition Engineering Complex
