= People's Militia (Ethiopia) =

Former paramilitary force in Ethiopia (1975–1991)

- የህዝብ ሚሊሻ
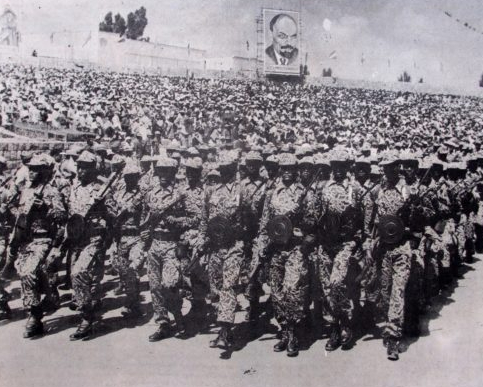
- People's Militia parade on the Revolution Square, 1977.
- Active: 1975
- Disbanded: 1991
- Country: Ethiopia; Eritrea
- Allegiance: Ethiopia
- Branch: Ethiopian Revolutionary Armed Forces
- Type: Paramilitary force
- Size: 200,000 (1991)
- Equipment: List

The People's Militia (Amharic: የህዝብ ሚሊሻ) was a civil defense paramilitary force in the Provisional Military Government of Socialist Ethiopia and the succeeding People's Democratic Republic of Ethiopia. It was a largely rural organization, under the direction of Addis Ababa. It was frequently armed with more antique weapons, particularly those that were used during the Second Italo-Ethiopian War.

== History ==
=== Early years ===
It was established in 1975 by proclamation No. 71 of the Derg to "safeguard the revolution", referring to the coup d'état that brought it to power. It was intended to be a regional force to assist in auxiliary police duties, such as protect property and farms. It also enforced decisions implemented by peasant association tribunals. In May 1976, the government conscripted 30,000 to 40,000 civilians into the militia, predominantly from the Shewa, Wollo, and Gojam provinces.

=== Ogaden War ===
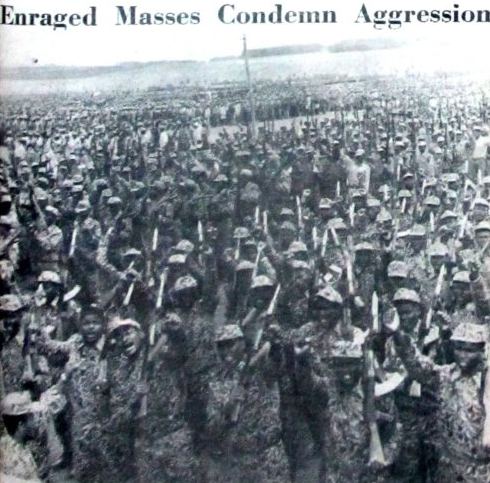
Demonstration of People's Militia, 1977

During the Ogaden War, the government dispatched the militia to Eritrea with the mission of repelling the "invading Arab infidel." In the spring of 1977, Derg Chairman Mengistu Haile Mariam reconstituted the People's Militia as the "Red Army", authorizing its expansion and rearmament with modern weapons provided by the Soviet Union, such as AK-47 rifles and rocket-propelled grenade launchers. He also established a twelve-week basic training at camps in five cities, including Shashemene, Awash, and Fiche. It was then re-deployed to the Ogaden to serve with the regular army. Over the course of the war, the People's Militia won several battles against the Somali National Army.

=== Later years ===
From the early to mid-1980s, the People's Militia declined in importance, largely due the quality of life for militiamen. In addition, the establishment of the National Military Service Proclamation in May 1983 required all Ethiopian men between the ages of 18 and 30 to undergo six months of military training followed by two years of active duty, after which they would be placed on reserve status until age 50, effectively removing the need to maintain a large-scale militia. Government training for militiamen continued even into the establishment of the PDRE, especially from villages in frontier areas.

By 1991 the People's Militia numbered around 200,000, with militia units supporting the regular army's counterinsurgency operations, including one in late 1989 against the Tigray People's Liberation Front and the Ethiopian People's Democratic Movement.

== Organization ==
By 1980, the People's Militia numbered 150,000 troops and was organized into ten divisions. They included the following:

- Northern People's Militia (Eritrea)
- Eastern People's Militia (Ogaden)

== See also ==
- Ethiopian National Defense Force
- Territorial Army (Ethiopia)
