= Hardship =

Hardship may refer to:

- Hardship clause, in contract law
- Hardship post, in a foreign service
- Extreme hardship, in immigration law
- Undue hardship, in employment law and other areas
