= Defense Industry Sector (Ethiopia) =

Ethiopian military industrial office

- Formation: 1953; 73 years ago (as Defense Industry Coordinating Office); 2007; 19 years ago (as Defense Industry Sector)
- Type: Defense contractor
- Region served: Ethiopia
- Owner: Ministry of Defense
- Subsidiaries: Hibret Machine Tools Engineering Complex; Gafat Armament Engineering Complex; Homicho Ammunition Engineering Complex; Bishoftu Motorization Engineering Complex; Dejen Aviation Engineering Complex; Nazareth Canvass and Garment Factory; Zuqualla Steel Rolling Mill; Branna Printing Enterprise

The Defense Industry Sector is an office under the Ministry of Defense responsible for administering several defense industries in Ethiopia. Its objective is to provide for and support the Ethiopian National Defense Force.

== History ==
The manufacturing of modern weaponry in Ethiopia was started in the 19th century during the era of Emperor Tewodros II. Historical records show Emperor Tewodros built a huge mortar called Sebastopol in 1868, in Begemder (or Gondar) province at a village named Gafat, and took it to the mountain of Maqdala. Later, under the reign of Emperor Menelik II, an ammunition factory was established in 1911, which started producing cartridges for Wejigra and Wechefor rifles.

The basis for modern defense industry was laid with the establishment of the then Emperor Haile Selassie ammunition factory in 1953 with the cooperation of Czechoslovakia. Its objective was to locally manufacture ammunition for light weapons. In 1984, it was expanded with newer technology and more capacity.

Due to the serious attention given towards building a strong defense industry, the Derg regime set out to build various defense factories with support from the former Soviet Union and other Eastern Bloc nations. In 1986, the government issued a directive to form a Defense Industry Commission reporting to the council of ministers which would be responsible for administration, production and strategic direction. Experts from the Ministry of Defense, Ministry of Industry and Ethiopian Management Institute were drawn to study the establishment of the commission. In 1991, the commission (renamed Basic Materials and Engineering Industry Commission) was administering four production facilities.

While the number of military production facilities grew, the structure remained unchanged until 2004 when a new body Defense Industry Coordinating Office was created to administer all factories, including those under the Ethiopian National Defense Force. In 2007, the Defense Industry Coordinating Office was renamed Defense Industry Sector and put under the Ministry of Defense.

== Organizations ==
Currently, there are 8 organizations administered by DIS:

- Hibret Machine Tools Engineering Complex
- Gafat Armament Engineering Complex
- Homicho Ammunition Engineering Complex
- Bishoftu Motorization Engineering Complex
- Dejen Aviation Engineering Complex
- Nazareth Canvass and Garment Factory
- Zuqualla Steel Rolling Mill
- Branna Printing Enterprise
