= Bishoftu Automotive Engineering Industry =

Ethiopian arms manufacturing center in Oromia

- ቢሾፍቱ አውቶሞቲቭ ኢንጂነሪንግ ኢንዱስትሪ
- Formation: 1987; 39 years ago
- Type: State-owned enterprise
- Headquarters: Bishoftu, Oromia Region, Ethiopia
- Region served: Ethiopia
- Products: Armaments; Tanks; Military vehicle
- Owner: Defense Engineering Industry Corporation
- Parent organization: Metals and Engineering Corporation
- Subsidiaries: Hibret Manufacturing and Machine Building Industry; Homicho Ammunition Engineering Complex; Gafat Armament Engineering Complex; Dejen Aviation Engineering Industry
- Funding: Government of Ethiopia

Bishoftu Automotive Engineering Industry (Amharic: ቢሾፍቱ አውቶሞቲቭ ኢንጂነሪንግ ኢንዱስትሪ) is an Ethiopian manufacturing and assembly center for heavy armament, tanks and military vehicles. It is one of the organizations of the Ethiopian Defense Industry supporting the Ethiopian National Defense Force.

== History ==
The complex was set up in 1987 as a heavy repair center for tanks and armored vehicles. The Derg regime had plans to eventually produce tanks, armored vehicles, aircraft missiles like air-to-air missiles and SCUD missiles at the complex.

In 2025 the organisation was taken over by the state-run Defense Engineering Industry Corporation, it had previously sat under the civilian-focussed Ethio Engineering Group.

== Operations ==
The Ethiopian government is doing everything to transform the country's economy from its current dependency on rain fed agriculture. Although the country's economy is highly dependent on agriculture it is not farfetched to imagine an Ethiopian economy that is based on manufacturing and modern heavy industries like mining. While the mining Industry is still for most part in the preliminary stage of development the manufacturing sector is off to a good start. One among the few home grown manufacturing sectors is the huge Bishoftu Automotive Industry outside Addis Ababa. The complex is structured in five departments as follows:

- Tanks and armored vehicles manufacturing Rebuild of all tanks and armored vehicles used by Ethiopian forces.
- Military Vehicles manufacturing

Maintaining light and heavy trucks used by the Ethiopian ground forces.

- Motor manufacturing and Mechanical workshop

The department manufacturing engines and produces spare parts for tanks, armored vehicles and military trucks.

- Medium and Heavy weapons manufacturing and electroplating section

Repair and support of supply logistics by repairing and overhauling medium and heavy weapons. The electroplating shop is the largest both in its diversity and capacity in Ethiopia.

- Communications Apparatus manufacturing and Maintenance Section

Repair and maintain various communications apparatuses and electronic equipment in use with the Ethiopian forces.

== Other services ==
In order to fully utilize its capacity and generate income, the center provides services to civilian customers through spare parts supply, electroplating services, and manufacturing machineries for various civilian industries.
