= Hibret Manufacturing and Machine Building Industry =

Ethiopian arms industry

- : ሕብረት ማምረቻ እና የማሽን ግንባታ ኢንዱስትሪ
- Formation: 5 May 1953; 73 years ago
- Type: State-owned enterprise
- Headquarters: Lideta subcity, Addis Ababa, Ethiopia
- Region served: Ethiopia
- Services: Designing, manufacturing, and assembling industrial machinery, metal parts, tools, and automotive components
- Owner: Defense Engineering Industry Corporation
- Key people: Kassahun Hailemariam (2014–2016)
- Parent organization: Metals and Engineering Corporation
- Affiliations: Gafat Armament Engineering Complex; Bishoftu Automotive Engineering Industry; Dejen Aviation Engineering Industry
- Funding: Government of Ethiopia

Hibret Manufacturing and Machine Building Industry (Amharic: ሕብረት ማምረቻ እና የማሽን ግንባታ ኢንዱስትሪ; Hibret mamireti ina yemashini ginibata) is a military-civil engineering complex of the Ethiopian Defense Industry. It specializes in production of Machines and spare parts for the Ethiopian National Defense Force.

== History ==
Hibret Machine tools was established on 5 May 1953 to produce bullets for light weapons under the name Emperor Haile Sellassie I (Amharic: ቀዳማዊ ኃይለ ሥላሴ) Ammunition Factory. In 1984, the Derg regime invested heavily to expand the ammunition production line and create a tools and spare parts production unit.

== Structure ==
Hibret Machine tools were restructured which resulted in its ammunition unit transferred to Homicho Ammunition Engineering Complex and currently is organized as follows:

- Tools and spare parts and medium weapons production unit
- Engraving and pressing products unit
- Metals and product packaging production unit

== Products ==
Military - a variety of mortars

Civilian - hand tools, hospital beds, aluminum saddles, household and office furnitures
