= Michael the Deacon =

16th century Oriental Orthodox deacon

Abba Michael the Deacon
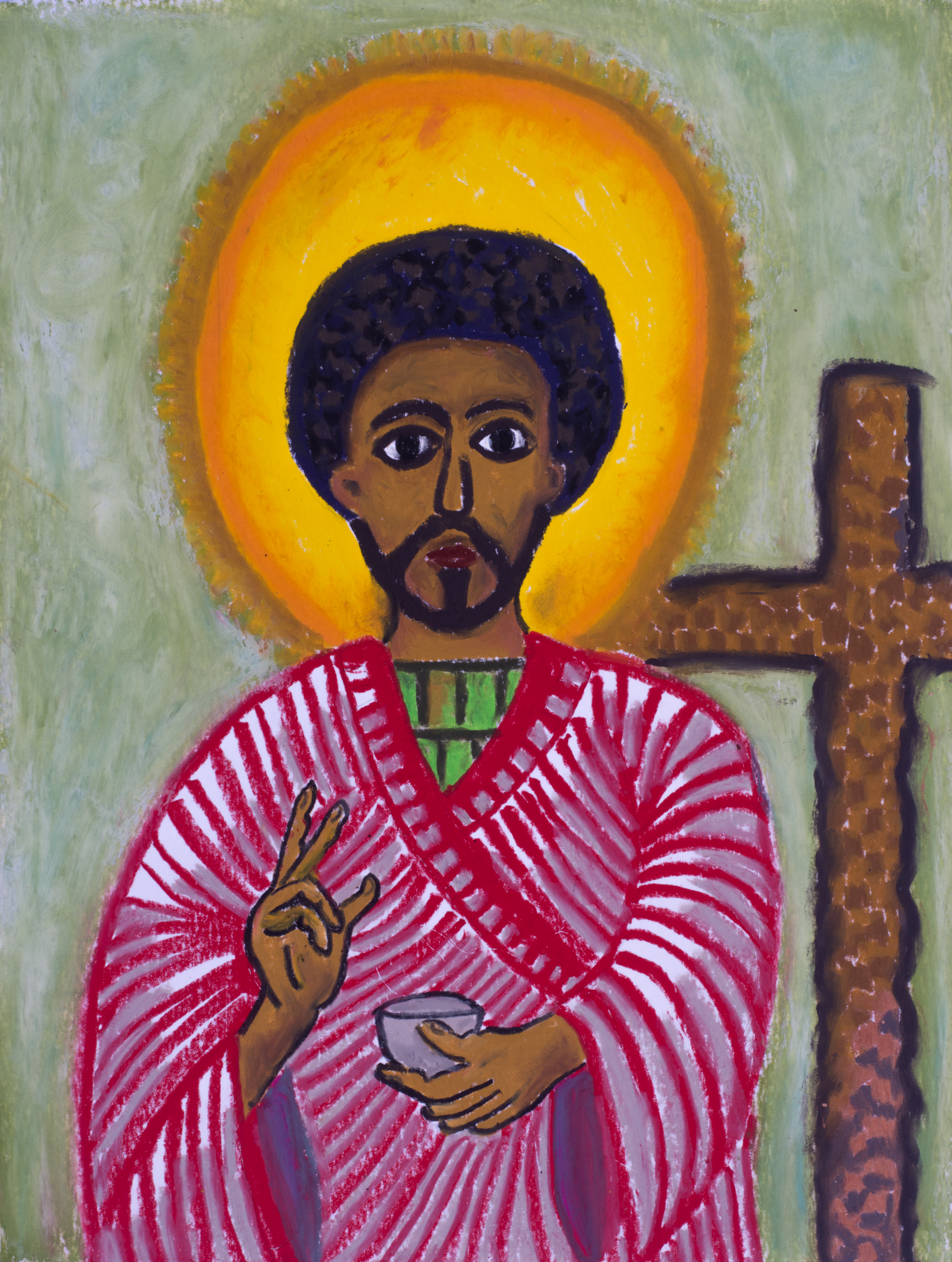
- A portrait of Michael the Deacon, 2018

Personal life
- Born: c. 1500s Ethiopia

Religious life
- Religion: Christianity
- Denomination: Oriental Orthodox
- Profession: Deacon

Mikaʾel (Ge'ez: ሚካኤል), also known as Michael the Deacon, was an Ethiopian Orthodox deacon best known for holding theological discussions with Martin Luther in 1534.

== Biography ==
Stanislau Paulau suggested that Mikaʾel, who was able to speak broken Italian, may be a member of the Ethiopian community based in Santo Stefano degli Abissini in Rome.

A 1534 letter from Philip Melanchthon to Wittenberg lawyer Benedict Pauli describes the meetings between Mikaʾel and Luther. Mikaʾel arrived at Wittenberg on May 31, 1534, and wished to speak to Luther, whom he had heard about. Mikaʾel could speak some Italian, so a German student from the University of Wittenberg who spoke Italian served as an interpreter between the two. Mikaʾel stayed until July 4, and had several further meetings with Luther throughout his stay. They held theological discussions on the doctrine of Trinity and the understanding of the Last Supper. They also compared the Lutheran Mass to the one used by the Ethiopian Orthodox Church, and found that they were in agreement with one another.

Melanchthon wrote of the meetings: "For although the Oriental Church observes some deviant customs, [Abba Mikaʾel] judges that this difference neither annuls the unity of the Church nor contends with the faith, because Christ's kingdom is spiritual righteousness of heart, fear of God, and trust through Christ." In 1537, Luther mentioned the meeting in his table talks. Speaking of the monk from "Mohrenland", Luther recalled that "[Mikaʾel] summed up all our articles [of faith] by saying, 'This is a good credo, that is faith.'" After the meeting, Luther extended fellowship to Mikaʾel and the Ethiopian Church.

Mikaʾel left Wittenberg with a formal letter of recommendation drafted by Melanchthon and signed by Luther. According to Melanchthon, Mikaʾel intended to travel to Strasbourg to meet reformer Martin Bucer, but it is not known if this meeting materialized. While the letter of recommendation enjoyed some circulation shortly after Melanchthon's death, the later works of Gottfried Schütze and Wilhelm Martin Leberecht de Wette misinterpreted Mikaʾel to be a member of the Greek Church and identified him as a "Greek clergyman". This obscured Mikaʾel's identity for much of history until his identity and ethnicity were corrected by the works of Ludwig Enders in 1906.
