= Ethiopian Christmas =

Christmas celebration in Ethiopia

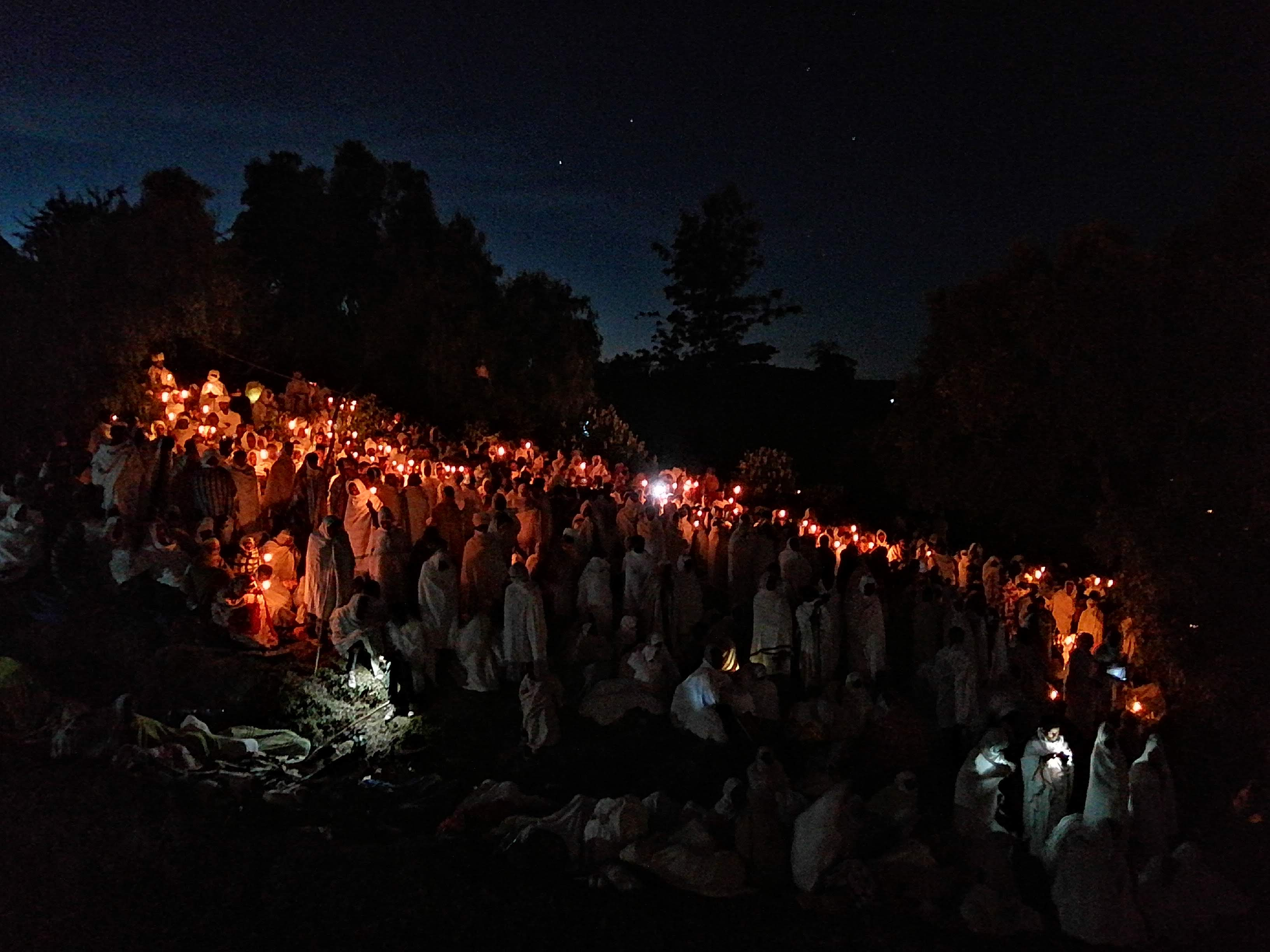
- Vigil lightening at Lalibela during Christmas
- Observed by: Ethiopian Orthodox Tewahedo Church; Eritrean Orthodox Tewahedo Church; Ethiopian Catholic Church; P'ent'ay
- Type: Eastern Christian
- Significance: Birth of Jesus
- Celebrations: Church service; Pilgrimage
- Date: 7 January
- Frequency: Annual
- Related to: Christmas

Ethiopian Christmas (Amharic: ገና (Note: transliterated as Genna or Ganna); Oromo: Ayaana; Tigrinya: ልደት (Note: transliterated as Ledet or Leddat)) is a holiday celebrated by the Ethiopian Orthodox and Eritrean Orthodox churches, as well as Protestant and Catholic denominations in Ethiopia, on 7 January (Tahsas 29 in the Ethiopian calendar).

One of the distinct features of Ethiopian Christmas is a traditional game similar to hockey. The game is believed to have evolved from the shepherds tending their flocks on the night Jesus was born.

== Overview ==
Ethiopian Christmas is celebrated on 7 January (Tahsas 29 in the Ethiopian calendar) as the day of Jesus' birth, alongside the Russian, Greek, Eritrean and Serbian Orthodox Churches. It is also celebrated by Protestant and Catholic denominations in the country.

Ethiopian Orthodox Christians are expected to fast for 43 days, a period known as Tsome Nebiyat or the Fast of the Prophets. Fasting also includes abstaining from all animal products and psychoactive substances, including meat, Alcohol (drug), dairy products, and egg. Starting on 25 November, the fast believed to be "cleansing the body of sin" as they await the birth of Jesus.

== Festivities ==
On Christmas Day, a thin white cotton garment called netela is worn. On the Christmas Eve, Ethiopian Christians attend an overnight church service, usually starting around 6:00pm and finishing at 3:00am. People line up surrounding a church and begin a long, looping procession around the circumference of the church. The festivities are a communal experience and a commitment of faith. The holiday attracts pilgrimages to the Lalibela Churches.

=== Gena ===
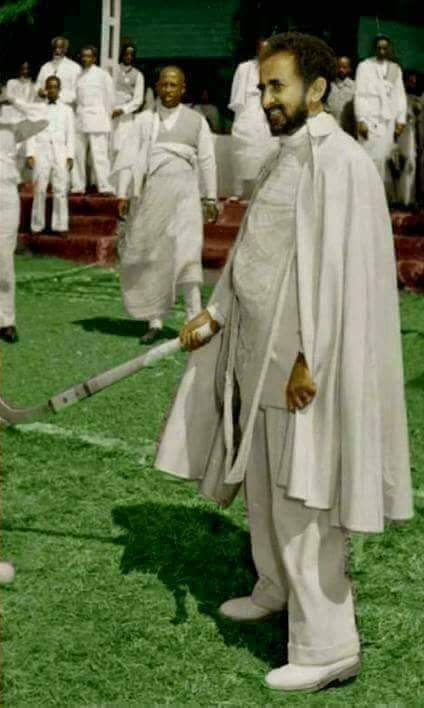
Haile Selassie playing the traditional sport

Gena (ገና) or Qarsa (ቃርሳ) is a traditional field hockey game popular in the Ethiopian Highlands.

Gena is a game played in the space between villages, a field of about 100 yards, but with no defined boundaries. It is played among two teams who attempt to throw a wooden ball in the air and hit it with sticks, the goal being to prevent the opposing team from bringing the ball to their village, or scoring it in your goal.

The game is closely associated with Gena, the January 7 celebration of Christmas, from which it gets its name along with another, rugby-like, sport. Historically, Imperial Ethiopian soldiers acquired proficiency in weapon use from a young age by being trained from childhood with games such as Akandura (Darts) and Gena, which imitated combat. During the 60s and 70s, ye-gena qwas or dula tournaments (along with polo) were played among military divisions in the presence of higher officials whose teams included the "Mechal Club" (4th division "Toreserawit"), Mekuria Club ( 1st division, Kiber Zebenya), Omedla Club (police department / Airforce), Finance Club, and more at Janhoy Meda on the day of Christmas.

== See also ==
- Meskel – Orthodox Tewahedo holiday
- Public holidays in Ethiopia
