= Metals and Engineering Corporation =

Ethiopian arms and machinery industry

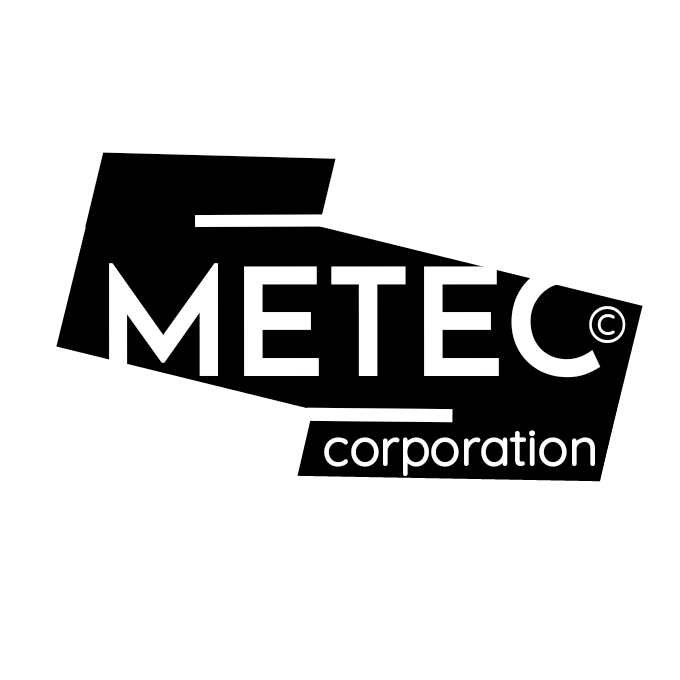
- Native name: ብረታ ብረትና ኢንጂነሪንግ ኮርፖሬሽን
- Type: State-owned enterprise
- Industry: Defence; machinery; automotive; aviation
- Founded: 2010; 16 years ago
- Headquarters: Addis Ababa, Ethiopia
- Area served: Africa and Middle East
- Products: Ammunition; firearms; artillery; agricultural machinery; cars; aircraft
- Revenue: 1.2 billion dollar
- Total assets: 2.13 billion dollar
- Owner: Ethiopian government
- Number of employees: 12,400
- Subsidiaries: Hibret Manufacturing and Machine Building Industry; Homicho Ammunition Engineering Complex; Gafat Armament Engineering Complex; Bishoftu Automotive Engineering Industry; Dejen Aviation Engineering Industry
- Website: www.metec.gov.et

METEC (acronym for Metals and Engineering Corporation) is an Ethiopian arms and machinery industry founded in 2010. It is the state largest military industrial complex, responsible for the production of military equipment and civilian products. METEC works with foreign companies such as Alstom from France, and Spire Corporation from America.

== Controversy ==
=== Grand Ethiopian Renaissance Dam ===
METEC was once responsible for constructing the $4 billion Grand Ethiopian Renaissance Dam project on the River Nile, expected to be Africa's biggest hydroelectric project, but was ousted from the contract in August 2018. Kinfe Dagnew, a Brigadier General in Ethiopia's army and former chief executive of METEC plays a significant role in the organization. The company was assigned development of Grand Ethiopian Renaissance Dam and sugar factory, as well as the Jinka Sugar Bag factory. On 12 November 2018, all assigned project canceled due to fail to complete, and government arrested Kinfe Dagnew, CEO of METEC, after a trial to escape through Sudan, where he was captured by Defence force. Kinfe Dagnew arrived in helicopter to Addis Ababa. Many METEC officials were prosecuted for corruption on the project.

=== Tax evasion ===
In April 2018, Kinfe Dagnew resigned the company after serving for eight years, when Prime Minister Abiy Ahmed became head of the ruling party Ethiopian People's Revolutionary Democratic Front. The company remained unknown when it was operated by TPLF. In June, parliamentary committee found that METEC squandered hundreds of machinery products worth 326.4 million dollars without study of the market.

Sources say that the Commercial Bank of Ethiopia squandered 2.8 million dollars without completion of sugar projects, and revealed the company borrowed 436 million dollars.

=== Kinfe Dagnew arrest ===
On 12 November 2018, the chief executive officer, Kinfe Dagnew was arrested by the Ethiopian National Defense Force after attempting to escape through the Sudan border. He was found with an empty briefcase believed to be illegally transporting goods. Shortly after hours, an Ethiopian Air Force helicopter dispatched from Debrezeit airbase brought Kinfe Dagnew to Addis Ababa. 40 of the company's officials were detained after they called for meeting in Imperial Hotel, Gerji, Addis Ababa. Some newspapers quoted that they were transferred to Addis Ababa Police Commission; then temporarily jailed by Federal Police.
