= Defense Day (Ethiopia) =

National holiday in Ethiopia celebrating on 26 October

Defense Day የመከላከያ ቀን
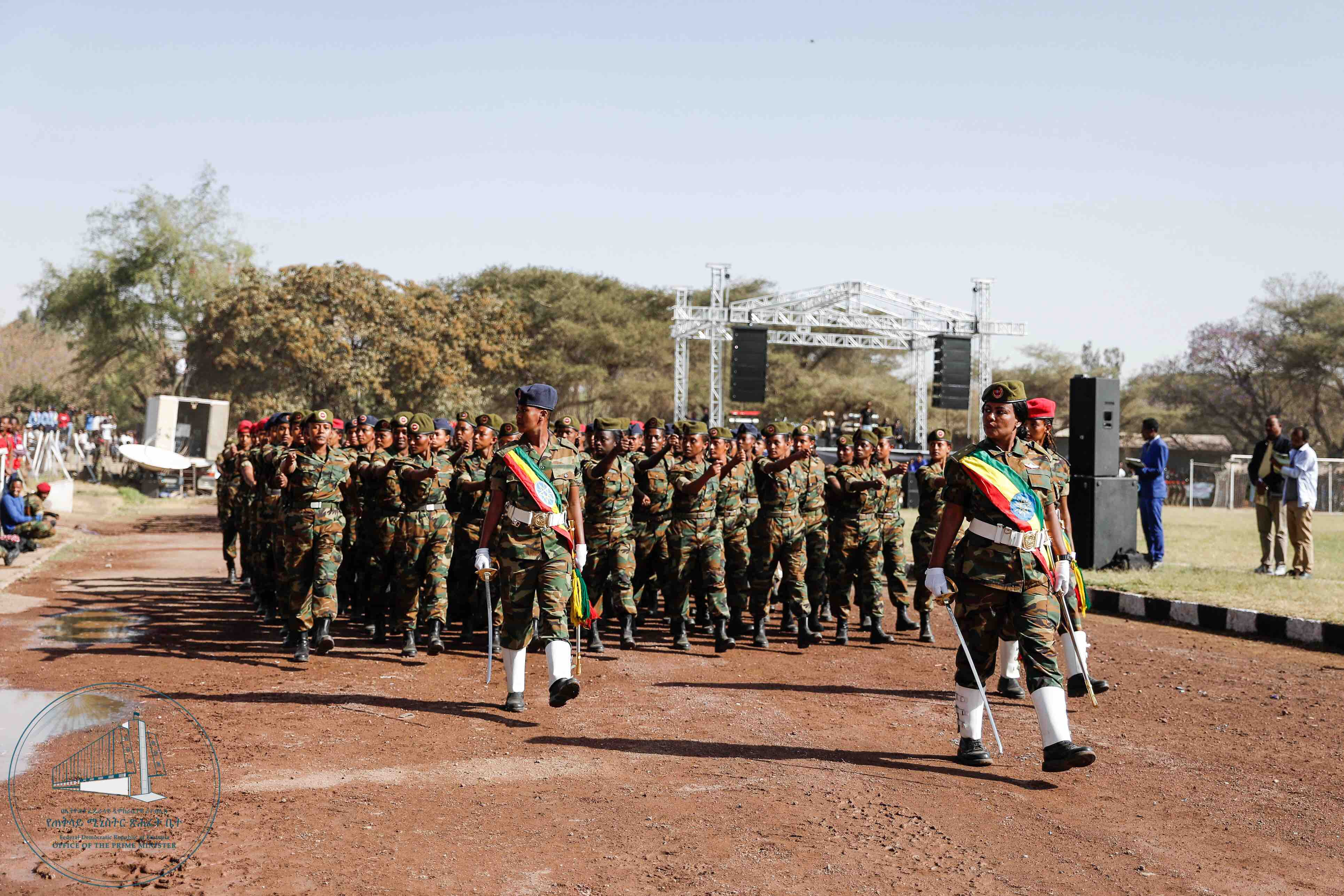
- ENDF soldiers marching in the 2019 parade
- Significance: Formation of the Ethiopian National Defense Force in 1907
- Celebrations: Military parardes; Exhibitions; Maneuvers
- Date: 26 October
- Next time: 26 October 2026
- Frequency: Annual

Defense Day (Amharic: የመከላከያ ቀን) is a national holiday in Ethiopia observed on 26 October to commemorate the establishment of the Ethiopian National Defense Force (ENDF) in 1907. Events in this day includes military parades, exhibitions and other ceremonies.

During the EPRDF-era, Defense Day was celebrated in February due to TPLF relating to the party history. The first day was held on 14 February 2013 under the theme of "Our constitutional loyalty and multi-national nature will be preserved."
