= List of equipment of the Ethiopian Army =

This is a list of equipment used by the Ethiopian Ground Forces.

== Infantry Equipment ==
Gears
Name	Image	Type	Note
PASGT		Combat Helmet	Standard issue.
MICH/FAST		Combat Helmet	Republican Guard only.
M1		Combat Helmet	In Storage
IOTV		Bulletproof vest	Standard issue.

Uniform
Name	Image	Type	Note
Ethiopian Battle Dress Uniform		Combat Uniform	Standard issue from 2020s
M81 Woodland		Combat Uniform	Still in use.
Dress Uniform		Military Uniform	Standard dress uniform.

== Small arms ==
Name	Image	Caliber	Type	Origin	Notes
Pistols
PM		9×18mm	Semi-automatic pistol	Soviet Union	Standard issue pistol
CZ 52		7.62×25mm	Semi-automatic pistol	Czechoslovakia	
Submachine guns
MAB 38		9×19mm	SMG	Italy	
PPS-43		7.62×25mm	SMG	Soviet Union; Poland; China	
Uzi		9×19mm	SMG	Israel	
Shotguns
Schermuly Multi-Purpose Gun		37mm	Riot gun	United Kingdom; Ethiopia	Manufactured locally by Gafat Armament Engineering Complex
Rifles
ET-97/1		7.62×39mm	Assault rifle	Soviet Union; Ethiopia	Manufactured locally by Gafat Armament Engineering Complex
ET-97/2		7.62×39mm	Assault rifle	Soviet Union; Ethiopia	Manufactured locally by Gafat Armament Engineering Complex
KL-133		7.62×39mm	Assault rifle	Russia; Iran; Ethiopia	Manufactured locally by Gafat Armament Engineering Complex
Vz. 58		7.62×39mm	Assault rifle	Czechoslovakia	
Type 56		7.62×39mm	Assault rifle	China	
GAFAT-1		7.62×39mm	Assault rifle	North Korea; Ethiopia	Manufactured locally by Gafat Armament Engineering Complex
IWI Tavor		5.56×45mm	Bullpup; Assault rifle	Israel	
CAR 816		5.56×45mm	Carbine	UAE	Used by the Ethiopian Republican Guard
M14		7.62×51mm	Battle rifle	United States	
Beretta BM 59		7.62×51mm	Battle rifle	Italy	
Heckler & Koch G3		7.62×51mm	Battle rifle	Germany	
FN Model 1949		7.62×51mm	Battle rifle	Belgium	
Vz. 52		7.62×45mm	Semi-automatic rifle	Czechoslovakia	
SKS		7.62×39mm	Semi-automatic rifle	Soviet Union	
Machine guns
Browning M1918; FN Mle 30		.30-06 Springfield; 7.65×53mm	LMG	United States; Belgium	
RP-46		7.62×54mmR	LMG	Soviet Union	
RPD		7.62×39mm	LMG	Soviet Union	
RPK		7.62×39mm	LMG	Soviet Union	
PKM		7.62×54mmR	GPMG	Soviet Union; Ethiopia	Manufactured locally by Gafat Armament Engineering Complex
KPV		14.5×114mm	HMG	Soviet Union	
DShK		12.7×108mm	HMG	Soviet Union	
M2 Browning		.50 BMG	HMG	United States	
Sniper rifles
PSL		7.62×54mmR	DMR; Sniper rifle	Romania	
Grenade launchers
M79		40×46mm	Grenade launcher	United States	
QLZ-87		35×32mm	Automatic grenade launcher	China; Ethiopia	

== Anti-tank weapons ==
=== Anti-tank guided missiles ===
Name	Image	Type	Origin
9M14 Malyutka		Anti-tank weapon	Soviet Union
9K111 Fagot		Anti-tank weapon	Soviet Union
9M133 Kornet		Anti-tank weapon	Russia
BGM-71 TOW		Anti-tank weapon	United States

=== Recoilless rifles ===
Name	Image	Type	Origin	Caliber
B-10		Recoilless rifle	Soviet Union	82mm
B-11		Recoilless rifle	Soviet Union	107mm

=== Rocket propelled grenade launchers ===
Name	Image	Type	Origin	Caliber	Notes
RPG-7		RPG	Soviet Union; Ethiopia	40mm	Manufactured locally by Gafat Armament Engineering Complex

== Vehicles ==
=== Tanks ===
Name	Image	Type	Origin	Quantity	Notes
T-72		MBT	Soviet Union; Ukraine	221	50 T-72B (bought from Yemen), 171 T-72UA1
T-54/T-55		MBT	Soviet Union; Israel	240	T-54A; T-55A; T-55MB; Tiran-5
T-62		MBT	Soviet Union	Unknown	

=== Reconnaissance ===
Name	Image	Type	Origin	Quantity	Notes
Cadillac V-150		Armored car	United States	12	
Ze'ev		Armored car	Israel; Ethiopia	369	

=== Infantry fighting vehicles ===
Name	Image	Type	Origin	Quantity	Notes
BMP-1		IFV	Soviet Union	20	

=== Scout cars ===
Name	Image	Type	Origin	Quantity	Notes
BRDM-1		Amphibious armored scout car	Soviet Union	30	
BRDM-2		Amphibious armored scout car	Soviet Union	40	

=== Armored personnel carriers ===
Name	Image	Type	Origin	Quantity	Notes
BTR-60		APC	Soviet Union	100	
Type 92		APC	China	80	
WZ-523		APC	China	20	
ZSD-89		APC	China	10	
ACMAT Bastion		APC	France	12	
Gaia Thunder		IMV	Israel	75	
Calidus MCAV-20		IMV	UAE	100+	

=== Mine-Resistant Ambush Protected ===
Name	Image	Type	Origin	Quantity	Notes
KamAZ-53949 Typhoon-K		MRAP	Russia	238(on order)	

=== Engineering vehicles ===
Name	Image	Type	Origin	Quantity	Notes
VT-55A		ARV	Soviet Union; Czechoslovakia	Unknown	
BTS-5B		ARV	Ukraine	64	
Bozena-5		Mine clearing vehicle	Slovakia	Unknown	

=== Armoured vehicle-launched bridges ===
Name	Image	Type	Origin	Quantity	Notes
MTU-12		AVLB	Soviet Union	Unknown	
GQL-111		AVLB	China	Unknown	

=== Utility vehicles ===
Name	Image	Type	Origin	Quantity	Notes
M151		Utility vehicle	United States	Unknown	
Toyota Land Cruiser		Utility vehicle	Japan	Unknown	
Trucks
Ural-375		Utility truck	Soviet Union	Unknown	
Ural-4320		Utility truck	Soviet Union	Unknown	
M39		Utility truck	United States	Unknown	
M809		Utility truck	United States	Unknown	
Mercedes-Benz Actros		Tractor unit	Germany	Unknown	

== Artillery ==
Name	Image	Type	Origin	Quantity	Notes
Tactical ballistic missile
DF-12/M20		Tactical ballistic missile	China	Unknown	Ethiopia had already purchased and received the Dongfeng-12 (DF-12) missile system, also known as the export version of the M20 ballistic missile, around the 2010s. Seen in use on Tigray war
Self-propelled artillery
2S1 Gvozdika		Self-propelled artillery	Soviet Union	82	
2S19 Msta-S		Self-propelled artillery	Soviet Union	10	
PLZ-45		Self-propelled artillery	China	18	Delivered in 1999
SH-15		Self-propelled artillery	China	32	
Rocket artillery
BM-21 Grad		MLRS	Soviet Union	50	
Type 63		MRL	China; Ethiopia	25	Manufactured modernization by Gafat Armament Engineering Complex
PHL-03		MLRS	China	4	
Mortars
BM-37		Mortar	Soviet Union	Unknown	
M1		Mortar	United States	Unknown	
M19		Mortar	United States	Unknown	
M29		Mortar	United States	Unknown	
M30		Mortar	United States	Unknown	
Field artillery
Type 56		Field gun	Soviet Union; China	Unknown	
M-46		Field gun	Soviet Union; Ethiopia	Unknown	Manufactured modernization by Gafat Armament Engineering Complex
M-30		Howitzer	Soviet Union	464	
2A18 D-30		Howitzer	Soviet Union; Ethiopia	309	Manufactured modernization by Gafat Armament Engineering Complex

== Air defense ==
=== Man-portable air-defense systems ===
Name	Image	Type	Origin	Quantity	Notes
9K32 Strela-2		MANPADS	Soviet Union		
9K38 Igla		MANPADS	Soviet Union		

=== Towed anti-aircraft guns ===
Name	Image	Type	Origin	Quantity	Notes
ZPU		Anti-aircraft gun	Soviet Union	Unknown	
ZU-23-2		Autocannon	Soviet Union; Ethiopia	Unknown	Locally manafactured by Gafat Armament Engineering Complex
61-K		Autocannon	Soviet Union	Unknown	
S-60		Autocannon	Soviet Union	Unknown	

=== Self-propelled anti-aircraft guns ===
Name	Image	Type	Origin	Quantity	Notes
ZSU-23-4 Shilka		SPAAG	Soviet Union	60	

=== Surface-to-air missile systems ===
Name	Image	Type	Origin	Quantity	Notes
S-75M3 Volkhov		SAM	Soviet Union	89	1st division
S-125M1 Pechora-M1		SAM	Soviet Union	4	1st division
Pantsir-S1		SAM	Russia	6	
HQ-64		SAM	China	12	
SPYDER		SAM	Israel	26	
S-400		SAM	Russia	4	4 batteries on order.

== Electronic warfare ==
Name	Image	Type	Origin	Quantity	Notes
Kolchuga-M		Electronic warfare	Soviet Union; Ukraine	8	
1RL257E Krasukha-4		Electronic warfare	Russia	Unknown	Delivered by Russia in 2023

== Radar vehicles ==
Name	Image	Type	Origin	Quantity	Notes
P-18		Radar	Soviet Union	12	
ST-68U		Radar	Soviet Union	13	

== Historical equipment ==
=== Sidearms ===
- Germany: Mauser C96
- Czechoslovakia: ČZ vz. 27 5,000 units

=== Rifles ===
- Austria-Hungary: M1867 Werndl–Holub
- Austria-Hungary: Mannlicher M1888
- Austria-Hungary: Mannlicher M1890
- Austria-Hungary: Mannlicher M1895
- Russia: Berdan rifle 30,000 units
- Russia: Mosin-Nagant
- Switzerland: M1870 Italian Vetterli 14,000 units
- Germany: Mauser Model 1871
- Germany: Gewehr 98
- Germany: Karabiner 98k
- France: Fusil Gras mle 1874
- Italy: Carcano
- United Kingdom: Martini–Henry
- United Kingdom: Lee-Metford
- United Kingdom: Lee-Enfield
- United Kingdom: Pattern 1914 Enfield
- Belgium: FN Model 24 and Model 30
- United States: M1903 Springfield
- United States: M1917 Enfield
- United States: M1 Garand 20,700 units
- United States: M1 Carbine 16,417 units
- Czechoslovakia: ZH-29 100 units
- Yugoslavia: Zastava M48
- Yugoslavia: Zastava M59/66
- China: Type 63

=== Submachine gun ===
- Italy: Beretta M1918
- Italy: OVP 1918
- Austria: MP 34
- Germany: MP35
- United States: M1928A1/M1 Thompson
- Soviet Union: PPSh-41

=== Machine guns ===
- Denmark: Madsen
- France: Hotchkiss Mle 1914
- United States: M1917 Browning
- Italy: Breda M37
- Czechoslovakia: ZB vz. 26
- Czechoslovakia: ZB vz. 30 450 units
- Switzerland: SIG KE7

=== Anti tank weapons ===
- United States: M18 recoilless rifle
- United States: M20 recoilless rifle

=== Tanks ===
- Italy: 5 Fiat 3000
- Czechoslovakia: 20 AH-IV
- United States: 34 M24 Chaffee
- United States: 54 M41 Walker Bulldog
- United States: 30 M47 Patton
- United States: 24 M60A1
- Soviet Union: 56 T-34
- North Korea: Chonma-ho

=== Tankettes ===
- Italy: 18 L3/35

=== Infantry fighting vehicles ===
- Soviet Union: 35 BMD-1

=== Armored personnel carriers ===
- United States: 20 M8 Greyhound
- United States: 120 M59
- United States: 90 M113A1
- Soviet Union: BTR-152
- Soviet Union: 100 BTR-40
- Soviet Union: 37 BTR-80

=== Self-propelled artillery ===
- United States: 12 M109
- Soviet Union: 10 2S5 Giatsint-S

=== Field artillery ===
- France: Mle 1897
- Germany: 12 Pak 36
- United States: M116
- United States: M101
- United States: 12 M114
- Italy: 2 OTO Melara Mod 56
- Soviet Union: ZiS-3
- Soviet Union: BS-3
- Soviet Union: 50 2A29 T-12
- Soviet Union: 20 D-20

=== Mortars ===
- United States: M2
- United States: M2 4.2
- United Kingdom: ML 4.2

=== Multiple rocket launchers ===
- Soviet Union: BMD-20

=== Anti-aircraft artillery ===
- Soviet Union: 10 ZSU-57-2

=== Surface-to-air missile systems ===
- Soviet Union: 2K12 Kub
- Soviet Union: 9K31 Strela-1
