= Homicho Ammunition Engineering Complex =

Ethiopian arms industry

- ሆሚቾ ጥይት ኢንጂነሪንግ ኮምፕሌክስ
- Formation: 1987; 39 years ago
- Type: State-owned enterprise
- Headquarters: Ambo, Oromia Region, Ethiopia
- Region served: Ethiopia
- Owner: Defense Engineering Industry Corporation
- Parent organization: Metals and Engineering Corporation
- Affiliations: Hibret Manufacturing and Machine Building Industry; Gafat Armament Engineering Complex; Bishoftu Automotive Engineering Industry; Dejen Aviation Engineering Industry
- Funding: Government of Ethiopia
- Staff: ~1,480 (~1,288 civil personnel)
- Formerly called: Tatek Engineering Factory

Homicho Ammunition Engineering Complex (Amharic: ሆሚቾ ጥይት ኢንጂነሪንግ ኮምፕሌክስ) is the part of Metals and Engineering Corporation and is also one of the military production facilities of the Ethiopian Defense Industry Sector. It specializes in producing wide range of ammunition for use by the Ethiopian National Defense Force.

== History ==
The Complex was established around 1987 under the name Tatek Engineering Factory with the goal of producing ammunition for medium and heavy weapons. It initially produced mortar shells but was later greatly expanded to produce a wide range of ammunition. In addition, the light weapons ammunition production line was transferred from Hibret Machine Tools Engineering Complex in a restructuring to house all ammunition production under one organization. The new organization was renamed Homicho Ammunition Engineering Complex in 2004. It was built by previous governments of Ethiopia and is not linked with the new Abiy Ahmed.

== Structure ==
The complex has four departments with 1,480 personnel out of which 192 of them are military and 1,288 are civil.

== Research and development ==
The complex collaborates closely with the Defense Engineering College and various higher learning institutes. It has undertaken various works to improve the quality of military ammunition.

== Products ==
The center produces wide range of ammunition ranging from light weapons to heavy mortars and artillery. It also produces various metal products that are inputs to civil industries.
