= Public holidays in Ethiopia =

The following lists are public holidays in Ethiopia. Many holidays follow the Ethiopian Orthodox Tewahedo Church.

== National holidays ==
Date	English name	Amharic name	Notes
2 March	Adwa Victory Day	የዓድዋ ድል በዓል	Commemorates Ethiopia’s victory over Italy at the Battle of Adwa in 1896.
1 May	International Workers' Day	ዓለም አቀፍ የሠራተኞች ቀን	
5 May	Ethiopian Patriots' Victory Day	የአርበኞች ቀን	Commemorates the 1941 entering of Emperor Haile Selassie into Addis Ababa amidst Second World War, who returned to the throne after 5 years of Italian occupation of Ethiopia following the Second Italo-Ethiopian War.
28 May	Downfall of the Derg	ደርግ የወደቀበት ቀን	Commemorates the end of the Derg junta in 1991. It is also known as Ginbot 20 (ግንቦት 20).
11 September (Leap year: 12 September)	Enkutatash	እንቁጣጣሽ/የዘመን መለወጫ/አዲስ አመት	New Year of Ethiopia and Eritrea

== Religious holidays ==
=== Ethiopian Orthodox Tewahedo Church holidays ===
Orthodox Church calendar date	English name	Amharic name	Oromoo name
7 January	Ethiopian Christmas	Genna (ልደተ-ለእግዚእነ/ ገና)	Ayaana Qillee
19 January (Leap year: 20 January)	Epiphany	Timkat (ብርሃነ ጥምቀት)	Ayaana Cuuphaa
Moveable in spring	Good Friday	Siklet (ስቅለት)	Ayyaana Faannoo
Moveable in spring	Easter	Fasika (ብርሃነ-ትንሣኤ/ፋሲካ)	Ayyaana Faasiikaa
27 September; 28 September (leap year)	Meskel	መስቀል	Masqalaa

=== Islamic holidays ===
In addition, the following Muslim holidays, which may take place at any time of the year, are observed as public holidays:

Islamic calendar date	English name	Amharic name	Notes
Moveable	Ramadan	Ramadaan	Ninth month, devoted to fasting
12 Rabi' al-awwal (Sunni); 17 Rabi' al-awwal (Shia)	Mawlid	Mawliid	Birth of the Prophet
1 Shawwal	Eid al-Fitr	Iid al-Fitrii	Breaking of the Fast
10 Dhu al-Hijjah	Eid al-Adha	Iid al-Adhaa	Feast of the Sacrifice

== Holidays under the Derg communist rule (1974–1991) ==
Date	English name	Amharic name	Oromo name	Notes
12 September	Revolution Day	የአብዮት ቀን	Guyyaa warraaqsa	Celebrated during Communist rule from 1974 to 1991 to celebrate the establishment of the Derg. In 1987, the celebrations of the holiday, which included a military parade on Revolution Square attended by multiple figures, also commemorated the establishment of the People's Democratic Republic of Ethiopia.
26 October	Defense Day	የመከላከያ ቀን	Guyyaa Ittisaa	Commemorating the establishment of the Ethiopian National Defense Force in 1907
7 November	October Revolution Day	የጥቅምት አብዮት ቀን	Guyyaa warraaqsa Onkolooleessaa	Celebrated during Communist rule from 1974 to 1991.

== See also ==
- Sigd
