= Gafat Armament Engineering Complex =

Ethiopian arms industry

- ጋፋት የጦር መሣሪያዎች ኢንጂነሪንግ ኮምፕሌክስ
- Formation: January 1986; 40 years ago
- Type: State-owned enterprise
- Location: Bishoftu, Oromia Region, Ethiopia
- Region served: Ethiopia
- Products: Ak-47, PK machine guns
- Owner: Defense Engineering Industry Corporation
- Representative: Lt.Col Asmeret Kidane
- Parent organization: Metals and Engineering Corporation
- Affiliations: Hibret Manufacturing and Machine Building Industry; Homicho Ammunition Engineering Complex; Bishoftu Automotive Engineering Industry; Dejen Aviation Engineering Industry
- Funding: Government of Ethiopia
- Formerly called: Gafat Engineering Factory

Gafat Armament Engineering Complex (Amharic: ጋፋት የጦር መሣሪያዎች ኢንጂነሪንግ ኮምፕሌክስ; GAEC) is an Ethiopian arms industry and one of the military production facilities of the Metals and Engineering Corporation. With its headquarters in Bishoftu, it specializes in producing wide range of infantry equipment that meet the requirement of the Ethiopian National Defense Force.

== History ==
It was established in January 1986 as the Gafat Engineering Factory to fulfill the need for local manufacture of basic infantry equipment. It initially produced AK-47 automatic rifles and light machine guns, as well as maintenance. It was later expanded to manufacture PK machine guns, and automatic weapons attached on armoured vehicles and helicopters.

To fully utilize its manufacturing capacity, the complex has diversified by supplying various items for civilian use.

It is often believed that North Korean advisors assisted with manufacturing of small arms.

== Products ==
Military products include: various types of automatic rifles and machine guns; 40 mm grenade launchers; various types of guns such as hand guns, strike dispensing guns, etc.; and sniper scopes.

Civilian products include: various plastic products; various products for different industries in construction; and various kitchen wares and household utensils.

== See also ==
- Gafat people, an extinct ethnic group that historically provided military support to the Ethiopian Solomonic dynasty
- Sebastopol, a cannon produced in the Gafat foundry northeast of Debre Tabor, set up by Tewodros II to manufacture modern arms
