= Dejen Aviation Engineering Industry =

Military aircraft maintenance facility

- ደጀን አቬሽን ኢንጂነሪንግ
- Formation: 1980s
- Type: State-owned enterprise
- Headquarters: Bishoftu, Ethiopia
- Region served: Ethiopia
- Services: Maintenance, upgrading/modification to the fleet of the Ethiopian Air Force
- Owner: Defense Engineering Industry Corporation
- Parent organization: Metals and Engineering Corporation
- Affiliations: Hibret Manufacturing and Machine Building Industry; Homicho Ammunition Engineering Complex; Gafat Armament Engineering Complex; Bishoftu Automotive Engineering Industry
- Funding: Government of Ethiopia

Dejen Aviation Engineering Industry (Amharic: ደጀን አቬሽን ኢንጂነሪንግ; DAVI) is an Ethiopian arms industry and part of Metals and Engineering Corporation. It is the center for overhauling and upgrading military aircraft. Its primary objective is to provide depot level maintenance and carry out upgrading/modification to the fleet of the Ethiopian Air Force. It is one of the Defense organizations of the Ethiopian Defense Industry under the Ministry of Defense.

== History ==
The aircraft overhauling center was started in mid-1980s as a project under the name Aircraft Heavy Maintenance Center to overhaul MiG-21 and MiG-23 aircraft of the Ethiopian Air Force. The center was intended to have a capacity for overhauling 50 aircraft annually. It never reached full capability by the time the civil war ended in 1991.

In 1995, the transitional government started reevaluating the project. A team was formed from different organizations and the scope of the center was enlarged to include overhaul of helicopters and transports in addition to fighters as well as carry out upgrade/modification work. The project was implemented in phases and the center was formally inaugurated in 2004.

== Operations ==
DAVI has capability to overhaul and repair the following aircraft types and their systems:

- Combat aircraft: MiG-21, MiG-23 fighters, L-39 jet trainer
- Transport and Attack helicopters: Mi-8, Mi-17, Mi-24, Mi-35
- Transport and Light Aircraft: Antonov 12 and various light aircraft

In addition, the complex carries out:

- Manufacture of various aircraft bodies, military and civil boats from fiber glass and composite materials.
- Manufacture of aircraft parts and accessories
- Manufacture of rubber parts for aircraft and other services
- Production of plexi glass for aircraft and helicopters
- More than nine electro-plating services

It was reported in December 2008, DAVI has started manufacturing steel structures and fiber glass for construction of green house to support the fast-growing horticulture sector in Ethiopia.
