= Kidase =

Church service of the Ethiopian and Eritrean Orthodox Tewahedo Church

Kidase (Ge'ez: ቅዳሴ, means "thanksgiving to the Lord") is an Orthodox Tewahedo daily worship service originated by the sixth century Aksumite composer Saint Yared hymnary works. The word "Kidase" means thanksgiving to the Lord by mankind and angels alike, which has a purpose of converting the wine and bread into the Holy Sacrament (the blood and body of Jesus Christ), as this day is eve of Jesus crucifixion.

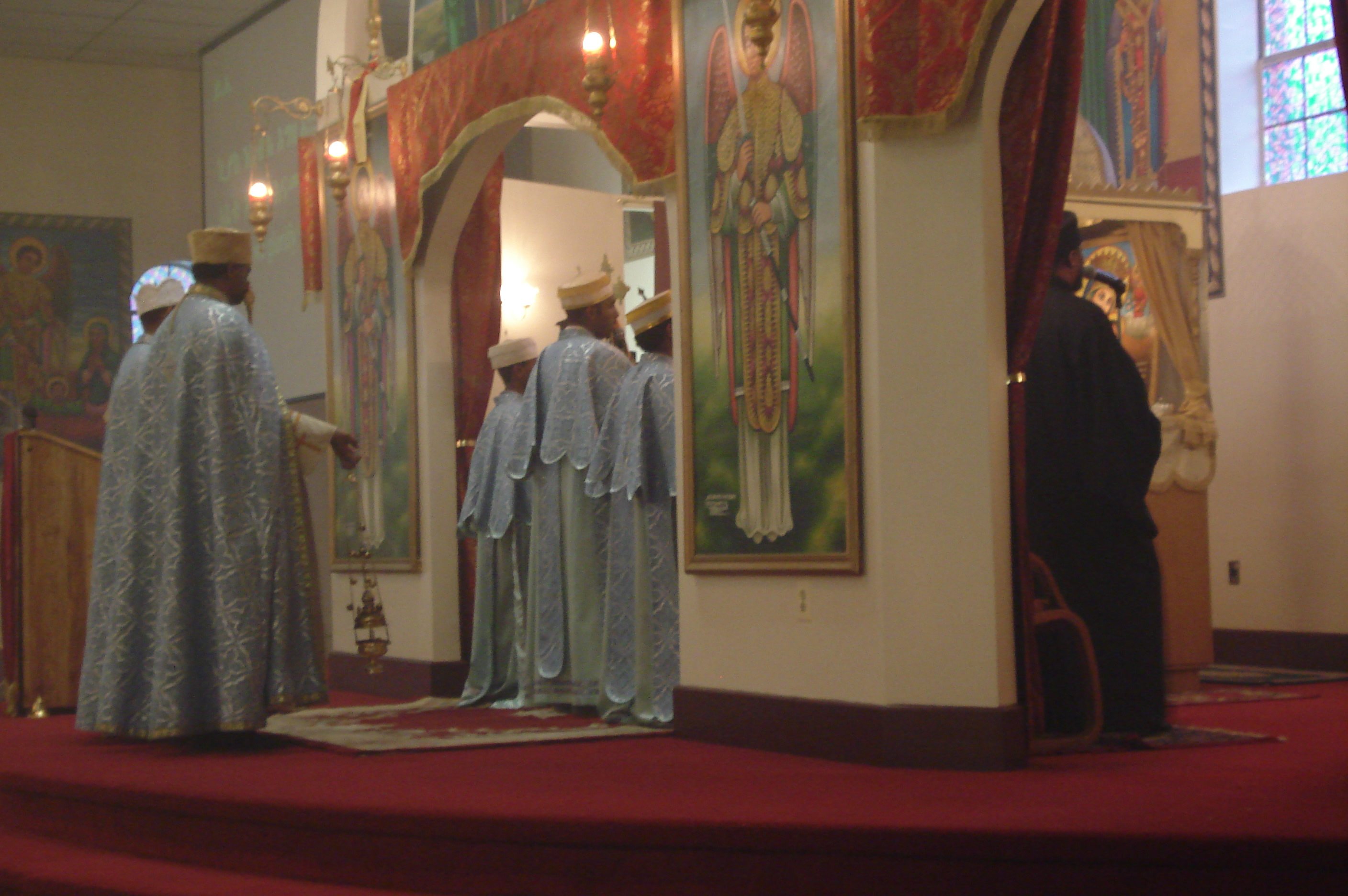
Priests and deacons conducting Kidase at St. Michael Church in Washington D.C. on 8 March 2009

== Course ==
This church service is ruled by the book of Kidase, which is divided into three sections by role of clergymen:

1. The prayer of the Priest

2. The prayer of the Deacon

3. The prayer of the People

Priests chant and pray by reading the book, the congregants in a church follow their word like participants in praising the Lord, and deacons reads, chants, and instructs the people. All people regardless of sex and age obliged to participate to this service.
