= Hardship post =

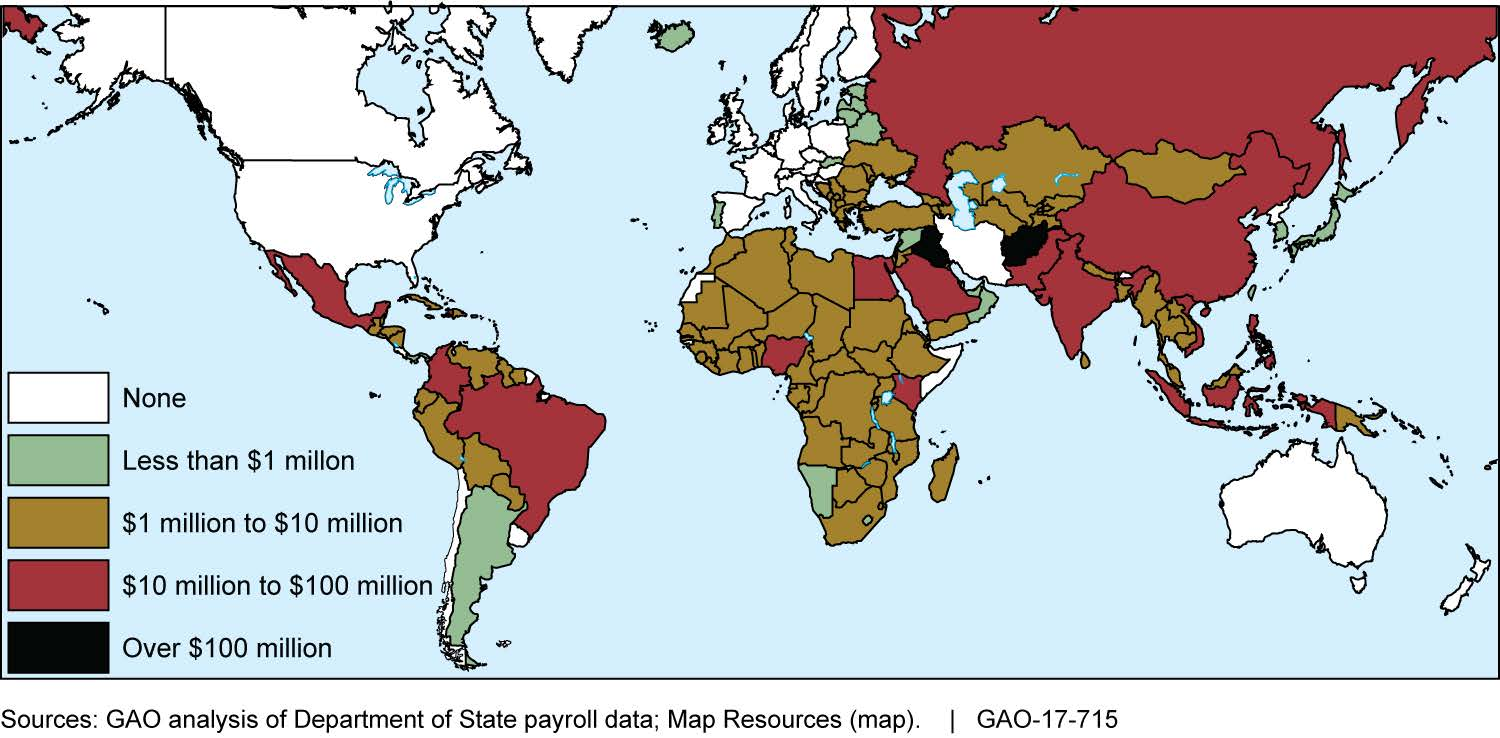
US State Department hardship and danger payments by country, 2011–2016

In the terminology of the United States Diplomatic Service, a hardship post is a diplomatic post where living conditions are difficult due to climate, crime, health care, pollution or other factors. Employees assigned to such posts receive a hardship differential of between 10 and 35 percent of their salary. A hardship post with security issues, for example in a war zone, may also be a designated hardship post with employees eligible for additional danger pay.

The U.S. Department of State's Office of Allowances in the Bureau of Administration regularly maintains and updates the hardship differential rates for U.S. diplomatic missions around the world.
