= Ethiopian National Defense Force =

Combined military force of Ethiopia

- የኢፌዲሪ መከላከያ ሰራዊት (Amharic)
- Emblem of the Ethiopian National Defense Force

- Flag of the Ethiopian National Defense Force
- Founded: 26 October 1907; 119 years ago
- Current form: 1996
- Service branches: Ethiopian Army; Ethiopian Navy; Ethiopian Air Force
- Headquarters: Addis Ababa, Ethiopia

Leadership
- Commander-in-Chief: Taye Atske Selassie
- Prime Minister: Abiy Ahmed Ali
- Minister of Defense: Aisha Mohammed
- Chief of General Staff: Field Marshal Birhanu Jula

Personnel
- Military age: 18 years old
- Conscription: None
- Active personnel: 162,000 (2026)

Expenditure
- Budget: 81 billion birr (US$495.67 million) (2025-26)
- Percent of GDP: 0.42% (2025-26)

Industry
- Domestic suppliers: Defense Industry Sector
- Foreign suppliers: Historical: Czechoslovakia; East Germany; North Korea; Yugoslavia; Hungary; USSR; Modern: Israel France Russia Turkey Iran India China South Africa United Arab Emirates

Related articles
- History: See list: Gugsa Wale's rebellion; Second Italo-Ethiopian War; World War II; Korean War; United Nations Operation in the Congo; Eritrean War of Independence; 1964 Ethiopian–Somali Border War; Nigerian Civil War; Oromo conflict; Ethiopian Civil War; Rhodesian Bush War; Ogaden War; 1982 Ethiopian–Somali Border War; United Nations Assistance Mission for Rwanda; Eritrean–Ethiopian War; Somalia War (2006–2009); 2007–2008 Ethiopian crackdown in Ogaden; OLA insurgency; Ethiopian civil conflict (2018–present); Tigray War; 2022 al-Shabaab invasion of Ethiopia; War in Amhara
- Ranks: Military ranks of Ethiopia

The Ethiopian National Defense Force (ENDF; Amharic: የኢፌዴሪ መከላከያ ሰራዊት, romanized: Ye'īfēdērī mekelakeya šerawīt, lit. 'FDRE Defense Force') are the combined military forces of Ethiopia. The ENDF consists of 8 command forces which are controlled by the Defense Commanders Council that is chaired by the Chief of General Staff.

== Strategic Commanders ==
Strategic commanders are senior military leaders responsible for planning and directing a country’s overall defense strategy, coordinating large-scale operations and commanding the entire security forces in Ethiopia.

Commander in Chief – Taye Atske Selassie

Prime Minister – Abiy Ahmed Ali

Chief of the General Staff – Field Marshal Birhanu Jula Gelelcha

Deputy Chief of the General Staff – General Abebaw Taddese Asres

Notable High Commanders –

All of the commanders listed below are members of the Defense Council and are strategic commanders of Ethiopia's Defense Force.
- General Getachew Gudina Selbana- Chief of the intelligence of the Army
- General Alemshet Degife Balcha- Advisor of the CDF and Chief of the Shooting Management
- Lieutenant General Solomon Etefa- Chief Commander of South Command
- Lieutenant General Mesele Meseret Tegegn- Chief Commander of the Western Command
- Lieutenant General Shuma Abdeta Hika- Chief Commander of the Commando and Airborne Command
- Lieutenant General Mohammed Tesema- Chief Commander of the Eastern Command
- Lieutenant General Asefa Chekol- Chief Commander of the Northeast Command
- Lieutenant General Yilma Merdassa Napa- Chief Commander of the Ethiopian Airforce
- Lieutenant General Abdurahman Ismael Alo- Commander of Head of Logistics
- Lieutenant General Zewdu Belay Malefya- Chief Commander of Central Command
- Lieutenant General Birhanu Bekele Bedada- Chief Commander of Northwest Command
- Lieutenant General Hachaalu Sheleme Merga- Commander of Head of Human resource
- Lieutenant General Desalegn Teshome Abitew- Inspector General
- Lieutenant General Desta Abiche- Commander of Head of Engineer Corps
- Major General Kefyalew Amde- Chief Commander of the Mechanised command
- Major General Birhanu Tilahun- Chief Commander of the 6th Command
- Major General Admasu Alemu- Chief Commander of the 11th Command
- Rear Admiral Kindu Gezu- Chief of the Navy Force

== Highest award ==
The Adwa Heroes High Medal and the Black Lion Heroes High Medal are the two highest awards presented by President of Federal Democratic Republic of Ethiopia and the prime minister of the Federal Democratic Republic of Ethiopia (Government of Ethiopia). They are awarded for contributions to the country.

The Black Lion award is presented to

- Field Marshal Birhanu Jula Gelelcha

- General Abebaw Taddesse Asres

- General Bacha Debele Buta

- Lieutenant General Alemshet Degife Balcha by the President of Ethiopia and Prime Minister of Ethiopia (Government of Ethiopia) on Jan 9, 2022 for their achievements during the war in Tigray.

The Adwa Heroes medal is presented to

- General Getachew Gudina Selbana

- Lieutenant General Zewdu Belay Malefya

- Lieutenant General Solomon Etefa Lemu

- Lieutenant General Mesele Meseret Tegegn

- Lieutenant General Yilma Merdassa Napa

- Lieutenant General Abdurahman Ismael Alo

- Lieutenant General Shuma Abdeta Hika

- Lieutenant General Belay Seyoum Akele by the President of Ethiopia and the Prime Minister of Ethiopia (Government of Ethiopia) on Jan 9, 2022, for their achievements during the Tigray War.

== Defense Commanders Council ==
The Defense Commanders Council have the following powers and functions-

1, Discusses and makes decisions on operational and strategic plans and the organization of the army.

2, Provides opinion on the budget allocation of the army.

3, The council will present and discusses on the candidates for the rank of Brigadier General.

4, Discusses on the performance of officers nominated for the rank of Lieutenant Colonel and Colonel and approves the promotion.

5, Consults the Chief of the General staff regarding members nominated to Major General and the council may give opinion on the nomination Lieutenant General.

6, Provides advice on the dismissal of Lieutenant Colonel and Colonel who is dismissed before reaching retirement age due to incapacity, structural changes, operational improvements.

7, Discusses with the Chief of the General Staff on military matters.

Members of the Defense Commanders Council are -

1, Chief of the General Staff (Chair)

2, Deputy Chief of the General Staff (Member)

3, Force Chief Commanders (Members)

4, Command Chief Commanders (Members)

5, Heads of Main Department (Members)

6, Inspector General (Member)

== History ==
Ethiopian is the only uncolonized country in Africa. The Ethiopian army's origins and military traditions date back to the earliest history of Ethiopia. Due to Ethiopia's location between the Middle East and Africa, it has long been in the middle of Eastern and Western politics and has been subject to foreign invasion and aggression. In 1579, the Ottoman Empire's attempt to expand from a coastal base at Massawa during the Ottoman conquest of Habesh was defeated. The Army of the Ethiopian Empire was also able to defeat the Egyptians in 1876 at Gura, led by Ethiopian Emperor Yohannes IV. Clapham wrote in the 1980s that the "Abyssinians [had suffered] from a 'superiority complex' which may be traced to Gundet, Gura and Adwa".

Following the order of the emperor of Ethiopia, Russian explorer Nikolay Leontiev directly organized the first battalion of the regular Ethiopian army in February 1899. Leontiev formed the first regular battalion, the kernel of which became the company of volunteers from the former Senegal shooters, which he chose and invited from Western Africa, with the training of the Russian and French officers. The first Ethiopian military band was organized at the same time.

=== Ethiopian Empire ===
==== Battle of Adwa ====
The Battle of Adwa is the best-known victory of Ethiopian forces over foreign invaders. It maintained Ethiopia's existence as an independent state. Fought on 1 March 1896 against the Kingdom of Italy near the town of Adwa, it was the decisive battle of the First Italo–Ethiopian War. Assisted by all of the major nobles of Ethiopia, including Tekle Haymanot of Gojjam, Ras Makonnen, Ras Mengesha Yohannes, Mikael of Wollo, and Menelik II struck a powerful blow against the Italian army.

==== Preserving Ethiopian independence ====
During the Scramble for Africa, Ethiopia remained the only nation that had not been colonized by European colonial powers, due in part to their defeat of Italy in the First Italo-Ethiopian War. However, with Ethiopia surrounded by European colonies, the necessity of ensuring that the Ethiopian army was well-maintained became apparent to the Ethiopian government. The Ethiopian government trained its troops to a very high degree, with Imperial Russian Army officer Alexander Bulatovich writing thus:

"Many consider the Ethiopian army to be undisciplined. They think that it is not in any condition to withstand a serious fight with a well-organized European army, claiming that the recent war with Italy doesn't prove anything. I will not begin to guess the future and will say only this. Over the course of four months, I watched this army closely. It is unique in the world. And I can bear witness to the fact that it is not quite so chaotic as it seems at first glance, and that on the contrary, it is profoundly disciplined, though in its own unique way. For every Abyssinian, war is normal business, and military skills and rules of army life in the field enter in the flesh and blood of each of them, just as do the main principles of tactics. On the march, each soldier knows how to arrange necessary comforts for himself and to conserve his strength; but on the other hand, when necessary, he shows such endurance and is capable of action in conditions which are difficult even to imagine.

You see remarkable expediency in all the actions and skills of this army, and each soldier has an amazingly intelligent attitude toward managing the mission of the battle.

Despite such qualities, because of its impetuousness, it is much more difficult to control this army than a well-drilled European army, and I can only marvel at and admire the skill of its leaders and chiefs, of which there is no shortage."

In obedience to the agreement with Russia and the order of Menelik II, First Ethiopian officers began to be trained at the First Russian cadet school in 1901. 30 to 40 Ethiopian officers were trained in Russia from 1901 until 1913.

==== Under Haile Selassie I ====
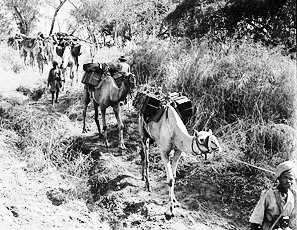
Ethiopian troops transporting supplies by camel through vegetation during the East African Campaign.

Under the regency of Emperor Haile Selassie (Tafari Mekonnen), the army was modernized. He created an Imperial Bodyguard, the Kebur Zabagna, in 1917 from the earlier Mahal Safari who had traditionally attended the Ethiopian Emperor. Its elite was trained at the French Saint-Cyr military academy or by Belgian military advisers. He also created his own military school at Holeta in January 1935.

Ethiopian military aviation efforts were initiated in 1929 when Haile Selassie hired two French pilots and purchased four French biplanes. By the time of the Italian invasion of 1935, the air force had four pilots and thirteen aircraft.

However, these efforts were not sufficient nor instituted in enough time to stop the rising tide of Italian fascism. Ethiopia was invaded and occupied by Italy during the Italian invasion of Ethiopia of 1935–36, marked for Ethiopia's first time being occupied by a foreign power. Ethiopia's patriots managed to resist and defeat the fascist Italian force after the 1941 East African Campaign of World War II with the help of British, South African and Nigerian forces. This made Ethiopia the only country in Africa that has never been colonized. After the Italians had been driven from the country, a British Military Mission to Ethiopia (BMME), under Major General Stephen Butler, was established to reorganize the Ethiopian Army. The Anglo-Ethiopian Agreement of 1944 removed the BMME from the jurisdiction of East Africa Command at Nairobi and made it responsible to the Ethiopian Minister of War.

Ethiopia bought twenty AH-IV tankettes from Czechoslovakia in the late 1940s. They were based on the Romanian R-1 variant and arrived in Djibouti on 9 May 1950 after which they were carried by rail to Addis Ababa. They were used until the 1980s when they participated in the fighting against Somalia.

==== Korean War ====
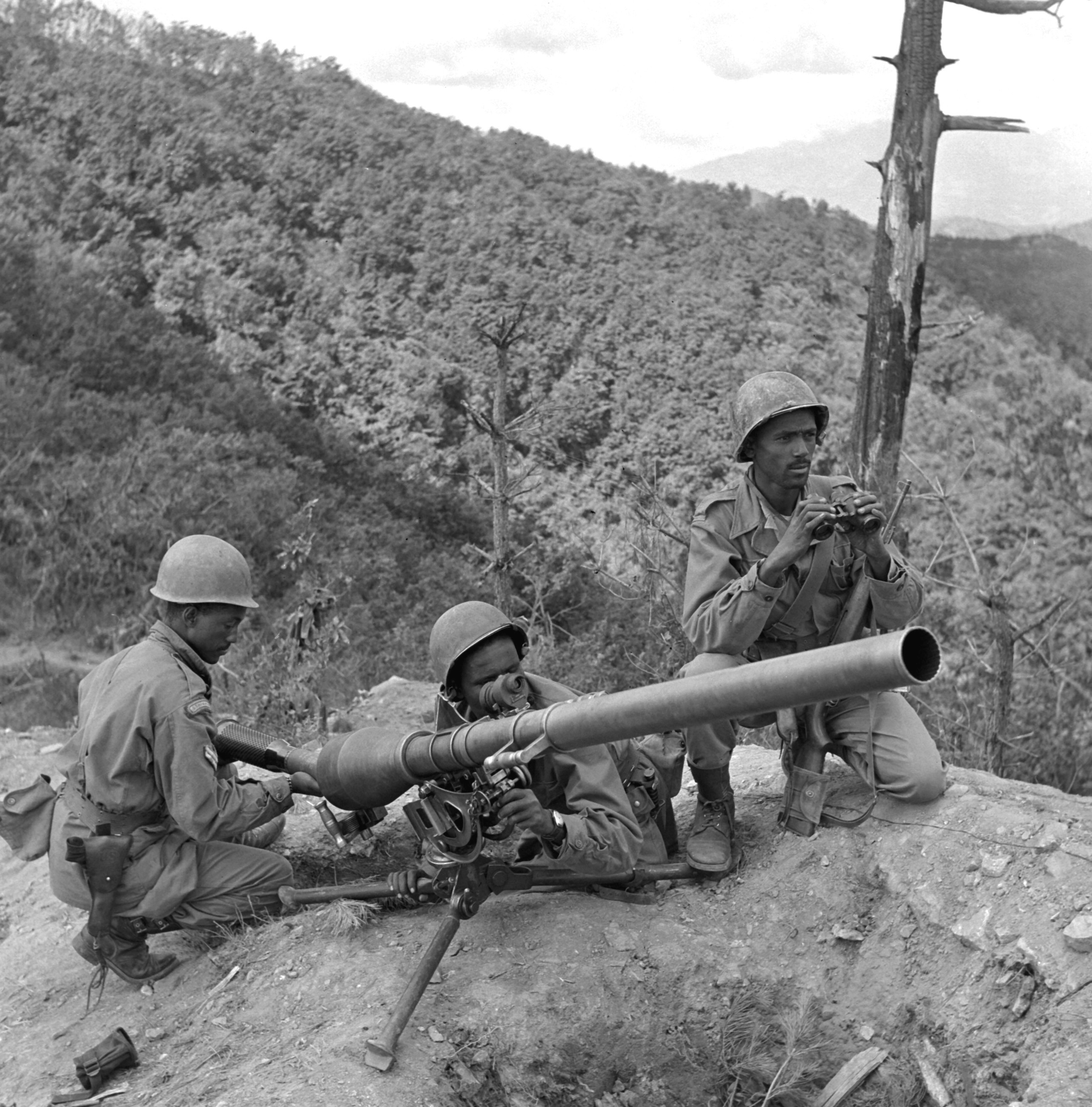
Ethiopian soldiers in the Korean War, 1951

In keeping with the principle of collective security, for which Haile Selassie was an outspoken proponent, Ethiopia sent a contingent under General Mulugeta Buli, known as the Kagnew Battalion, to take part in the Korean War. It was attached to the American 7th Infantry Division, and fought in several engagements including the Battle of Pork Chop Hill. 3,518 Ethiopian troops served in the war, of which 121 were killed and 536 wounded.

On May 22, 1953, a U.S.-Ethiopian Mutual Defense Assistance Agreement was signed. A U.S. Military Assistance Advisory Group was dispatched to Ethiopia and began its work by reorganizing the army into three divisions. On 25 September 1953, Selassie created the Imperial Ministry of National Defense that unified the Army, Air Force, and Navy. By 1956, the First Division had its headquarters at Addis Ababa (First, Second, Third Brigades, 5,300 strong); the Second Division was headquartered at Asmara, with the Fifth, Sixth, Seventh, Eighth, and Twelfth Brigades (4,500 strong); and Third Division Harar (with the Fourth, Ninth, Tenth, and Eleventh Brigades, 6,890 strong) respectively. The three divisions had a total of 16,832 troops. In May 1959, the Emperor established the Imperial Territorial Army as a reserve force that provided military training to civil servants.

In 1960 the U.S. Army Area Handbook for Ethiopia described the very personalized command arrangements then used by the Emperor:

The Emperor is by constitutional provision Commander-in-Chief, and to him are reserved all rights respecting the size of the forces and their organization and command, together with the power to appoint, promote, transfer and dismiss military officers. He seeks the advice and consent of Parliament in declaring war. Traditionally, he assumes personal command of the forces in time of war.

The Office of the Chief of Staff of the Imperial Ethiopian Armed Forces directed the Commanders of the Army, Air Force, and Navy, and the three army divisions were directly responsible to the Commander of the Army. The three divisions seemingly included the Third Division in the Ogaden, seen as a hardship post. While technically the Imperial Bodyguard (Kebur Zabagna) was responsible to the Army Commander, in reality, its commander received his orders directly from the Emperor.

Balambaras Abebe Aregai was one of the noted patriotic resistance leaders of Shoa (central Ethiopia) that rose to preeminence in the post-liberation period. He became Ras, a general and minister of defense of the Imperial Ethiopian Armed Forces until his death in the 1960 Ethiopian coup attempt.

Ethiopia contributed troops for the United Nations operation in the Congo – the United Nations Operation in the Congo - from July 1960. By 20 July 1960, 3,500 troops for ONUC had arrived in the Congo. The 3,500 consisted of 460 troops from Ethiopia (later to grow into the Tekil Brigade) as well as troops from Ghana, Morocco and Tunisia. Ethiopian Emperor Haile Selassie raised some 3,000 Imperial Bodyguard personnel- about 10 percent of the Ethiopian army's entire strength at that time-and made it part of the UN peacekeeping force in the Congo, along with an air force squadron. This volunteer battalion from the Imperial Bodyguard were authorized by the Emperor. The Tekil (or "Tekel") Brigade was stationed in Stanleyville.

Aman Mikael Andom commanded the Third Division during the 1964 Ethiopian–Somali Border War. He later became chief of staff of the Armed Forces in July 1974, and then Minister of Defense. He then became chairman of the Derg from September to December 1974.

Emperor Haile Selassie divided the Ethiopian military into separate commands. The US Army Handbook for Ethiopia notes that each service was provided with training and equipped from different foreign countries "to assure reliability and retention of power." The military consisted of the following: Imperial Bodyguard (also known as the "First Division", 8,000 men); three army divisions; services which included the Airborne, Engineers, and Signal Corps; the Territorial Army (5,000 men); and the police (28,000 men).

Among reported U.S. equipment deliveries to Ethiopia were 120 M59 and 39 M75 armored personnel carriers.

=== Seizure of power by the Derg 1974 and aftermath ===
The Coordinating Committee of the Armed Forces, Police, and Territorial Army, or the Derg (Amharic "Committee"), was officially announced 28 June 1974 by a group of military officers to maintain law and order due to the powerlessness of the civilian government following widespread mutiny in the armed forces of Ethiopia earlier that year. Its members were not directly involved in those mutinies, nor was this the first military committee organized to support the administration of Prime Minister Endelkachew Makonnen: Alem Zewde Tessema had established the Armed Forces Coordinated Committee on 23 March. However, over the following month's radicals in the Ethiopian military came to believe he was acting on behalf of the hated aristocracy, and when a group of notables petitioned for the release of several government ministers and officials who were under arrest for corruption and other crimes, three days later the Derg was announced.

The Derg, which originally consisted of soldiers at the capital, broadened its membership by including representatives from the 40 units of the Ethiopian Army, Air Force, Navy, Kebur Zabagna (Imperial Guard), Territorial Army and Police: each unit was expected to send three representatives, who were supposed to be privates, NCOs, and junior officers up to the rank of major. According to Bahru Zewde, "senior officers were deemed too compromised by close association to the regime."

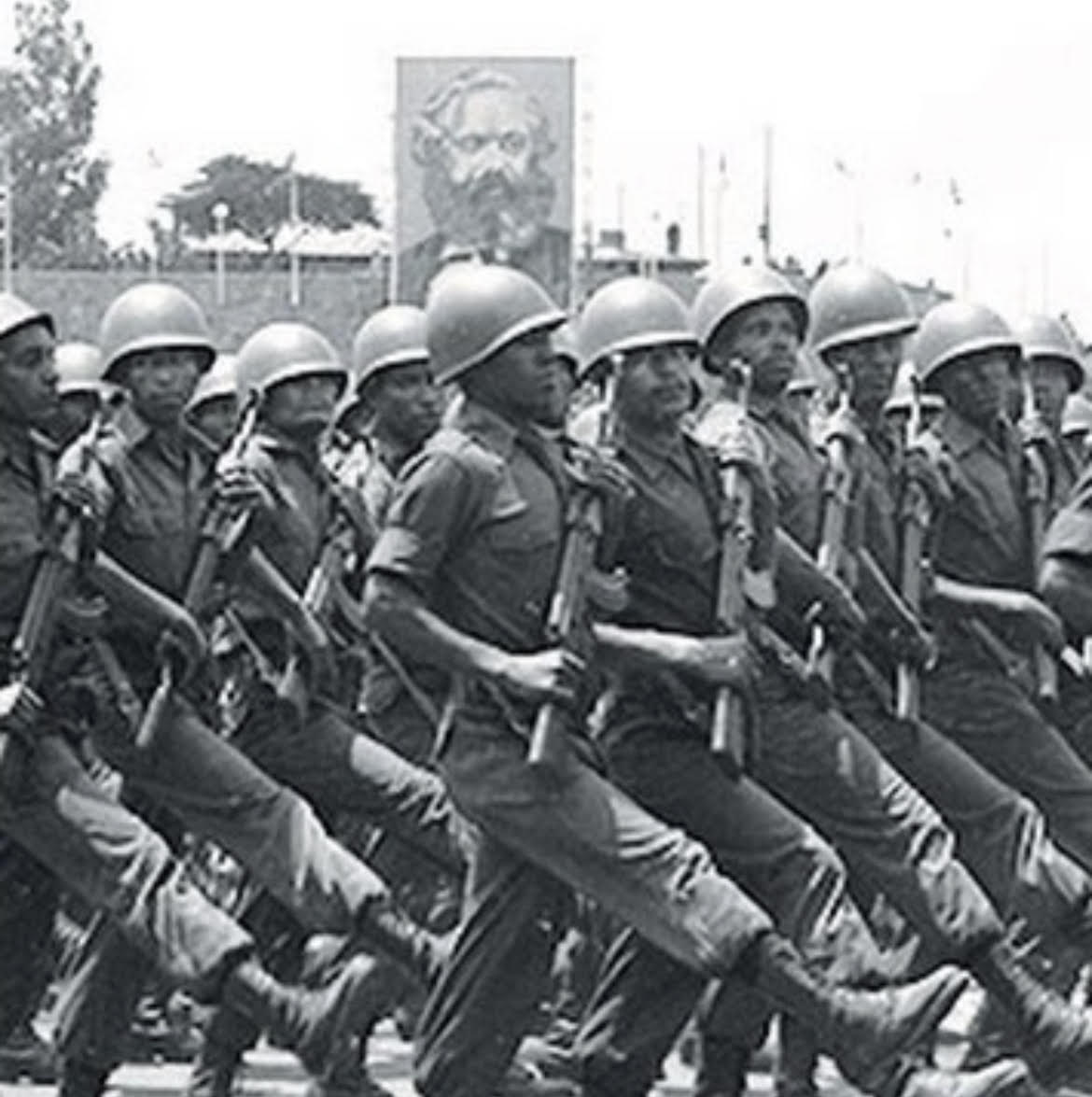
Ethiopian military parade marks anniversary of Derg takeover in Ethiopia, 1978

The committee elected Major Mengistu Haile Mariam as its chairman and Major Atnafu Abate as its vice-chairman. The Derg was initially supposed to study various military units' grievances, investigate abuses by senior officers and staff, and root out corruption in the military. In the months following its founding, the power of the Derg steadily increased. In July 1974 the Derg obtained key concessions from the Emperor, Haile Selassie, which included the power to arrest not only military officers but government officials at every level. Soon both former Prime Ministers Tsehafi Taezaz Aklilu Habte-Wold, and Endelkachew Makonnen, along with most of their cabinets, most regional governors, many senior military officers, and officials of the Imperial court found themselves imprisoned.

When the Derg gained control of Ethiopia, they lessened their reliance on the West. Instead, they began to draw their equipment and their sources for organizational and training methods from the Soviet Union and other Comecon countries, especially Cuba. During this period, Ethiopian forces were often locked in counter-insurgency campaigns against various guerrilla groups. They honed both conventional and guerrilla tactics during campaigns in Eritrea, and by repelling an invasion launched by Somalia in the 1977–1978 Ogaden War.

The Ethiopian army grew considerably under the Derg (1974–1987), and the People's Democratic Republic of Ethiopia under Mengistu (1987–1991), especially during the latter regime. The Library of Congress estimated forces underarms in 1974 at 41,000. By July 1975 the International Institute for Strategic Studies was listing a mechanised division in addition to three infantry divisions. Ayele writes that in November 1975, the "Nabalbal" ("Flame") force was created, subdivided into battalion-sized units of 400. Each battalion-sized unit was known as a hayl (force), and 20 were created within sixteen months. The "Nabalbal" units entered combat in 1977. When Ethiopian intelligence sources discovered Somali planning to seize the Ogaden, militia brigades were also created; first 30, then a total of 61 brigades totaling 143,350 by 1977–78. It appears that there were five regular line divisions active by the time of the 1977 Ogaden War, and the Library of Congress estimated the force size at the time as 53,500. With significant Soviet assistance, after that point the army's size grew rapidly; in 1979 it was estimated at 65,000. The 18th and 19th Mountain Infantry Divisions were then established in 1979-80 originally to seize Nakfa, in the Sahel Mountains, one of the remaining strongholds of the Eritrean insurgents. By the beginning of 1981 recruitment for the 21st and 22nd Mountain Infantry Divisions was underway; soon afterward, preparations for the large Operation Red Star were stepping up.

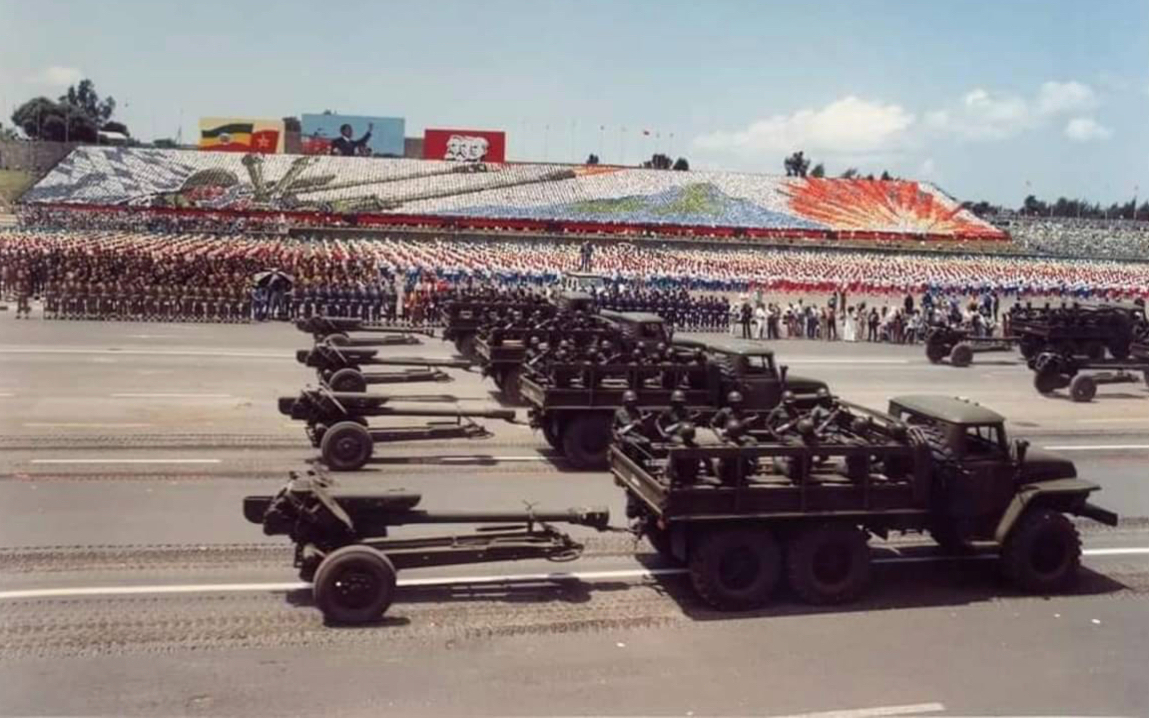
Military parade, 1980s

In April 1988 the Derg reorganized the army. The restoration of relations with Somalia meant that forces could be transferred from the First Revolutionary Army in the Ogaden, to the Second and Third Revolutionary Armies, the Third (TRA) being responsible for the provinces of Assab, Tigray, Wello, Gondar, and Gojjam. The very small Fourth Revolutionary Army became responsible for protecting the border with Kenya and those with Somalia and Sudan. In the place of the previous commands, thirteen corps were established instead, distributed amongst the army headquarters. Intensive efforts were made to enlist additional personnel. Total manpower after the reorganization reached a reported 388,000.

In May 1988 the Derg decided that before it could concentrate on destroying the EPLF, it would have to first eliminate the TPLF. Thus Operation Adwa was devised to seize the main TPLF base at Adi Ramets in Gondar Province. The Third Revolutionary Army's 603rd and 604th Corps were to play the main role, while the 605th Corps secured the rear, in Wello. The TRA's command structure was disrupted when Major General Mulatu Negash, the army commander, was supplanted by the arrival of Mengistu's favorite, Captain Lagesse Asfaw.

Cuba provided a significant influx of military advisors and troops over this period, with the largest escalation during the Ogaden War with Somalia, supported by a Soviet airlift:

- 1977–1978: 17,000 (Ogaden War)
- 1978: 12,000
- 1984: 3,000
- 1989: All forces withdrawn

==== 1990-91 Order of Battle ====
Gebru Tareke listed Ethiopian ground forces in 1990 as comprising four revolutionary armies organized as task forces, eleven corps, twenty-four infantry divisions, and four mountain divisions, reinforced by five mechanized divisions, two airborne divisions, and ninety-five brigades, including four mechanized brigades, three artillery brigades, four tank brigades, twelve special commandos and para commandos brigades – including the Spartakiad, which became operational in 1987 under the preparation and guidance of North Koreans – seven BM-rocket battalions, and ten brigades of paramilitary forces.

Forces underarms were estimated at 230,000 in early 1991. Mengistu's People's Militia had also grown to about 200,000 members. The mechanized forces of the army comprised 1,200 T-54/55, 100 T-62 tanks, and 1,100 armored personnel carriers (APCs), but readiness was estimated to be only about 30 percent operational, because of the withdrawal of financial support, lack of maintenance expertise and parts from the Soviet Union, Cuba, and other nations.

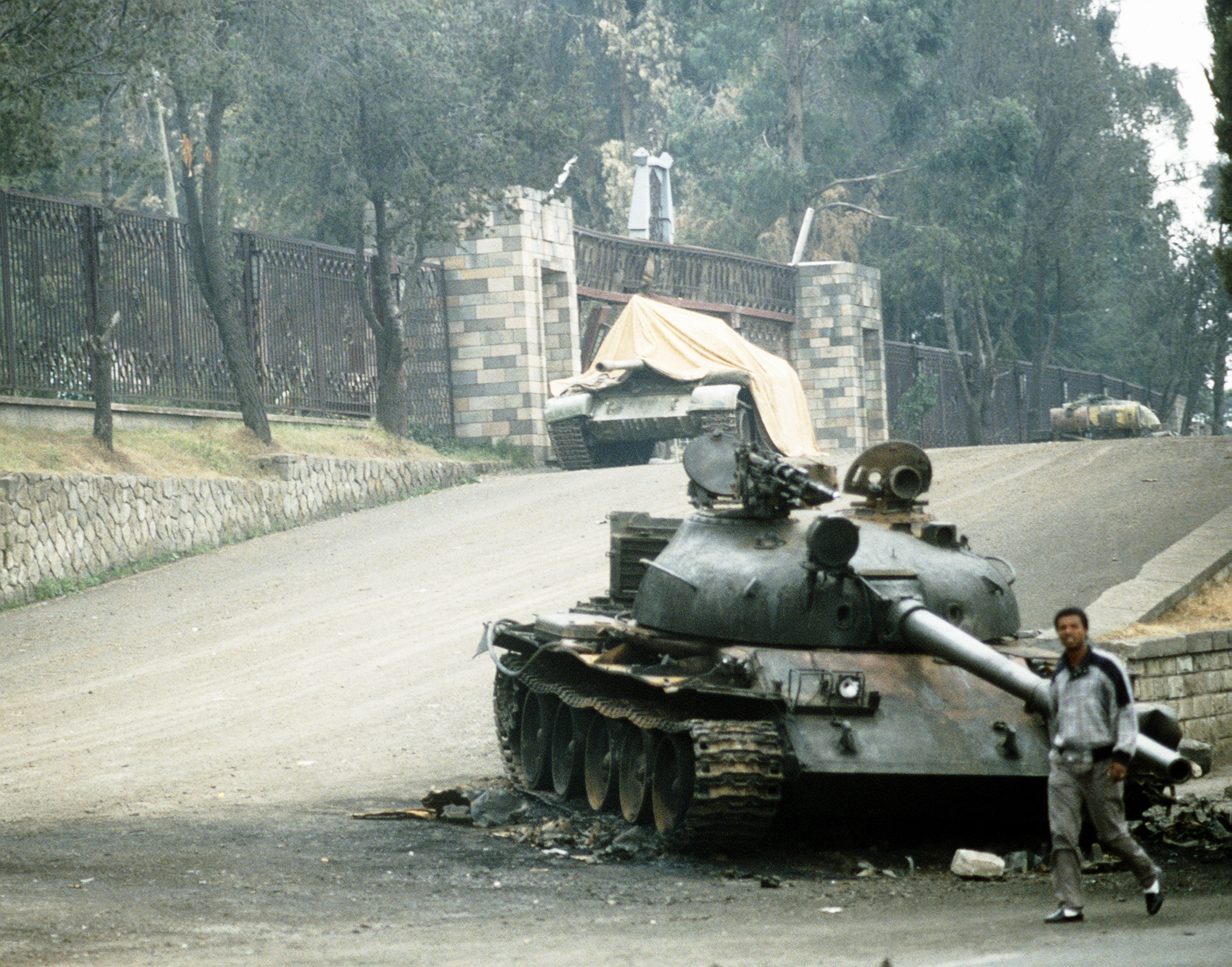
Ethiopian T-62 tanks at the end of the Ethiopian Civil War.

The army commands consisted of the:

- First Revolutionary Army (headquartered at Harar, 1988: 601st and 602nd Corps)
- Second Revolutionary Army (headquartered at Asmera, 1988: 606th-610th Corps)
- Third Revolutionary Army (headquartered at Kombolcha, 1988: 603rd, 604th, 605th Corps)
- Fourth Revolutionary Army (headquartered at Nekemte, 1988: 611th, 612th, 614th Corps)
- Fifth Revolutionary Army (headquartered at Gondar)

To these armies were assigned the operational forces of the army, comprising:

- 31 infantry divisions. The 30th and 31st Infantry Divisions were the last formed, circa November–December 1989. There were also the 102nd Airborne Division and 103rd Commando Divisions, which began training in January 1987.
- 32 tank battalions
- 40 artillery battalions
- 12 air defense battalions
- 8 commando brigades

Ethiopian soldiers have also committed many atrocities in the region of Tigray. They have used food and rape as weapons of war.

=== From 1991 ===
In 1991 Mengistu's government was overcome by the Ethiopian People's Revolutionary Democratic Front (EPRDF), People's Front for Democracy and Justice (PFDJ, former EPLF), Oromo Liberation Front (OLF) and other opposition factions. After the defeat of the military government, the provisional government disbanded the former national army and relied on its own guerrilla fighters. In 1993, however, the Tigrayan-led government announced plans to create a multi-ethnic defense force. This process entailed the creation of a new professional army and officer class and the demobilization of many of the irregulars who had fought against the military government. With the collapse of the Soviet Union, Ethiopia again turned to the Western powers for alliance and assistance. However, many Tigrayan officers remained in command positions. This transformation was still underway when war with Eritrea broke out in 1998, a development that saw the ranks of the armed forces swell along with defense expenditures.

Although the armed forces have significant battlefield experience, their militia orientation has complicated the transition to a structured, integrated military. Ranks and conventional units were only adopted in 1996. A United States-assisted effort to restructure the armed forces was interrupted by mobilization for the war with Eritrea.

==== The Ethiopia-Eritrea war ====
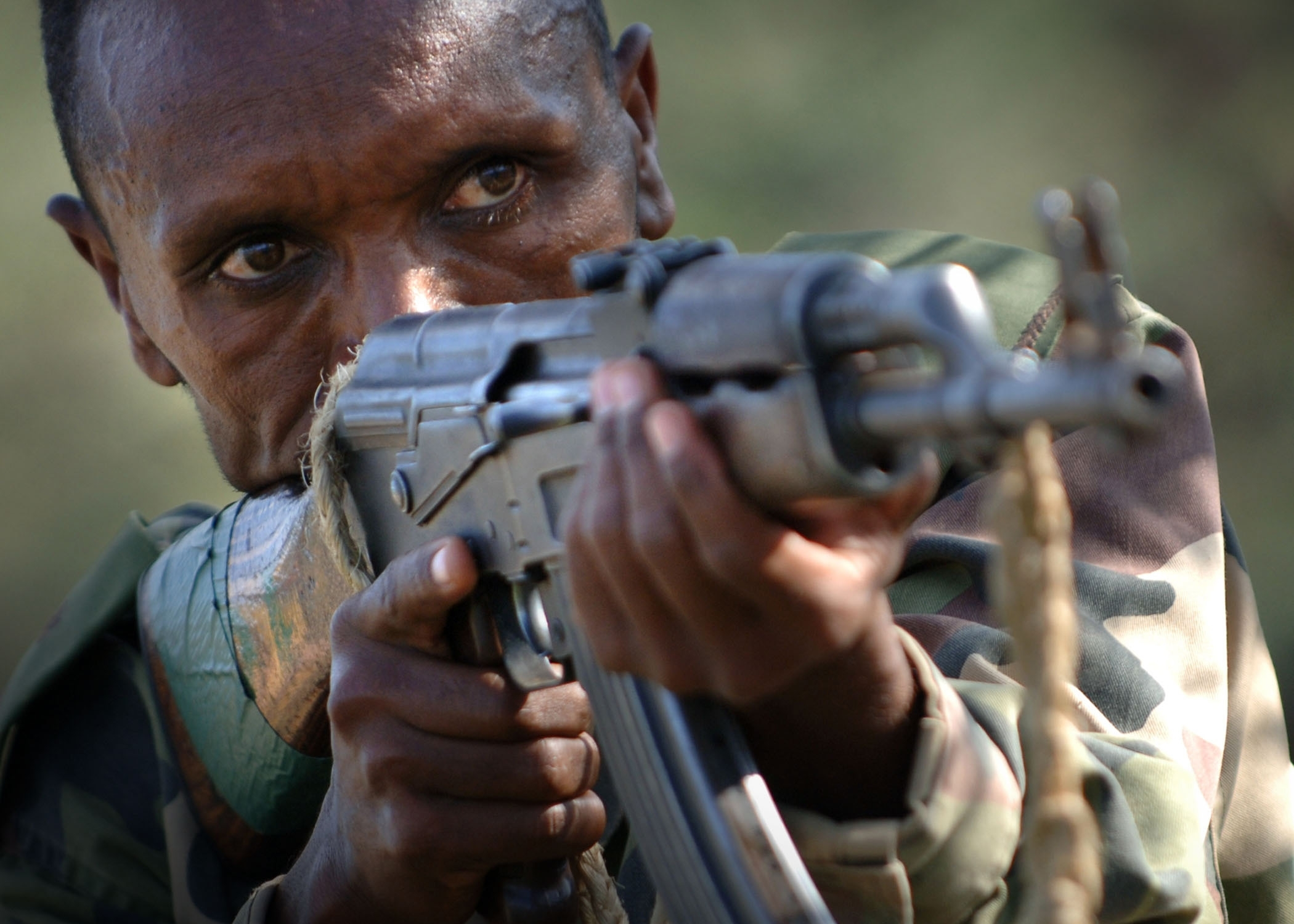
Soldier of Ethiopian National Defense Force, 2006.

The former allies EPRDF and PFDJ (former EPLF) led their countries Ethiopia and Eritrea, respectively, into the Eritrean-Ethiopian War of 1998. The war was fought over the disputed region of Badme. During the course of the war, some commanders and pilots from the former army and air force were recalled to duty. These officers helped turn the tide decisively against Eritrea in 2000. Following the war's end, the Eritrea-Ethiopia Boundary Commission, a body founded by the UN, established that the Badme region had in fact belonged to Eritrea. Although the two countries are now at peace, Ethiopia rejected the results of the international court's decision, and continued to occupy Badme. Most observers agree that Ethiopia's rejection of international law, coupled with the high numbers of soldiers maintained on the border by each side – a debilitatingly high number, particularly for the Eritrean side – means that the two countries are effectively still in conflict.

After the September 11 attacks in 2001, the Ethiopian army began to train with the U.S. Combined Joint Task Force - Horn of Africa (CJTF-HOA) established in Djibouti. Ethiopia allowed the US to station military advisors at Camp Hurso. Part of the training at Camp Hurso has included U.S. Army elements, including 4th Battalion, 31st Infantry, training the 12th, 13th and 14th Division Reconnaissance Companies, which from July 2003 were being formed into a new Ethiopian anti-terrorism battalion.

==== Somalia ====
Approximately 50,000 to 60,000 ENDF troops backed by tanks, helicopter gunships and jets were involved in the military offensive against the Islamic Courts Union during December 2006. Colonel Gabre Heard, a senior ENDF officer and Tigray People's Liberation Front (TPLF) official, was commander-in-chief of Ethiopian troops during the invasion. During 2007 military experts estimated 50,000 Ethiopian troops were occupying parts of Somalia. During the war, US Special Forces, CIA paramilitary units, and Marine units, supported by American AC-130s and helicopter gunships, directly intervened in support of the ENDF. In early 2007, after the military occupation of Mogadishu and Somali insurgency began, Ethiopian troops launched major offensives in Mogadishu. Large scale bombardments were carried out on Mogadishu neighborhoods deemed to be insurgent strongholds. ENDF forces were primarily responsible for the large scale bombardment and significant civilian losses that occurred in the city. Human Rights Watch reported that the Ethiopian army extensively utilized BM-21 Grad rocket shelling to bombard densely populated Mogadishu neighborhoods. The ENDF characterized the violence in this period as being part of a 'final push' against the rebels, but the fierce fighting in Mogadishu during the first half of 2007 failed to quell the growing insurgency.

Urban warfare in Mogadishu proved to be especially difficult for the ENDF and caused heavy losses, which had reached unsustainable levels by the end of 2007. Thousands of Ethiopian troops had been killed during fierce fighting for Mogadishu during 2007. Oxford Analytica observed that the Ethiopian military aimed to win a war of attrition against the Somali insurgency. ENDF troops were bogged down and facing a multi front war with no prospect of victory. By Autumn of 2008, the insurgency controlled more than 80% of the territory that had been previously lost in the invasion. As the situation rapidly deteriorated for the military occupation in mid-2008, Ethiopian troops started experiencing desertions. The ENDF began to draw down its forces deployed in Mogadishu and across towns in Somalia. The occupation had a 'corrosive effect' on the ENDF and the Somalia deployment was viewed as a hardship post. By November 2008, insurgency had effectively won. The majority of south and central Somalia, along with the capital was now under the control of Islamist factions. Ethiopia had redeployed much of its army out of Somalia by the end of the year. On 16 January 2009, Ethiopian troops withdrew from Mogadishu.

Under the command of Colonel Gabre Heard, nicknamed 'Butcher of Mogadishu', the ENDF routinely bombed civilian areas and killed thousands of civilians. Reports of atrocities by forces under his command have made him infamous in Somalia. American reporters touring rural Somalia reported that in village after village, locals had described a reign of terror by the Ethiopian army. In late 2011, Ethiopian troops returned to Somalia (coinciding with Kenya's invasion) in large numbers for the first time since their 2009 withdrawal. In 2014 the Ethiopian troops that deployed to a buffer zone in some parts of southern Somalia were integrated into AMISOM.

Information regarding casualties in Somalia is unknown as the ENDF designates all operations in the country "Top Secret."

==== The Northern War ====
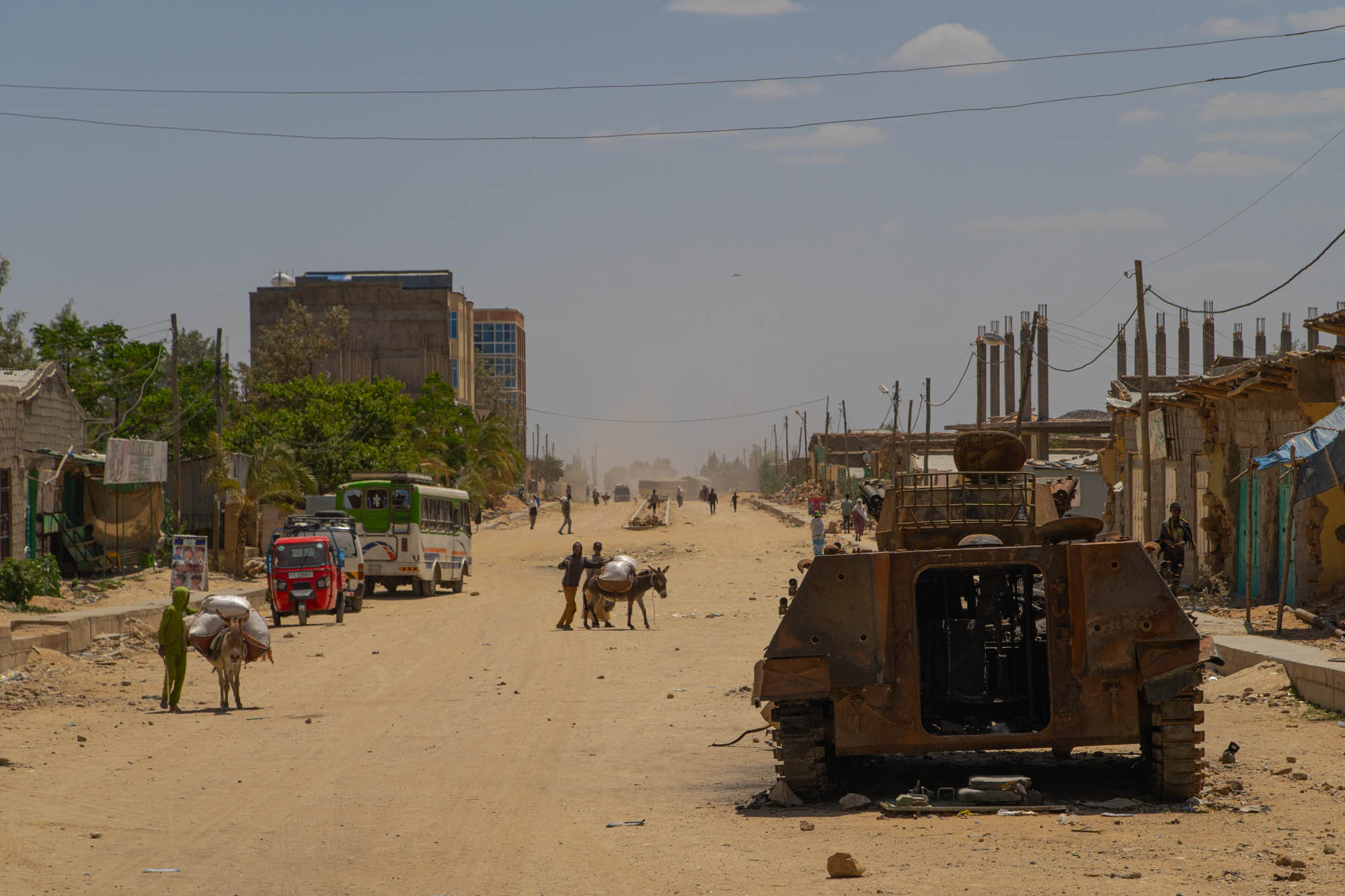
A destroyed ENDF armored vehicle lays in one of the main streets of Hawzen on 6 June 2021

On 8 November 2020, ENDF troops backed by militias from the Amhara and the Eritrean Defence Forces regions were deployed to the Tigray Region in response to a coordinated 'preemptive strike' by TPLF against the Northern Command of ENDF. Since the beginning of the conflict, ENDF personnel has been accused of involvement in alleged war crimes against civilians in the Tigray Region. These unproven accusations include rape and other gender based violence, as well as extrajudicial killings in Hagere Selam, Hitsats, Humera, Debre Abbay, and other areas where the conflict is ongoing. The Prime Minister of Ethiopia, Abiy Ahmed, has publicly acknowledged the possibility of war crimes taking place within the Tigray Region. Abiy did not however link these actions to the Ethiopian military, and instead cited such reports were likely "propaganda of exaggeration" by the Tigray People's Liberation Front, currently opposing federal forces in the northern region.

The Italian weekly magazine Panorama published a graphic video in which Amharic-speaking ENDF soldiers killed a group of 9 people in Humera in August 2021 and then put their bodies on fire. The video also shows torturing of one man by soldiers, then tying him up, preparing to throw him in the river.

The professional army of ENDF took significant casualties during the war, forcing the ENDF to rely on citizen soldiers until it was prepared for a counter-offensive, while it retreated from the northern part of Ethiopia. When the ENDF took high casualties and the need for more manpower arose, the government started recruiting soldiers en-masse, with the prime minister himself leading by example the recruitment effort as well as the war from the frontlines, this happened during the TDF–OLA joint offensive which threatened Addis Ababa. Human wave attacks accusations were made during the war on the ENDF, such tactics are usually very costly in human life. In addition, in the lead-up and early on in the war, tigrayan military officers of the ENDF—which had constituted 80% of the officer corps of the ENDF—had defected to the TPLF. This greatly reducing the amount of capable COs and NCOs. This all indicates that the ENDF is coming out of the war enlarged in size, but with significant leadership/officer shortages that raises questions for the future, as in, can the ENDF control the regional militias that has sprung up and that could pose future threats to Ethiopia. With already signs of tensions arising between the central government and militias, with militias such as Fano, where the government arrested 4,000 militia members due to its "illegal activities." The ENDF has significant challenges coming out of the Northern War, such as coping with potential loss of leadership due to casualties, logistics or equipment losses.

== Size and strength ==
The size of the ENDF has fluctuated significantly since the end of the Ethiopia-Eritrea war in 2000. In 2002 the Ethiopian Defense Forces had a strength of approximately 250,000-350,000 troops. This was roughly the same number maintained during the Derg regime that fell to the rebel forces in 1991. However, that number was later reduced, and in January 2007, during the War in Somalia, Ethiopian forces were said to comprise about 300,000 troops. In 2012, the IISS estimated that the ground forces had 135,000 personnel and the air force 3,000.

As of 2012, the ENDF consists of two separate branches: the Ground Forces and the Ethiopian Air Force. Ethiopia has several defense industrial organizations that produce and overhaul different weapons systems. Most of these were built under the Derg regime which planned a large military industrial complex. The ENDF relies on voluntary military service of people above 18 years of age. Although there is no compulsory military service, armed forces may conduct call-ups when necessary and compliance is compulsory.

Modern day Ethiopia, being a landlocked country, has no active navy. Ethiopia reacquired a coastline on the Red Sea in 1950 and created the Ethiopian Navy in 1955. Eritrean independence in 1991 left Ethiopia landlocked again, but the Ethiopian Navy continued to operate from foreign ports until it was finally disbanded in 1996.

In June 2018, Prime Minister Abiy Ahmed called for the eventual reconstitution of the Ethiopian Navy as part of a wider program of security sector reforms, saying that "we should build our naval force capacity in the future."

In March 2019, Abiy Ahmed signed defense accords with France's Emmanuel Macron, including on support in establishing a naval component.

The Ethiopian Navy is based in Djibouti, and its headquarters is in Bahir Dar, Ethiopia.

== Peacekeeping ==
Ethiopia has served in various United Nations and African Union peacekeeping missions. These have included Ivory Coast, on the Burundi border, and in Rwanda.

Two major previous Ethiopian missions were in Liberia and Darfur. The United Nations Mission in Liberia (UNMIL) was established by United Nations Security Council Resolution 1509, of 19 September 2003, to support the implementation of the ceasefire agreement and the peace process, protect United Nations staff, facilities and civilians, support humanitarian and human rights activities; as well as assist in national security reform, including national police training and formation of a new, restructured military. In November 2007, nearly 1,800 Ethiopian troops serving with the UNMIL were presented with UN Peacekeeping medals for their "invaluable contribution to the peace process." Up to three Ethiopian battalions used to constitute Sector 4 of the UN Mission, covering the southern part of the country. The mission ended in 2018.

Many thousands of Ethiopian peacekeepers were also involved in the hybrid United Nations–African Union Mission in Darfur (UNAMID) in western Sudan. The Security Council authorized a force of about 26,000 uniformed personnel. The Darfur mission was shut down in 2020–21.

Ethiopia also provides the entire force for the UN's Abyei mission, the United Nations Interim Security Force for Abyei. An Ethiopian officer commands the force.

== The National Defense Day ==
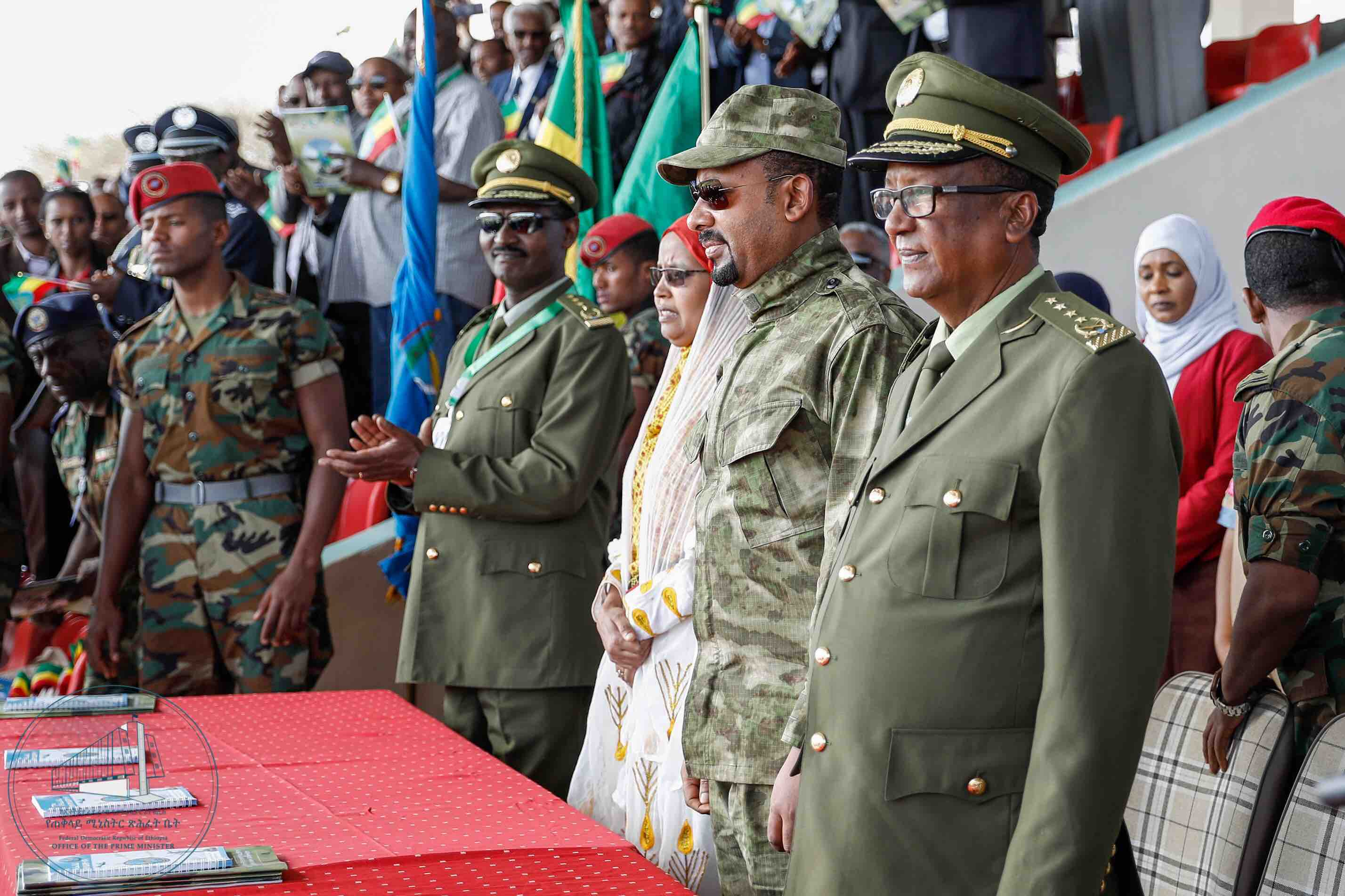
Defence Day 2019

The National Defense Day is celebrated annually as the holiday of the ENDF on October 26. The day celebrates the establishment Ethiopian National Defense force for the first time in Ethiopian history, on 26 October 1907. It is celebrated for four days.

== See also ==
- African military systems after 1900
- DAVEC
- Ethiopian Air Force
- Ethiopian Navy
- Tsimdo – Rebel military and politician coalition in Ethiopia
