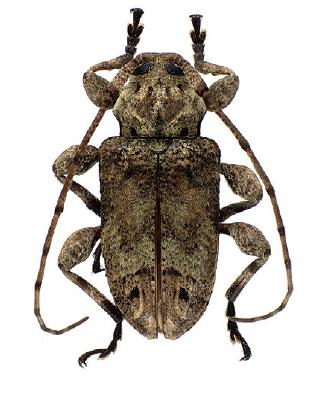

Scientific classification
- Kingdom: Animalia
- Phylum: Arthropoda
- Class: Insecta
- Order: Coleoptera
- Suborder: Polyphaga
- Infraorder: Cucujiformia
- Family: Cerambycidae
- Genus: Leptostylopsis
- Species: L. poeyi

Binomial name
- Leptostylopsis poeyi Fisher, 1925

= Leptostylopsis poeyi =

Species of beetle

Leptostylopsis poeyi is a species of longhorn beetles of the subfamily Lamiinae. It was reported by Fisher in 1925.
