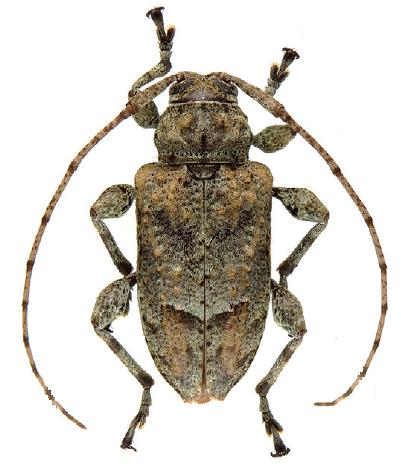

Scientific classification
- Kingdom: Animalia
- Phylum: Arthropoda
- Clade: Pancrustacea
- Class: Insecta
- Order: Coleoptera
- Suborder: Polyphaga
- Infraorder: Cucujiformia
- Family: Cerambycidae
- Genus: Leptostylopsis
- Species: L. annulipes

Binomial name
- Leptostylopsis annulipes (Fisher, 1942)

= Leptostylopsis annulipes =

Species of beetle

Leptostylopsis annulipes is a species of longhorn beetles of the subfamily Lamiinae.

== Description ==
The beetle is 7–10 millimetres (0.28–0.39 in) long and 3.5–4 millimetres (0.14–0.16 in) wide. The head is covered throughout in dense, appressed, mottled tawny, white, or pale green pubescence, with exception of a mostly obscured, narrow, median-frontal line extending from fronto-clypeal margin to between lower eye lobes and short, glabrous frontal-genal line extending from anterior tentorial pits along anterior margin of genae to base of mandible. The antennae are covered with dense, appressed, mottled white and tawny pubescence; annulate at apex and base of most antennomeres. Last antennomere uniformly dark, without annuli, of similar coloration to apex of penultimate antennomere. Antennae longer than body, extending beyond apices by 3-4 antennomeres. In both sexes, last antennomere subequal to penultimate. Antennal scape extending to posterior 1/3 or 1/4 of pronotum. The lower eye lobe is about as tall as gena below it; over 2 × height of upper eye lobe; lobes connected by 4-6 rows of ommatidia in most specimens. Upper eye lobes separated by little more than greatest width of scape.

The frontoclypeal margin with fringe of short pubescence extending about halfway to base of labrum; clypeus without pubescence except at extreme base. Labrum is coated with dense, mostly appressed, white or off -white pubescence with 8-10 long, suberect, translucent setae. Pronotum with very slightly protuberant, broadly rounded lateral tubercles with greatest projection slightly behind middle; with weakly raised dorsal tubercles with following arrangement: large oval prominence at middle, surrounded by four smaller prominences (two anterolateral, two posterolateral). Pronotum with slight anteromedial elevation at margin. Pronotum mostly covered in appressed pubescence of several colors (white, pale green, tawny, and ochre). Ochraceous pubescence forms two indistinct anterolateral maculae. Pronotum with slight constriction before anterior and posterior margins, with constrictions (particularly posteriorly) lined with row of separate, large punctures. Additional smaller punctures scattered over pronotal disk, someobscured by pubescence. Prosternum smooth, impunctate, covered with uniform, appressed, white or tawny pubescence. Prosternal process broad between procoxae, about 3/4 width of procoxa in most specimens. Scutellum moderately to densely tawny or ochraceous pubescent (occasionally with white pubescence at base and pale iridescent green pubescence at apex); broadly rounded posteriorly. Mesosternum smooth, impunctate, covered with uniform, appressed pubescence, less dense on anterior 1/3 which is deeply constricted. Mesosternal process between mesocoxae very broad, widely separating mesocoxae by about 1.25 × width of mesocoxa. Metasternum covered with appressed, white, off white, to slightly pale green pubescence, becoming mottled at sides and on lateral thoracic sclerites.

The elytra are covered with combination of mostly appressed, white, tawny, ochraceous, or iridescent green pubescence; with pattern of variably developed white pubescence broadly across middle 1/3, bordered posteriorly by short, transverse black macula emanating from suture; additional dark, vaguely defined macula posterior to basal elytral elevations. Rows of small tubercles present, generally following along costae and very weakly along suture. Tubercles at base of elytra most prominent, forming weak crests. Humeri projecting slightly, marked at anterior margin (base) with black macula that corresponds to small black macula on prothorax. Epipleuron with vague iridescent pale green pubescence in most specimens. Elytral apex subtruncate, with outer apical angle more produced posteriorly than sutural angle. The legs are mostly uniformly pubescent with appressed hairs (white, tawny, iridescent green, in some combination), somewhat mottled; apex and basal 1/3 of tibiae annulate due to less dense pubescence exposing darker integument. Tibiae approximately equal in length to femora; hind legs much longer than forelegs; metafemora extending to about abdominal apex. Tarsi generally covered with short, appressed, pale pubescence; apex of fifth tarsomere sparsely pubescent, dark. The abdominal ventrites are covered with appressed, white, tawny, or iridescent green pubescence (or some combination), becoming splotchy at sides. Fifth ventrite about 2.3 × broader than long in females; narrowed and extended at middle, with glabrous midline at base, extending toward apex for 1/3 or more of overall length.

== Distribution ==
The species is endemic to Hispaniola, from southeastern Haiti and throughout the Dominican Republic.
