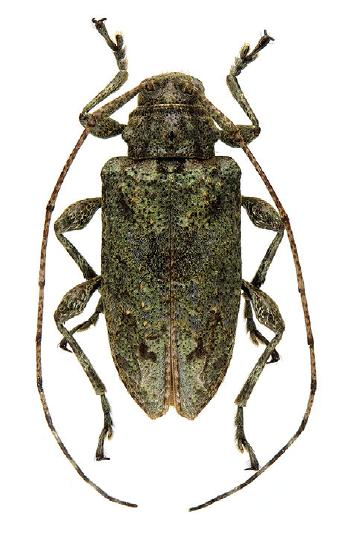

Scientific classification
- Kingdom: Animalia
- Phylum: Arthropoda
- Class: Insecta
- Order: Coleoptera
- Suborder: Polyphaga
- Infraorder: Cucujiformia
- Family: Cerambycidae
- Genus: Leptostylopsis
- Species: L. chlorescens

Binomial name
- Leptostylopsis chlorescens Lingafelter & Micheli, 2009

= Leptostylopsis chlorescens =

Species of beetle

Leptostylopsis chlorescens is a species of longhorn beetles of the subfamily Lamiinae. It was described by Lingafelter and Micheli in 2009.
