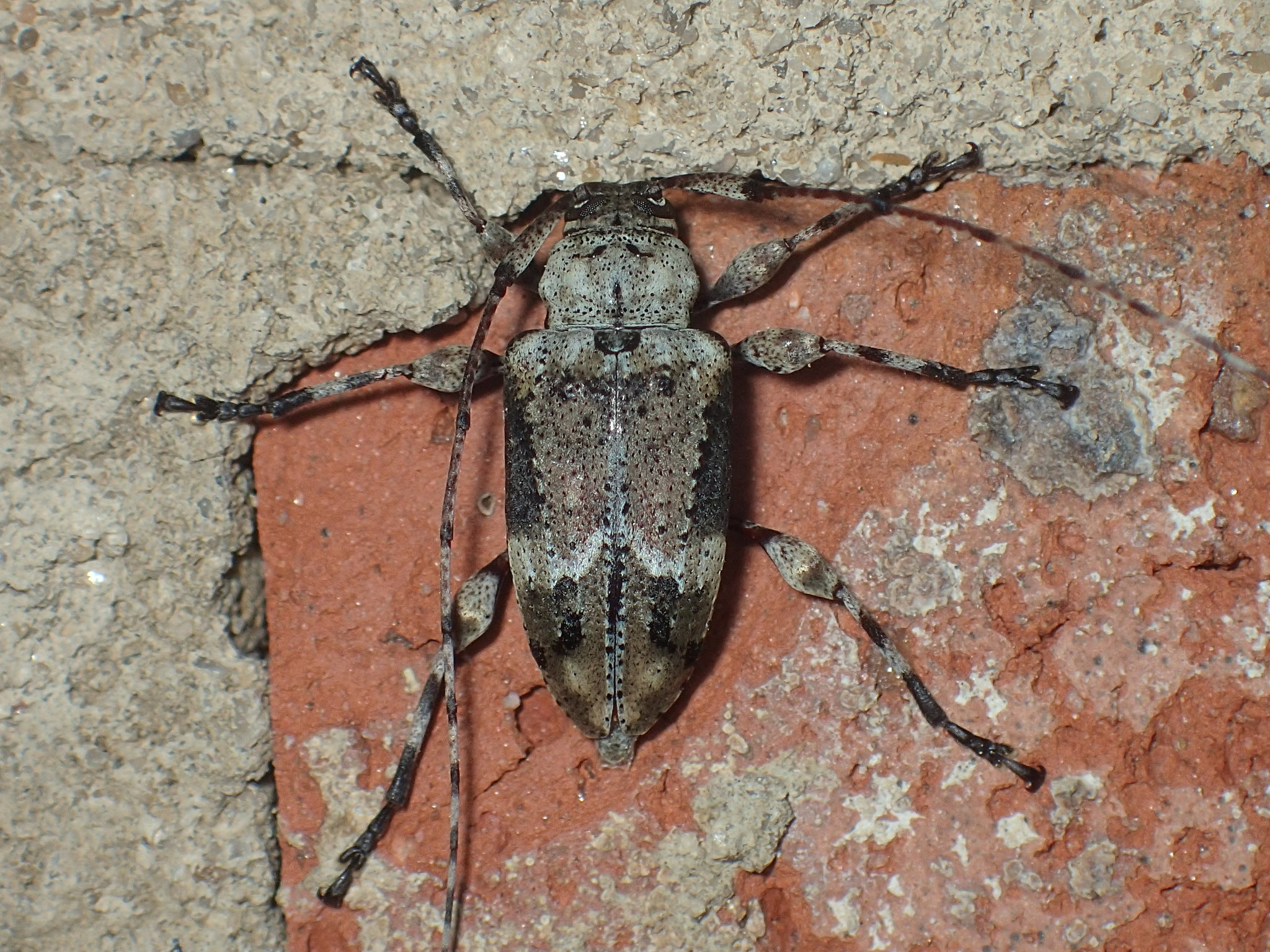

Scientific classification
- Kingdom: Animalia
- Phylum: Arthropoda
- Class: Insecta
- Order: Coleoptera
- Suborder: Polyphaga
- Infraorder: Cucujiformia
- Family: Cerambycidae
- Genus: Leptostylopsis
- Species: L. planidorsus

Binomial name
- Leptostylopsis planidorsus (LeConte, 1873)

Synonyms
- Leptostylopsis crescenticus (Casey, 1913); Leptostylopsis lecontei (Casey, 1913)

= Leptostylopsis planidorsus =

Species of beetle

Leptostylopsis planidorsus is a species of flat-faced longhorn in the beetle family Cerambycidae. It is found in North America.
