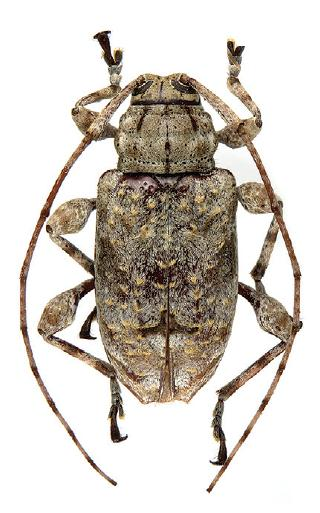

Scientific classification
- Domain: Eukaryota
- Kingdom: Animalia
- Phylum: Arthropoda
- Class: Insecta
- Order: Coleoptera
- Suborder: Polyphaga
- Infraorder: Cucujiformia
- Family: Cerambycidae
- Genus: Leptostylopsis
- Species: L. argentatus

Binomial name
- Leptostylopsis argentatus Jacquelin du Val, 1857

= Leptostylopsis argentatus =

Species of beetle

Leptostylopsis argentatus is a species of longhorn beetles of the subfamily Lamiinae. It was described by Jacquelin du Val in 1857.
