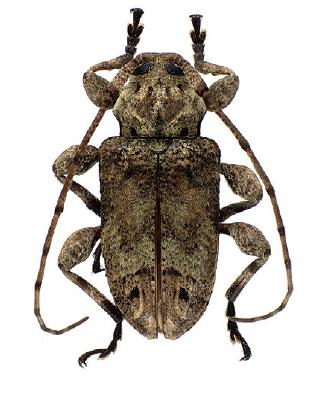

Scientific classification
- Domain: Eukaryota
- Kingdom: Animalia
- Phylum: Arthropoda
- Class: Insecta
- Order: Coleoptera
- Suborder: Polyphaga
- Infraorder: Cucujiformia
- Family: Cerambycidae
- Tribe: Acanthocinini
- Genus: Leptostylopsis; Dillon, 1956

= Leptostylopsis =

Genus of beetles

Leptostylopsis is a genus of longhorn beetles of the subfamily Lamiinae.

== Selected species ==
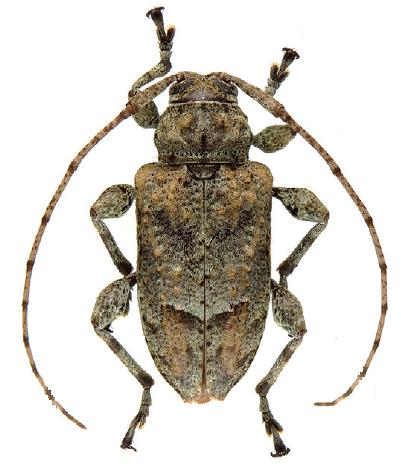
Leptostylopsis annulipes Fisher, 1942, formerly Leptostylus annulipes

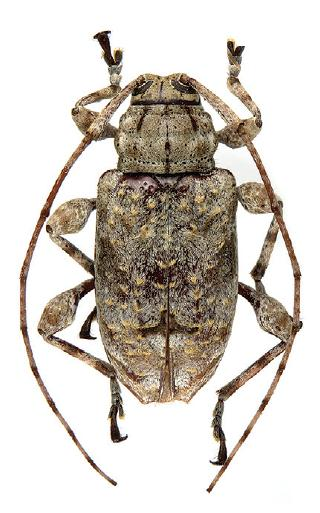
Leptostylopsis argentatus Jacquelin du Val, 1857

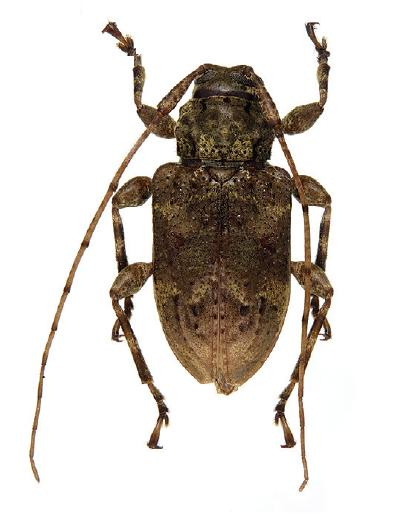
Leptostylopsis basifulvus Lingafelter and Micheli, 2009

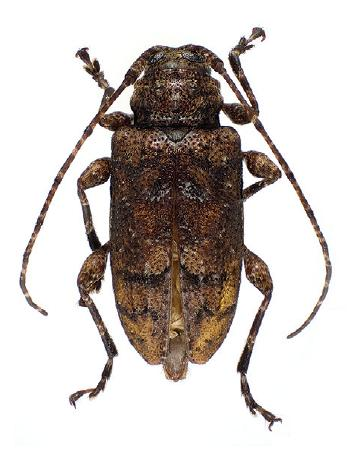
Leptostylopsis caliginosus Lingafelter and Micheli, 2009

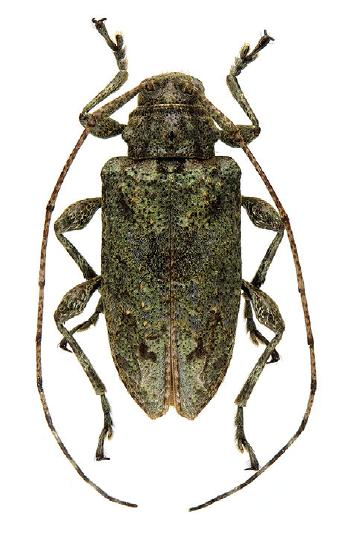
Leptostylopsis chlorescens Lingafelter and Micheli, 2009

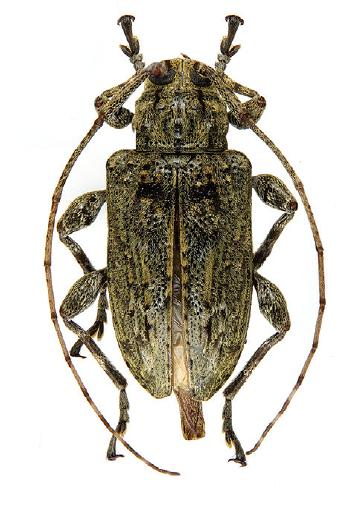
Leptostylopsis cristatus Fisher, 1925

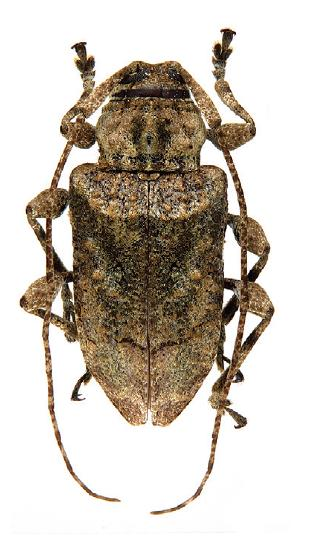
Leptostylopsis humerofulvus Lingafelter and Micheli, 2009

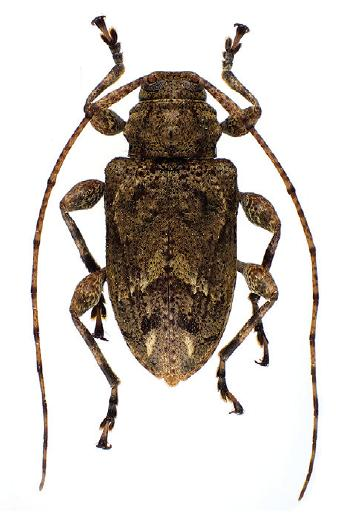
Leptostylopsis milleri Fisher, 1932

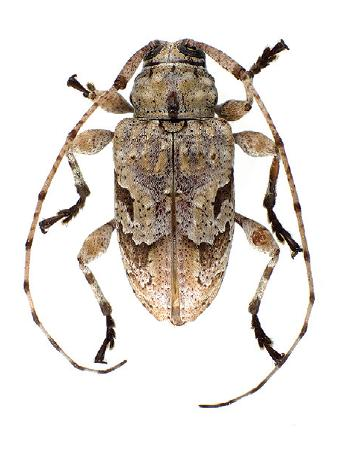
Leptostylopsis perfasciatus Lingafelter and Micheli, 2009

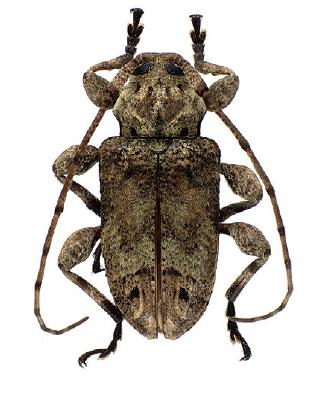
Leptostylopsis poeyi Fisher, 1925, formerly Leptostylus poeyi

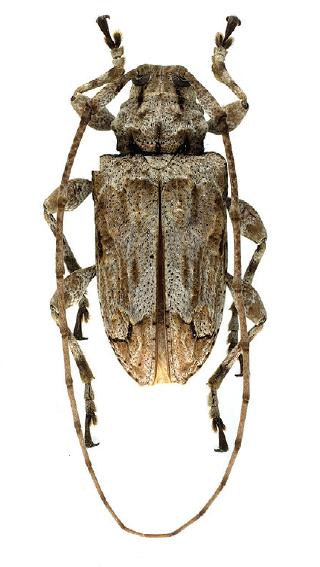
Leptostylopsis puntacanaensis Lingafelter and Micheli, 2009

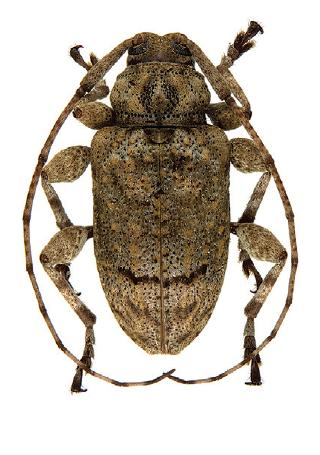
Leptostylopsis terraecolor (Horn, 1880)

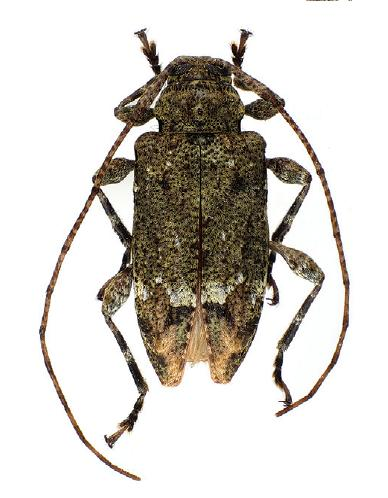
Leptostylopsis thomasi Lingafelter and Micheli, 2009

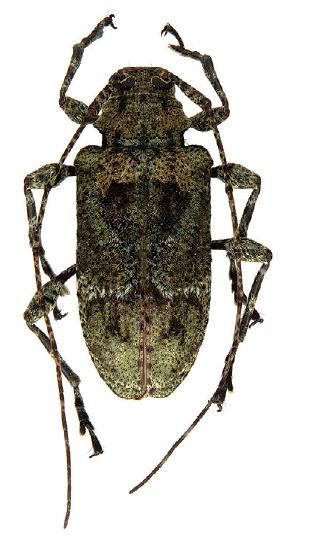
Leptostylopsis viridicomus Fisher, 1942, formerly Leptostylus viridicomus

== Species List ==
These 36 species belong to the genus Leptostylopsis:

- Leptostylopsis albofasciatus (Fisher, 1926)^{i c g}
- Leptostylopsis albosignatus (Fisher, 1935)^{i}
- Leptostylopsis annulipes (Fisher, 1942)^{c g}
- Leptostylopsis antillarum (Fisher, 1925)^{i c g}
- Leptostylopsis argentatus (Jacquelin du Val in Sagra, 1857)^{i c g b}
- Leptostylopsis atromaculatus (Fisher, 1926)^{c g}
- Leptostylopsis basifulvus Lingafelter & Micheli, 2009^{c g}
- Leptostylopsis bidentatus (Fabricius, 1775)^{c g}
- Leptostylopsis caliginosus Lingafelter & Micheli, 2009^{c g}
- Leptostylopsis chlorescens Lingafelter & Micheli, 2009^{c g}
- Leptostylopsis cristatus (Fisher, 1925)^{c g}
- Leptostylopsis duvali (Fisher, 1926)^{c g}
- Leptostylopsis guanica Micheli & Micheli, 2004^{c g}
- Leptostylopsis gundlachi (Fisher, 1925)^{i c g}
- Leptostylopsis humerofulvus Lingafelter & Micheli, 2009^{c g}
- Leptostylopsis incrassatus (Klug, 1829)^{c g}
- Leptostylopsis jamaicensis (Gahan, 1895)^{c g}
- Leptostylopsis latus Chemsak & Feller, 1988^{c g}
- Leptostylopsis longicornis (Fisher, 1926)^{i c g}
- Leptostylopsis luteus Dillon, 1956^{i c g}
- Leptostylopsis martinicensis Villiers, 1980^{c g}
- Leptostylopsis milleri (Fisher, 1932)^{c g}
- Leptostylopsis monin Micheli & Micheli, 2004^{c g}
- Leptostylopsis monticola (Fisher, 1935)^{c g}
- Leptostylopsis oakleyi (Fisher, 1935)^{i}
- Leptostylopsis ornatus (Fisher, 1928)^{c g}
- Leptostylopsis perfasciatus Lingafelter & Micheli, 2009^{c g}
- Leptostylopsis planidorsus (LeConte, 1873)^{i c g b}
- Leptostylopsis poeyi (Fisher, 1925)^{c g}
- Leptostylopsis puntacanaensis Lingafelter & Micheli, 2009^{c g}
- Leptostylopsis smithi (Gahan, 1895)^{c g}
- Leptostylopsis terraecolor (Horn, 1880)^{i c g b}
- Leptostylopsis testaceus (Frölich, 1792)^{c g}
- Leptostylopsis thomasi Lingafelter & Micheli, 2009^{c g}
- Leptostylopsis viridicomus (Fisher, 1942)^{c g}
- Leptostylopsis yukiyu Micheli & Micheli, 2004^{c g}

Data sources: i = ITIS, c = Catalogue of Life, g = GBIF, b = Bugguide.net
