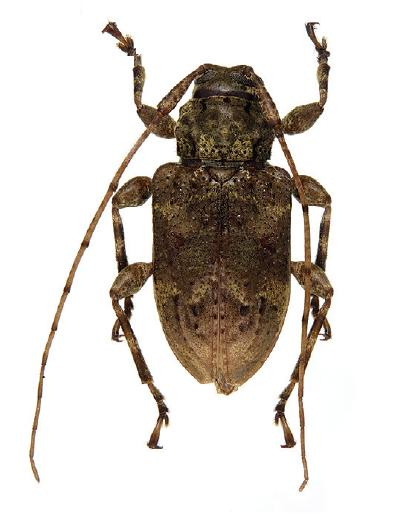

Scientific classification
- Domain: Eukaryota
- Kingdom: Animalia
- Phylum: Arthropoda
- Class: Insecta
- Order: Coleoptera
- Suborder: Polyphaga
- Infraorder: Cucujiformia
- Family: Cerambycidae
- Genus: Leptostylopsis
- Species: L. basifulvus

Binomial name
- Leptostylopsis basifulvus Lingafelter & Micheli, 2009

= Leptostylopsis basifulvus =

Species of beetle

Leptostylopsis basifulvus is a species of longhorn beetles of the subfamily Lamiinae. It was described by Lingafelter and Micheli in 2009 and is found in the Dominican Republic.
