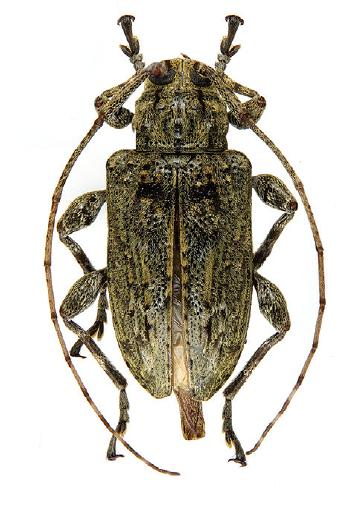

Scientific classification
- Kingdom: Animalia
- Phylum: Arthropoda
- Class: Insecta
- Order: Coleoptera
- Suborder: Polyphaga
- Infraorder: Cucujiformia
- Family: Cerambycidae
- Genus: Leptostylopsis
- Species: L. cristatus

Binomial name
- Leptostylopsis cristatus Fisher, 1925

= Leptostylopsis cristatus =

Species of beetle

Leptostylopsis cristatus is a species of longhorn beetles of the subfamily Lamiinae found in the Dominican Republic. It was described by Fisher in 1925.
