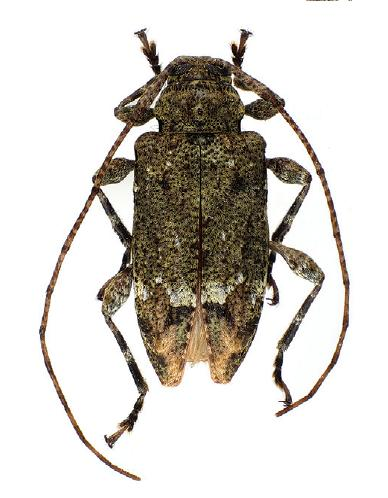

Scientific classification
- Kingdom: Animalia
- Phylum: Arthropoda
- Clade: Pancrustacea
- Class: Insecta
- Order: Coleoptera
- Suborder: Polyphaga
- Infraorder: Cucujiformia
- Family: Cerambycidae
- Genus: Leptostylopsis
- Species: L. thomasi

Binomial name
- Leptostylopsis thomasi Lingafelter & Micheli, 2009

= Leptostylopsis thomasi =

Species of beetle

Leptostylopsis thomasi is a species of longhorn beetle in the subfamily Lamiinae. It is native to Haiti and the Dominican Republic on the island of Hispaniola. It was described by Lingafelter and Micheli in 2009.
