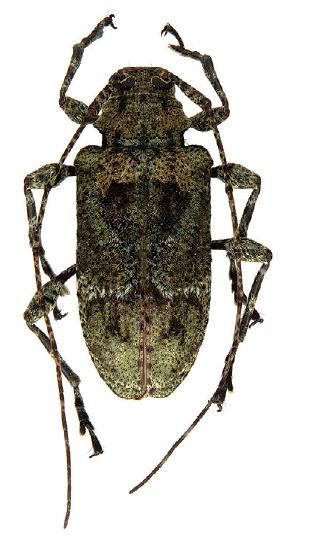

Scientific classification
- Kingdom: Animalia
- Phylum: Arthropoda
- Clade: Pancrustacea
- Class: Insecta
- Order: Coleoptera
- Suborder: Polyphaga
- Infraorder: Cucujiformia
- Family: Cerambycidae
- Genus: Leptostylopsis
- Species: L. viridicomus

Binomial name
- Leptostylopsis viridicomus Fisher, 1942

= Leptostylopsis viridicomus =

Species of beetle

Leptostylopsis viridicomus is a species of longhorn beetles of the subfamily Lamiinae. It was described by Fisher in 1942.
