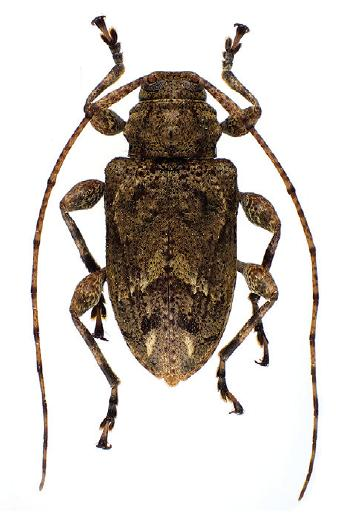

Scientific classification
- Domain: Eukaryota
- Kingdom: Animalia
- Phylum: Arthropoda
- Class: Insecta
- Order: Coleoptera
- Suborder: Polyphaga
- Infraorder: Cucujiformia
- Family: Cerambycidae
- Genus: Leptostylopsis
- Species: L. milleri

Binomial name
- Leptostylopsis milleri Fisher, 1932

= Leptostylopsis milleri =

Species of beetle

Leptostylopsis milleri is a species of longhorn beetles of the subfamily Lamiinae. It was described by Fisher in 1932.
