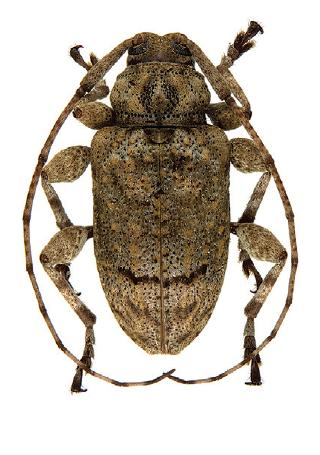

Scientific classification
- Domain: Eukaryota
- Kingdom: Animalia
- Phylum: Arthropoda
- Class: Insecta
- Order: Coleoptera
- Suborder: Polyphaga
- Infraorder: Cucujiformia
- Family: Cerambycidae
- Genus: Leptostylopsis
- Species: L. terraecolor

Binomial name
- Leptostylopsis terraecolor (Horn, 1880)

Synonyms
- Leptostylopsis mutilus (Casey, 1913)

= Leptostylopsis terraecolor =

Species of beetle

Leptostylopsis terraecolor is a species of flat-faced longhorn in the beetle family Cerambycidae. It is found in North America.
