= President of Ethiopia =

Head of state

President of The Federal Democratic Republic of Ethiopia
Name in national languages
- - Amharic: የኢትዮጵያ ፕሬዝዳንት; Ye-Ītyōṗṗyā pirēzidanit
  - Oromo: Pireezidaantiin Itiyoophiyaa
  - Somali: Madaxweynaha Itoobiya
  - Tigrinya: ፕረዚደንት ኢትዮጵያ prezident Ítiyop'iya
  - Afar: Itiyoppiya Pirezdant
- Emblem

- Flag of Ethiopia

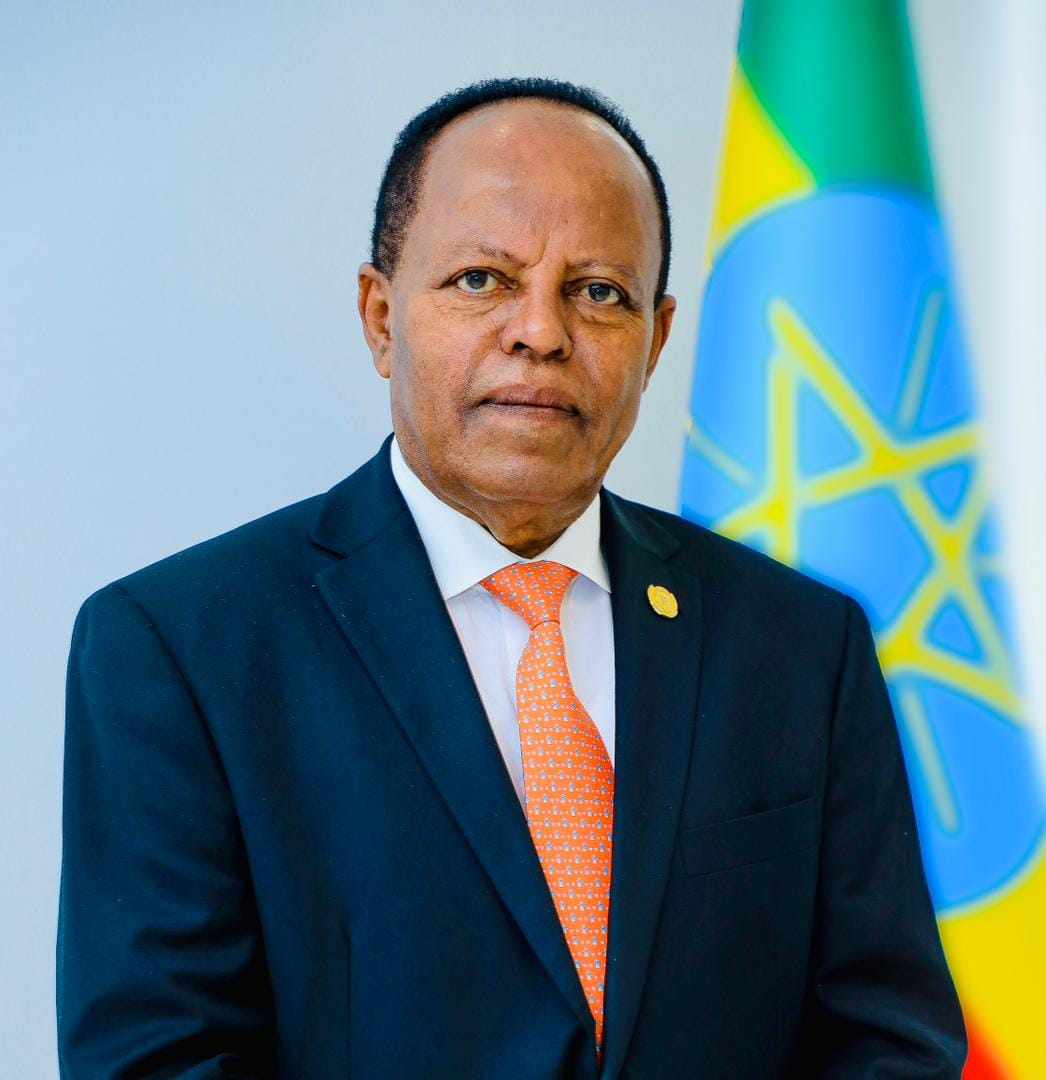
- Incumbent; Taye Atske Selassie since 7 October 2024
- Style: Honourable President (Within Ethiopia); Mr. President (Informal); His Excellency (Diplomatic)
- Type: Head of State
- Residence: National Palace, Addis Ababa
- Appointer: Federal Parliamentary Assembly
- Term length: Six years
- Constituting instrument: Constitution of Ethiopia (1995)
- Precursor: The Emperor of Ethiopia
- Formation: 15 September 1974; 52 years ago (de facto); 10 September 1987; 39 years ago (de jure)
- First holder: Negasso Gidada (FDRE); Mengistu Haile Mariam (PDRE); Aman Andom (PMGSE)
- Deputy: Abolished, Vice President of Ethiopia
- Website: Official website

The president of Ethiopia is the head of state of Ethiopia. The position is largely ceremonial with executive power vested in the Council of Ministers chaired by the prime minister. The current president is Taye Atske Selassie, who took office on 7 October 2024. Presidents are elected by the Federal Parliamentary Assembly for six years.

== History ==
The role of head of state of Ethiopia had evolved and changed through the political transformation of Ethiopia. The emperor of Ethiopia was the head of state of Ethiopia prior the 1974 revolution. Following the 1974 military coup and abolishment of the monarchies of Ethiopia, the role of head of state was fulfilled by the chairman of the Provisional Military Government of Socialist Ethiopia as de facto president of Ethiopia.

=== Provisional Military Government of Socialist Ethiopia (PMGSE) – (1974–1987) ===
The chairman of the Provisional Military Government of Socialist Ethiopia was head of state and de facto president of Ethiopia. The first chairman of the Provisional Military Government was Lieutenant General Aman Andom, who was also Chief of General Staff of the Ethiopian Armed forces.

=== People's Democratic Republic of Ethiopia (PDRE) – (1987–1991) ===
The presidency was officially created by the 1987 Constitution, which established the People's Democratic Republic of Ethiopia. The president was elected to a five-year term by the National Shengo (legislature), with no term limits. The presidency was the chief executive of Ethiopia. The president was also the chairman of the Council of State, which presided as a legislator during the Shengo off session. The president had a chief executive power to rule by decree if necessary and was also the commander-in-chief of the Ethiopian Armed Forces. The only president under the 1987 Constitution was Mengistu Haile-Mariam from 1987 to 1991. Following the flight into exile of Mengistu Haile-Mariam, Tesfaye Gebre Kidan served as the acting president of Ethiopia for only six days.

=== Transitional Government of Ethiopia (TGE) – (1991–1995) ===
The end of the Ethiopian Civil War on 28 May 1991 resulted in the end to the People's Democratic Republic of Ethiopia constitution. A new provisional constitution and the Transitional Government of Ethiopia was formed. The Transitional Government of Ethiopia was a de facto semi-presidential system with the president as head of state and the prime minister as head of government. During the Transitional Government of Ethiopia, the presidency had chief executive powers, including appointing and dismissing the prime minister and the commander-in-chief of the Ethiopian Armed Forces. The only president who served during the Transitional Government of Ethiopia was Meles Zenawi.

=== Federal Democratic Republic of Ethiopia (FDRE) – (1995–present) ===
A draft of a new constitution was declared in 1995 as the Constitution of the Federal Democratic Republic of Ethiopia. The 1995 Constitution of Ethiopia transformed Ethiopia into a parliamentary republic, which effectively made the presidency a ceremonial and apolitical head of state.

The Constitution of the Federal Democratic Republic of Ethiopia explicitly vests executive power in the Council of Ministers and names the prime minister as chief executive and the de jure commander-in-chief of the Ethiopian Armed Forces. However, the president presides as a ceremonial commander-in-chief of the Ethiopian Armed Forces.

The first president of the Federal Democratic Republic of Ethiopia was Negasso Gidada, who served from 1995 to 2001. Sahle-Work Zewde was the first female president who had served from 2018 to 2024. The current president is Taye Atske Selassie since 7 October 2024.

== Nominations and appointment of the president ==
The Federal Parliamentary Assembly nominate the candidate for president. Presidential tenure is not keyed to that of the Federal Parliamentary Assembly to assure continuity in government and the nonpartisan character of the office.

The term of office of the president is six years. The term limit given in article 70 of the Constitution is two terms. Upon election in accordance with the constitution, the president, before commencing their responsibility as president, presents himself or herself before the Federal Parliamentary Assembly and makes a declaration of loyalty to the Constitution and the people of Ethiopia in the following words:

"I......., when on this date commence my responsibility as President of the Federal Democratic Republic, of Ethiopia, pledge to carry out faithfully the high responsibility entrusted to me."

== Powers and duties ==
The 1995 Ethiopian Constitution lays out the duties and powers of the president of the republic to include the following:

1. The president opens the joint session of the Federal Parliamentary Assembly at the commencement of their annual sessions.
2. The president proclaims in the Negarit Gazeta laws and international agreements approved by the House of Peoples' Representatives in accordance with the Constitution.
3. The president, upon recommendation by the prime minister, appoints ambassadors and other envoys to represent the country abroad.
4. The president receives the credentials of foreign ambassadors and special envoys.
5. The president awards medals, prizes and gifts in accordance with conditions and procedures established by law.
6. The president upon recommendation by the prime minister, grants high military titles and awards.
7. The president, in accordance with conditions and procedures established by law, grants pardon.

The president's powers and duties need not be countersigned by the prime minister to be valid. All the listed roles are autonomous powers of the president. The president represents the country in various delegations, meetings, and international platforms that may require the attendance of the head of state.

== Succession ==
If the president is unable to preside and exercise their duties because of illness, death, resignation, conviction or impeachment, the two chambers of the Federal Parliamentary Assembly will immediately designate an acting president. With no longer than a week time the Federal Parliamentary Assembly will convene by an extraordinary session to elect the successor and declare the new president.

== Security ==
The president of Ethiopia is protected by the Republican Guard, which is a special armed unit of the Ethiopian National Defense Force. The Republican Guard's Counter Military Unit is responsible for protecting the presidential palace commonly known as Jubilee Palace. The Counter Military Unit carries heavy assault rifles such as Israel-made Tavor-21 and American M-4's and long range snipers that can penetrate bullet proof glass. The Republican Guard also uses helicopters as well as armored vehicles.

== See also ==
- Emperor of Ethiopia
  - List of emperors of Ethiopia
- List of presidents of Ethiopia
- List of heads of government of Ethiopia
- Rulers of Ethiopia
- Vice President of Ethiopia
