= Atnafu Abate =

Ethiopian Officer and Leading Derg member (1931–1977)

Lieutenant Colonel Atnafu Abate አጥናፉ አባተ
- Born: 31 January 1931; Bichena, Gojjam, Ethiopian Empire
- Died: 11 November 1977 (aged 46); Addis Ababa, Ethiopia
- Military career
- Allegiance: Ethiopian Empire
- Branch: Army
- Rank: Lieutenant Colonel
- Unit: Fourth Division

Lieutenant Colonel Atnafu Abate (Ge'ez: አጥናፉ አባተ; 31 January 1931 – 12 November 1977) was an Ethiopian military officer and a leading member of the Derg, the military junta which deposed Emperor Haile Selassie and ruled the country for several years.

== Early life ==
Atnafu Abate was born in Bichena, Gojjam and was the son of an Amhara clergyman. He joined the Ethiopian army and was educated at Holetta Military Academy. At the time of the Ethiopian Revolution, he was serving as a major in the Fourth Division, stationed in Addis Ababa. (He became a Lieutenant Colonel after April 1975.)

== Career ==
By April 1974 he had joined the group of army and police officers led by Colonel Alem Zewde Tessema of the Airborne Corps, playing a major role in organizing them into a coordinating committee on 24 April, which was officially disbanded five days later to be replaced by the 25-member National Security Commission under the command of the Minister of Defense Abiye Abebe. At some point during the following month a second coordinating committee emerged, whose leading members included, besides Major Atnafu, Major Tefera Tekleab of the Engineering Corps, Major Fisseha Desta of the elite Kebur Zabangna, Girma Fisseha of the Army Aviation, and Captain Sisay Hapte of the Air Force. This second committee is better known under its later name, the Derg. Colonel Alem Zewde fell from power at this time, losing control of his paratrooper battalion after its defeat in a battle with radicals on 22. June and afterwards fleeing to Gojjam.

Within a month Tafara Tekleab, who Rene Lafort states was "probably more than any other the father of the Derg", was replaced and Atnafu became the chairperson of the first meetings of the Derg (according to Paulos, Tafara Tekleab was not imprisoned preceding his execution as some believe, but rather he served some months after the Establishment of Derg under Mengistu Hailemariam as an influential member of the Derg. He clashed with Mengistu over a rebellion of his Engineering corps' headquarters in Addis Abeba near the Headquarters of the ground forces at Tor Hailoche. Following this he was imprisoned for about 9 years from 1974 to 1984 and then released and integrated into the Military Engineering and Construction corps).

It was at this point that one of the delegates from the Third Division, Major Mengistu Haile Mariam, made a speech which won him the support of the members of the Derg. LaFort observes that "above all he [Mengistu] seems to have been one of the very few to propose a coherent and energetic line of action in debates which were, to say the least, confused and long winded in a style which went down well with this assembly of NCOs and other ranks." Mengistu then proposed that the chairman and Vice-Chairman of the Derg be elected by secret ballot, a move Atnafu opposed but was overruled; the result of the election put Mengistu at the head of the Derg with Atnafu as his deputy.

The Ottaways point out that Lt. Col. Atnafu was seen as "A symbol of the rebellion of a conservative, nationalistic, and religious peasantry against the corruption and abuses of the aristocracy. ... He early projected the image of the officer devoted to the traditional values of motherland, flag and church." Over the next few years, general opinion believed that the two officers—Atnafu and Mengistu—were engaged in a bitter rivalry for control of the shadowy Derg. "The relationship between the two vice-chairmen was always slightly mysterious," notes the Ottaways. "The two were rumoured to be bitter enemies from the beginning, to the point of pulling guns on each other in meetings. Yet, Atnafu always seemed to be on Mengistu's side at times of major crisis within the Derg." He directed the effort in May 1976 to recruit, arm and train tens of thousands of peasants who would serve as a militia to supplement the weary soldiers of the regular army fighting at the Eritrean front. However, when that effort, known as Operation Raza, ended with heavy losses, both Atnafu and Mengistu were blamed for the failure. After a brief struggle when it appeared that Captain Sisay Hapte might gain control of the Derg—but was executed—at the beginning of December Atnafu was shunted out of direct competition for power by being made organizer of the militia.

== Death ==
Atnafu was arrested on 11 November 1977 in the Derg’s headquarters (the Grand Palace) in Addis Ababa on orders of Mengistu. He was executed the following day (12 November) by a firing squad, and his death was publicly announced on official state radio on 13 November, jointly with the publication of a six-page ideological indictment justifying his execution as a necessary revolutionary measure.

Atnafu had avoided the infamous Derg meeting of 3 February 1977, where a number of Derg leaders, including chairman Lieutenant General Tafari Benti, were killed in an ambush orchestrated by Mengistu, having left the capital to personally present a flag to a militia unit that had completed its training. This coup left Atnafu the sole remaining Derg member with a measure of independence from Mengistu. Most experts believe that Atnafu's days were numbered, and his execution that November was inevitable. "The execution of Atnafu," observes historian Bahru Zewde, "who more than anybody else symbolized the Derg from its early origins in February 1974, effectively marked the eclipse of that organization."

However, LaFort presents an intriguing dissenting opinion on the dynamics linking these events. First he presents a portrait of Atnafu as having become exhausted with his responsibilities. LaFort elaborates:

Three and a half years of revolution had physically worn him to the bone. The man who had entered the picture books of the revolution with raised fist and contorted face had become one who simply asked: pax. he advocated internal reconciliation: the ending of all terrors, 'White' and 'Red', extending the hand to both the EPRP and MEISON, external relations that were more balanced between the two great powers (he seems to have sounded out the United States about this during September) -- and pacifying the army by satisfying its main demands.

Although public rumor had it that tensions between the two men was so high that Atnafu had to undergo a close search before entering Mengistu's offices, LaFort reminds us that since he was put in charge of the militia late the previous year, Atnafu had no longer posed a danger to Mengistu, writing that "Atnafu had quite clearly abandoned the pursuit of power to a technical task, the raising, organization, and training of the militia." Pointing out that Mengistu had left the final meeting which ended with Atnafu's death before the decision had been made, and that Mengistu had fought for Atnafu as long as he could without putting himself in danger, LaFort argues that Atnafu's execution "appears as a sacrifice, offered up on the altar of defeat in need of a scapegoat, the price of the apparent compromise reached between the Derg, the regular army and the various factions within the latter."
