= Derg =

Military junta of Ethiopia (1974–1987)

Provisional Military Government of Socialist Ethiopia የኅብረተሰብአዊት ፡ ኢትዮጵያ ፡ ጊዜያዊ ፡ ወታደራዊ ፡ መንግሥት (Amharic) Yä-ḫəbrätäsäbʼawit ʼItyoṗya Gizeyawi Wätadärawi Mängəśt
- 1974–1987
- Top: State flag (1974–1975); Bottom: State flag (1975–1987) Emblem
- Anthem: ኢትዮጵያ ፣ ኢትዮጵያ ፣ ኢትዮጵያ ፡ ቅደሚ; Ītyoṗya, Ītyoṗya, Ītyoṗya, qidä mī (English: "Ethiopia, Ethiopia, Ethiopia be first")
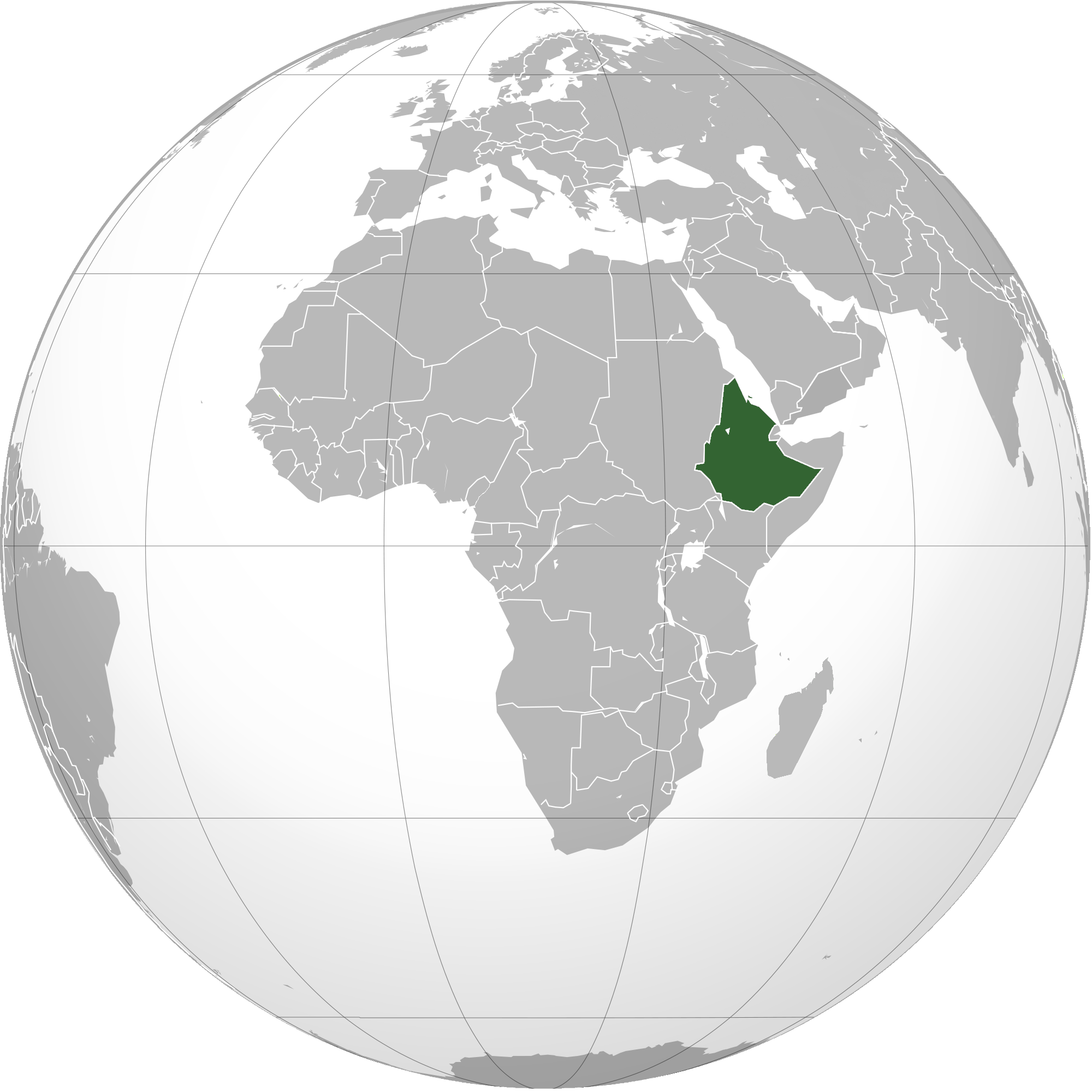
- Capital: Addis Ababa
- Official languages: Amharic
- Religion: State atheism
- Demonym: Ethiopian
- Government: Unitary provisional communist state under a military junta
- Head of state
  - 1974: Aman Andom (acting)
  - 1974: Mengistu Haile Mariam (acting)
  - 1974–1977: Tafari Benti
  - 1977–1987: Mengistu Haile Mariam
- Spokesman
  - 1974: Aman Andom
- King of Ethiopia
  - 1974–1975 (Note: In exile and never recognised the title.): Amha Selassie
- Legislature: None (rule by decree)
- Historical era: Cold War
  - Coup d'état: 12 September 1974
  - Monarchy abolished: 21 March 1975
  - Constitution adopted: 22 February 1987

Area
- 1987: 1,221,900 km^{2} (471,800 sq mi)

Population
  - 1987: 46,706,229
- Currency: Ethiopian birr (ETB)
- Calling code: +251
- ISO 3166 code: ET
Preceded by	Succeeded by
Ethiopian Empire	People's Democratic Republic of Ethiopia
- Today part of: Ethiopia; Eritrea

The Derg or Dergue (Amharic: ደርግ, romanized: Därg, lit. 'committee' or 'council'), officially the Provisional Military Administrative Council (PMAC), and also often simply known as Socialist Ethiopia, was the military junta that ruled Ethiopia (which at that time included present-day Eritrea) from 1974 to 1987, when its members formally "civilianized" the administration, though they remained in power until 1991.

The Derg was established on 21 June 1974 as the Coordinating Committee of the Armed Forces, Police and Territorial Army, by junior and mid-level officers of the Imperial Ethiopian Army and members of the police. The officers decided everything collectively at first, and selected Mengistu Haile Mariam to chair the proceedings. On 12 September 1974, the Derg overthrew the government of the Ethiopian Empire and Emperor Haile Selassie during nationwide mass protests, and three days later formally renamed itself the Provisional Military Administrative Council. In March 1975 the Derg abolished the monarchy and established Ethiopia as a communist state under a military-led provisional government embarking on a national democratic revolution. The abolition of feudalism, increased literacy, nationalization, and sweeping land reform including the resettlement and villagization from the Ethiopian Highlands became priorities. Mengistu became chairman in 1977, launching the Red Terror (ቀይ ሽብር Qäy Shəbbər) political repression campaign to eliminate political opponents, with tens of thousands imprisoned and executed without trial. During the time of the Derg, it operated under a unitary form of government.

By the mid-1980s Ethiopia was plagued by multiple issues; these included droughts, economic decline and increasing reliance on foreign aid, recovery from the Ogaden War, and the 1983–1985 famine—from the latter of which the Derg itself estimated more than a million deaths during its time in power. Conflicts between the Derg and various ethnic militias saw a gradual resurgence, particularly the Ethiopian Civil War and the Eritrean War of Independence. Mengistu formally abolished the Derg in 1987 and formed a Marxist-Leninist one-party state, the People's Democratic Republic of Ethiopia led by the Workers' Party of Ethiopia, with a new government containing civilians but still dominated by members of the Derg.

In May 1991, the Derg regime fell to the Ethiopian People's Revolutionary Democratic Front, ending the civil war that had been ongoing since 1974 following the toppling of the Ethiopian Empire.

== History ==
Before the revolution, the Ethiopian Student Movement presented a threat to the monarchy. Many of their ideals were similar to those of the Derg.

=== Formation and growth ===
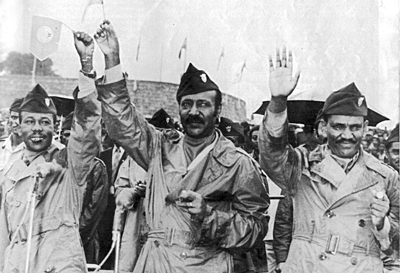
High ranking Derg members: Mengistu Haile Mariam, Tafari Benti and Atnafu Abate

After the Ethiopian Revolution in February 1974, the first signal of any mass uprisings was the actions of the soldiers of the 4th Brigade of the 4th Army Division in Nagelle in southern Ethiopia. They were mainly unhappy about the lack of food and water and then arrested their brigade commander and other officers and kept them incarcerated. When the government sent the commander of the Ethiopian Ground Forces, General Deresse Dubala, to negotiate with the rebels, they held him and forced him to eat their food and drink their water. Similar mutinies took place at the Ethiopian Air Force base at Bishoftu on 12 February, and at Second Division at Asmara on 25 February. It was these protests that gave rise to the general uprising among the civilian segments such as students and trade unions.

The Coordinating Committee of the Armed Forces, Police and Territorial Army, known as the Derg, was officially announced on 28 June 1974 by a group of military officers. This was done under the pretext of maintaining law and order, due to the powerlessness of the civilian government following widespread mutiny in the armed forces of Ethiopia earlier that year. Its members were not directly involved in those mutinies nor was this the first military committee organized to support the administration of Prime Minister Endelkachew Makonnen. Alem Zewde Tessema had established the armed forces coordinated committee on 23 March. Over the following months, radicals in the Ethiopian military came to believe Makonnen was acting on behalf of the hated feudal aristocracy. When a group of notables petitioned for the release of a number of government ministers and officials who were under arrest for corruption and other crimes, three days later the Derg was announced.

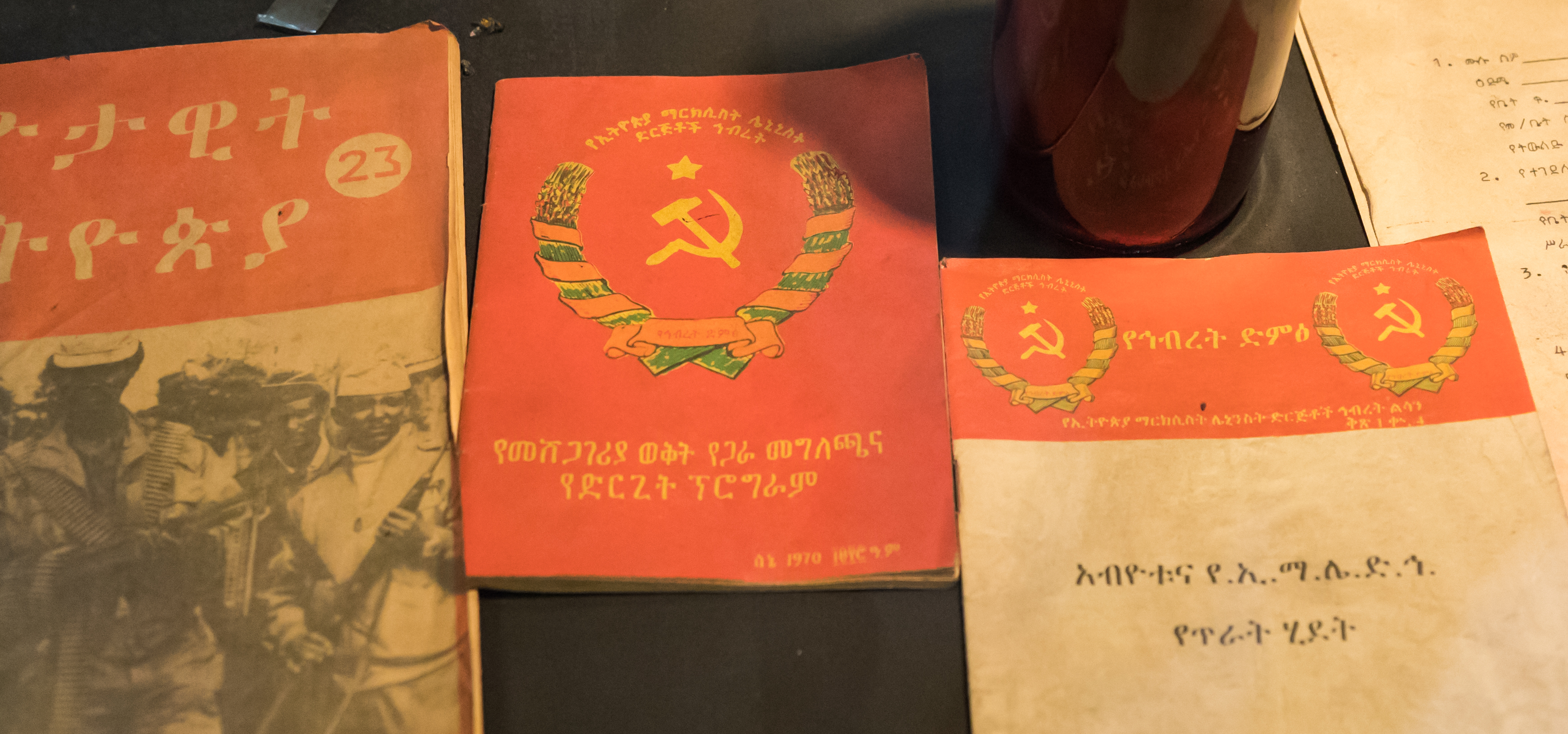
Advocacy manifesto of the Derg, published in June 1978

The Derg, which originally consisted of soldiers at the capital, broadened its membership by including representatives from the 40 units of the Army, Air Force, Navy, Kebur Zabagna (Imperial Guard), Territorial Army and police: each unit was expected to send three representatives, who were supposed to be privates, NCOs and junior officers up to the rank of major. According to Bahru Zewde, "Senior officers were deemed too compromised by close association to the regime." The Derg was reported to have consisted of 120 soldiers, a statement which has gained wide acceptance due to the habitual secretiveness of the Derg in its early years. But, Bahru Zewde notes that "in actual fact, their number was less than 110", and Aregawi Berhe mentions two different sources which record 109 persons as being members of the Derg. No new members were ever admitted, and the number decreased, especially in the first few years, as some members were expelled or killed.

The Derg first assembled at the Fourth Division headquarters, and elected Major Mengistu Haile Mariam as its chairman and Major Atnafu Abate as vice-chairman. Their stated mission was to study and address the grievances of various military units, investigate abuses by senior officers and staff and root out corruption in the military. In July, the Derg obtained key concessions from emperor, Haile Selassie, which included the power to arrest not only military officers but government officials at every level. Soon both former Prime Ministers Aklilu Habte-Wold and Endelkachew Makonnen, along with most of their cabinets, most regional governors, many senior military officers and officials of the Imperial court were imprisoned. In August, after a proposed constitution creating a constitutional monarchy was presented to the emperor, the Derg began a program of dismantling the imperial government to forestall further developments in that direction. The Derg deposed and imprisoned the emperor on 12 September 1974.

The Derg initially lacked a clear ideological commitment other than Ethiopian nationalism. As left-wing activists returned to Ethiopia in the summer of 1974, their ideologies became entrenched in Ethiopian society, and the Derg began adopting the ideology of Marxism-Leninism and Ethiopian Socialism from these leftist parties, seeing it as their mission to implement the demands of the popular uprising.

On 15 September, the committee renamed itself the Provisional Military Administrative Council (PMAC) and took full control of the government and all facilities within the government. PMAC said it was only a provisional administration, and months passed before the full force of the civilian opposition gained momentum. In the first major outbreak of opposition, on May Day 1975, soldiers killed some protesters who demanding a return to civilian government. Throughout 1974, since the overthrow of Emperor Selassie, underground student cells and the leadership of the Confederation of Ethiopian Labor Unions (CELU) had united to form an alliance militantly opposed to the PMAC. The EPRP demanded an elected assembly and the immediate establishment of a people's democratic republic. The Derg responded to all this by repressions and suppression of anti-government protests, and formally disbanded the CELU in December. The Derg chose Lieutenant General Aman Andom, a popular military leader and a Sandhurst graduate, to be its chairman and acting head-of-state. This was pending the return of Crown Prince Asfaw Wossen from medical treatment in Europe when he would assume the throne as a constitutional monarch. However, General Aman Andom quarreled with the radical elements in the Derg over the issue of a new military offensive in Eritrea and their proposal to execute the high officials of Selassie's former government. After eliminating units loyal to him—the Engineers, the Imperial Bodyguard and the Air Force—the Derg removed General Aman from power and killed him on 23 November 1974, along with some of his supporters and 60 officials of the previous Imperial government, what became known as the Massacre of the Sixty.

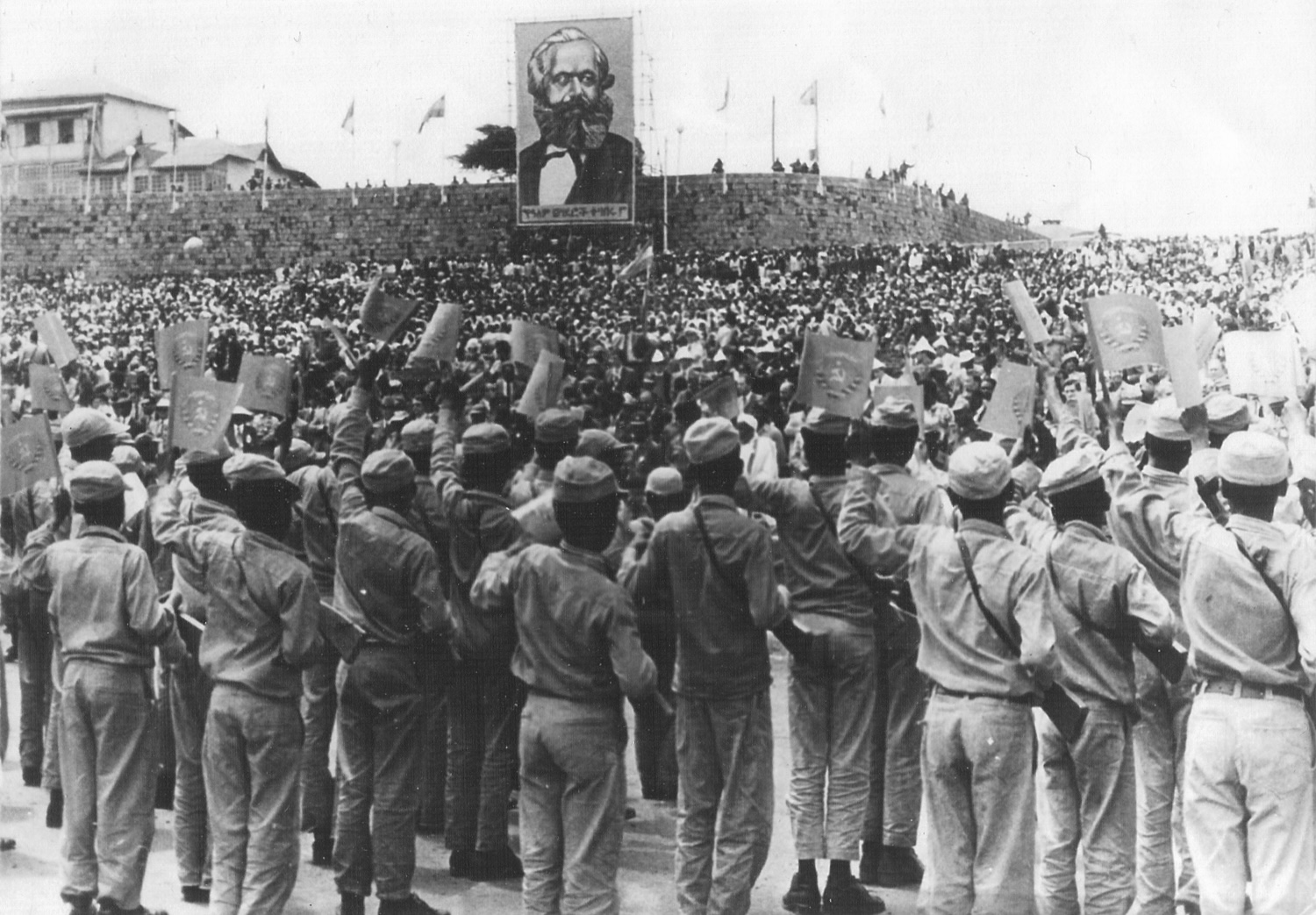
Ethiopian army soldiers rally in support of the Derg; many of them holding advocacy manifestos of the regime.

Brigadier General Tafari Benti became the new Chairman of the Derg and the head of state, with Mengistu and Atnafu Abate as his two vice-chairmen, both with promotions to the rank of Lieutenant-Colonel. The monarchy was formally abolished in March 1975, and socialism was proclaimed the new ideology of the state. Emperor Haile Selassie died under mysterious circumstances on 27 August 1975 while his personal physician was absent. It is commonly believed that Mengistu killed him, either by ordering it done or by his own hand although the former is considered more likely. Both Derg and Haile Selassie government relocated numerous Amharas into southern Ethiopia, including present-day of the Oromia region, where they served in government administration, courts, church and school, where Oromo texts were eliminated and replaced by Amharic.

=== Red Terror's campaign ===
From 1976 to 1978, the Derg conducted a very brutal military campaign to suppress its potential opponents, not only separatist movements but also rival Marxist-Leninist groups (as EPRP or MEISON). The campaign officially began on September 23, following a failed assassination attempt on an influential member and future leader of the Derg, Mengistu Haile Mariam, by the Ethiopian People's Revolutionary Party (according to the Derg). By this time, the EPRP was very active in killing Derg members and supporters across the country, including the capital Addis Ababa. Many EPRP members were among the hundreds of thousands of people killed in the government campaign, causing the EPRP's activities to be significantly curtailed. In less than two years (1976–1978) of the Red Terror campaign, according to the highest estimates, up to 980,000 people were killed.

=== Under Mengistu's leadership ===
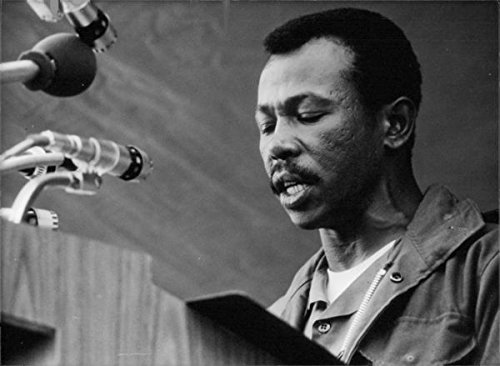
Mengistu Haile Mariam giving a speech

Mengistu did not emerge as the leader of the Derg until after the 3 February 1977 shootout, in which Chairman Tafari Benti was killed. The vice-chairman of the Derg, Atnafu Abate, clashed with Mengistu over the issue of how to handle the war in Eritrea and lost, leading to his execution with 40 other officers, clearing the way for Mengistu to assume control. He formally assumed power as head of state, and justified his execution of Abate (on 13 November of that year) by claiming that he had "placed the interests of Ethiopia above the interests of socialism" and undertaken other "counter-revolutionary" activities. Mengistu intensified the junta's repression during the Red Terror and his army's military operations in Eritrea: the Red Terror campaign intensified after he came to power and claimed more lives than before, about 500,000 people, according to Amnesty International. By the end of 1979, Mengistu, “the Chairman,” was being projected through the official media in a strong totalitarian light. He derived from his earlier years an exceptional acquaintance with the regional diversity of Ethiopia. Many who have met him attest to his great calmness, a cool realism that has enabled him to overcome the many problems which he has faced.

In 1987, he formally dissolved the Derg and established the country as the People's Democratic Republic of Ethiopia (PDRE) under a new constitution. Many of the Derg members remained in key government posts and also served as the members of the Central Committee and the Politburo of the Workers' Party of Ethiopia (WPE). This became Ethiopia's civilian version of the Eastern bloc communist parties. Mengistu became Secretary-General of the WPE and President of the PDRE while remaining the Commander in Chief of the Armed Forces and the undisputed totalitarian dictator of Ethiopia.

==== Ethiopian Civil War ====
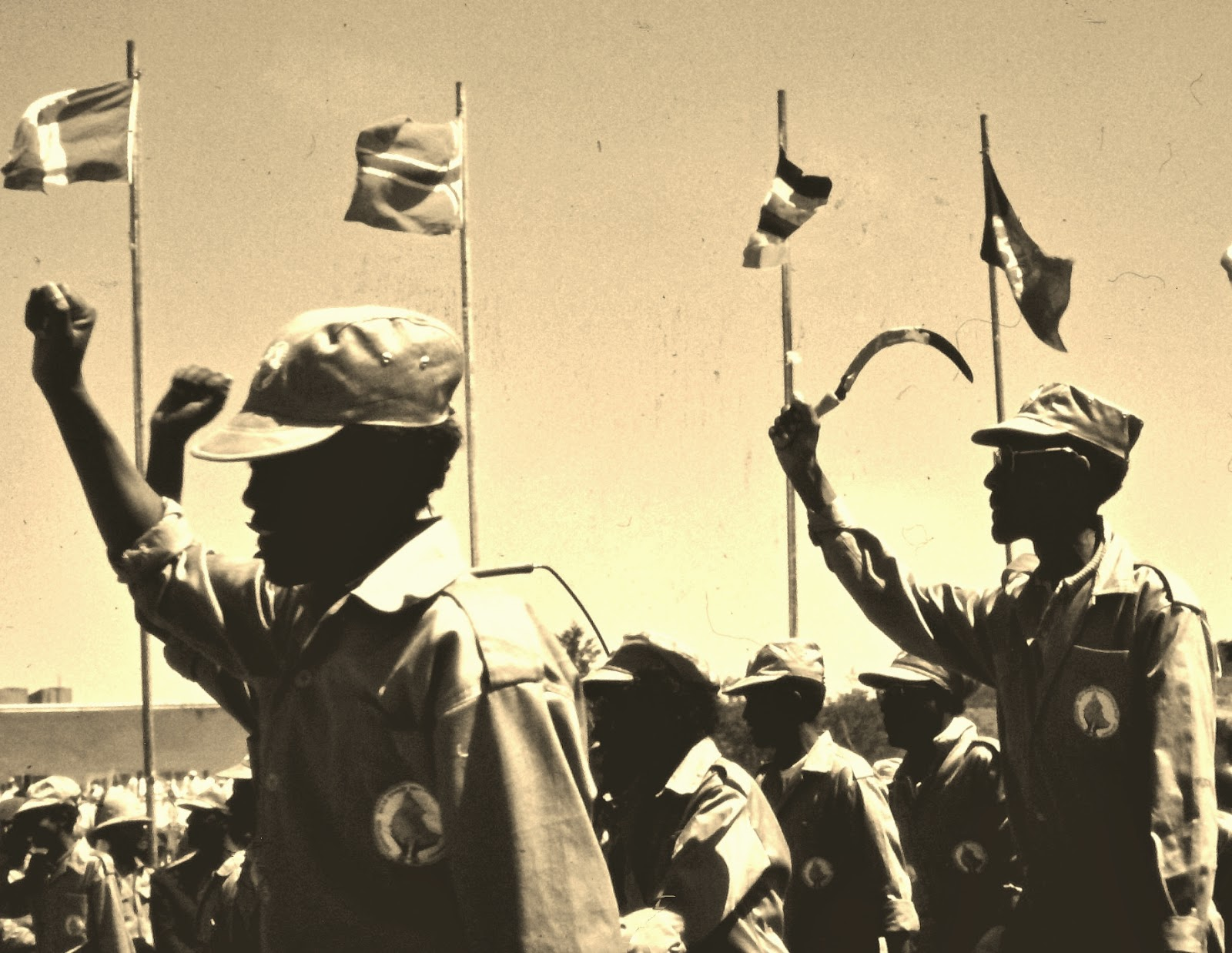
Ethiopian soldiers at pro-government rally.

Opposition to the reign of the Derg was the main cause of the Ethiopian Civil War. This conflict began as extralegal violence between 1976 and 1978, known as the Red Terror, when the Derg struggled for authority, first with various opposition groups within the country, then with a variety of groups jockeying for the role of vanguard party. Though human rights violations were committed by all sides, the great majority of abuses against civilians as well as actions leading to devastating famine were committed by the government. The Derg spied on Ethiopian citizens through its secret police, the Central Revolutionary Investigation Department.

The Ethiopian Orthodox Church, which represents the Christian state church of Ethiopia for centuries, was disestablished in 1974. The Derg declared a policy of state atheism, a tenet of Marxist-Leninist ideology; this was opposed by the vast majority of the Ethiopian population.

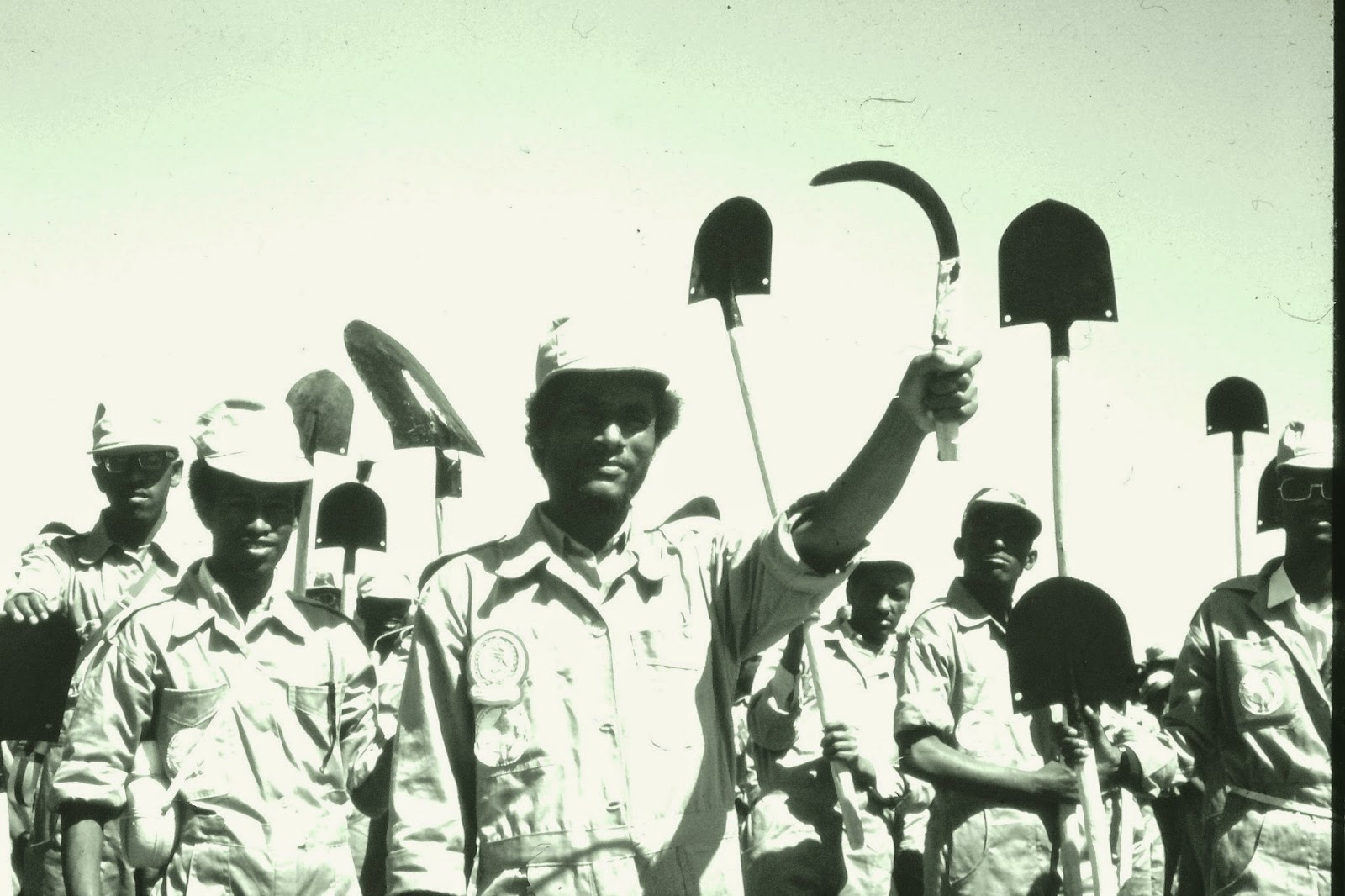
Ethiopian soldiers at a pro-government rally with sickles and shovels, symbolizing (partly) communism.

On 4 March 1975, the Derg announced a program of land reform, according to its main slogan of "Land to the Tiller", which was unequivocally radical, even in Soviet and Chinese terms. It nationalized all rural land, abolished tenancy and put peasants in charge of enforcing the whole scheme. Many students embraced Mengistu as a 'the hero of the reform'. But in 1980, state farms and cooperatives combined accounted for only 6 percent of agricultural output and 20 percent of marketed production. The Derg's policies had particularly strong effects on factories: by mid-1970s, workers raised widespread demands for shop-floor control over production, but the government repelled them. Strikes, illegal since junta come to power, were prohibited in the 1975 Labor Code. The housing law also encountered serious difficulties: the nationalization led to a net subtraction of the number of dwellings available for rental. The kebeles did carry out some housing redistribution and welfare programs, but they were unable to provide a sufficient set of retail outlets for food to offset the shortages and hoarding. In addition, the Derg in 1975 nationalized most industries and somewhat secured urban real-estate holdings. Mismanagement, corruption and general opposition to the Derg's dictatorial and violent communist rule, coupled with the draining effects of constant warfare with the separatist guerrilla movements in Eritrea and Tigray, led to a drastic fall in general productivity of food and cash crops. Eritreans came under increased oppression and economic disruption at the hands of the regime. In July 1976, the group who wanted a rapprochement with the EPRP was eliminated from the Derg: In the same month junta introduced the death penalty for some political crimes, and prolonged the state of emergency proclaimed in September 1975. As a result, insurgencies began to spread into the country's administrative regions. By late 1976 insurgencies existed in all of the country's fourteen administrative regions.

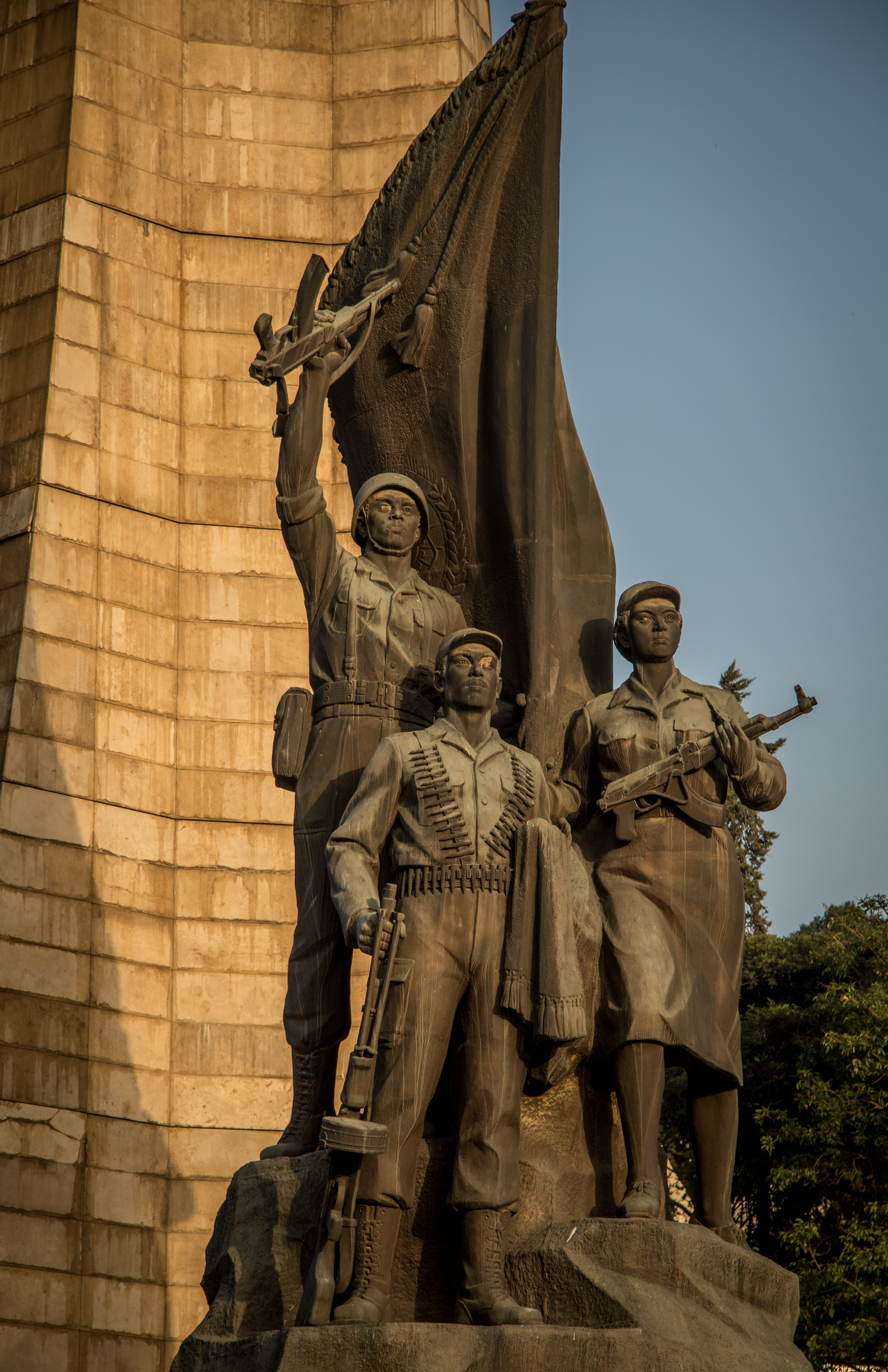
Tiglachin Monument commemorating the victory of the Derg over Somalia in the Ogaden War

During 1976, civilian opposition to the regime was ruthlessly cracked down on following an attempt on Mengistu's life. In some cases entire families were executed based on the accusation of being 'reactionary'. These grouped ranged from the conservative and pro-monarchy Ethiopian Democratic Union to the far-leftist Ethiopian People's Revolutionary Party, the Eritrean People's Liberation Front (EPLF) guerrillas fighting for Eritrean independence, rebels based in Tigray (which included the nascent Tigray People's Liberation Front) and other groups. For some time, the Western Somali Liberation Front (WSLF), had been conducting guerrilla operations in the Ogaden. By June 1977, it had succeeded in forcing the Ethiopian army out of much of the region and into fortified urban centers. During the Ogaden War that soon followed, Somalia launched a full-scale invasion to assist the WSLF. Under the Derg, Ethiopia became the Soviet bloc's closest ally in Africa and became one of the best-armed nations in the region as a result of massive military aid, chiefly from the Soviet Union, East Germany, Cuba and North Korea. In October 1978, the Derg announced the National Revolutionary Development Campaign to mobilize human and material resources to transform the economy, which led to a ten-year plan (1984/85 – 1993/94) to expand agricultural and industrial output, forecasting a 6.5% growth in GDP and a 3.6% rise in per capita income. Instead, per capita income declined considerably to 0.8% over this period. Because of the impact of the wars in Ogaden and Eritrea, food output did not even keep pace with population growth in the 1974-1978 period. Between 1977 and 1979 Ethiopia faced severe food shortages, both in the towns and in parts of the countryside.

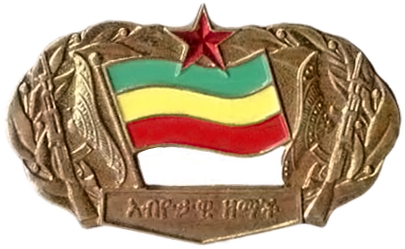
Derg party badge, c. 1979.

Many Ethiopians viewed the revolution as a mask to perpetuate Amhara colonization that began during Emperor Menelik II. By 1978 the proportion of Amhara officials running the Ethiopian government was higher than it has ever been – even under Menelik and Selassie. By 1980, the original 120 members of the Derg had been whittled down to only 38. All members but three were ethnic Amhara and were predominantly from settler colonialist neftenya origins. Many member of the ruling elite were deeply opposed to the idea of loosening control on the rebellious southern regions conquered under Menelik II.

==== 1983–85 famine ====
Famine scholar Alex de Waal observed that while the famine that struck the country in the mid-1980s is usually ascribed to drought, closer investigation shows that widespread drought occurred only some months after the famine was already underway. Hundreds of thousands fled economic misery, conscription and political repression and went to live in neighbouring countries and all over the Western world, creating, for the first time, an Ethiopian diaspora.

More accurate evidence suggests that the famine was deliberately induced by the government in rebel areas of the Ethiopia (such as Tigray and Eritrea) as part of the junta's counterinsurgency strategy against guerrilla such groups as Tigray People's Liberation Front or Oromo Liberation Front. Although the Mengistu's regime did not openly block all humanitarian aid to the rebel regions, he used that famine as government military policy against the rebellion: aid was delivered through companies closely associated with the Derg and strictly limited by the regime. Due to organized government policies that deliberately multiplied the effects of the famine, around 1.2 million people died in Ethiopia from the famine where the majority of the death tolls were from the present day Tigray Region and Amhara Region and other parts of northern Ethiopia.

==== Aid and controversy ====
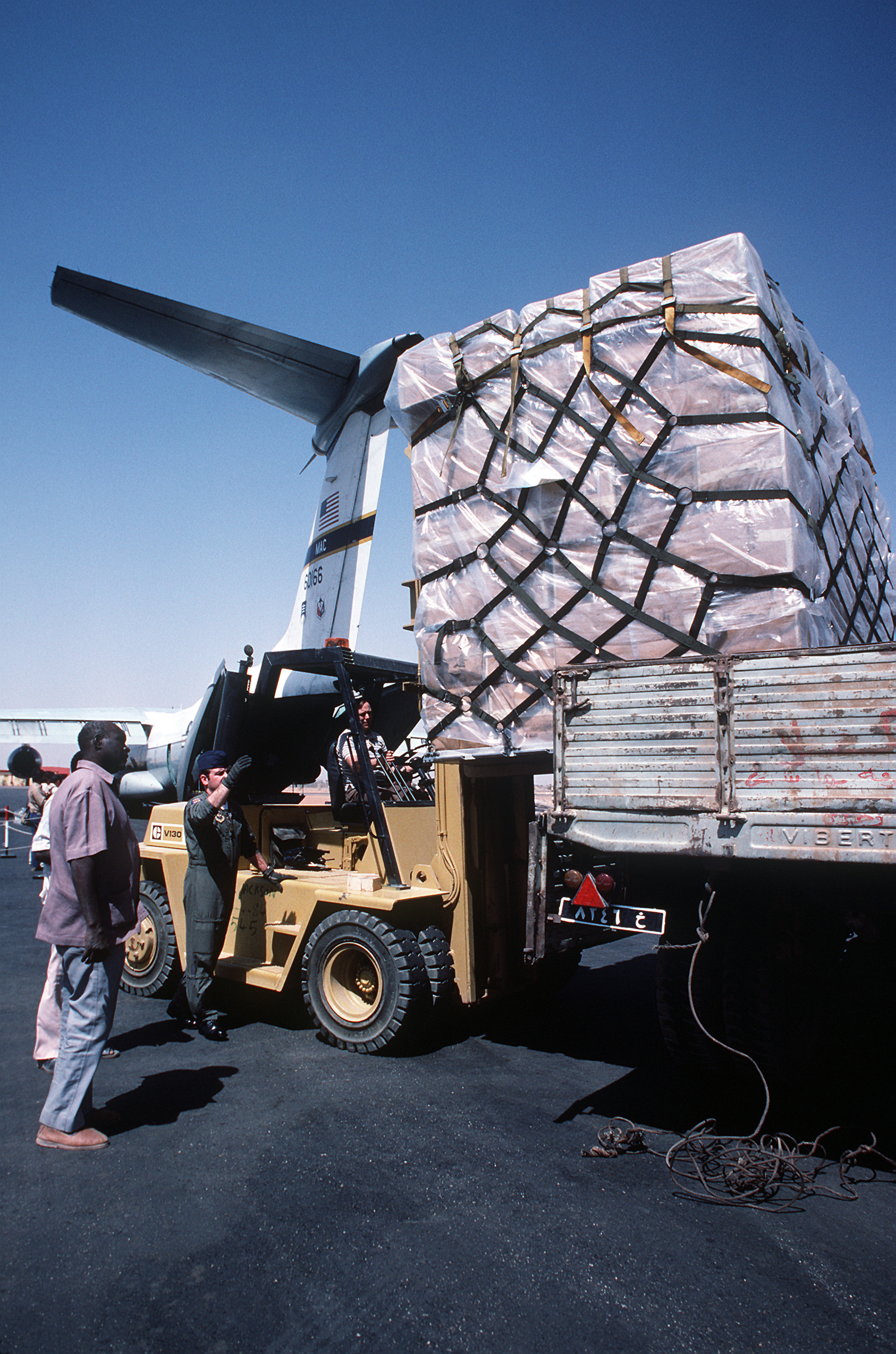
An airlift supplying water truck during the famine in 1985

The 1984–1985 Tigray famine brought the political situation in Ethiopia to the attention of the world and inspired charitable drives in Western nations, notably by Oxfam and the Live Aid concerts of July 1985. The money they raised was distributed among NGOs working in Ethiopia. A controversy arose when it was found that some of these NGOs were under Derg control or influence and that some Oxfam and Live Aid money had been used to fund the Derg's enforced resettlement programmes, under which they displaced millions of people and killed between 50,000 and 100,000. A BBC investigation reported that Tigray People's Liberation Front rebels had used millions of dollars of aid money to buy arms; these accusations were later fully retracted by the corporation.

==== Dissolution and trials ====
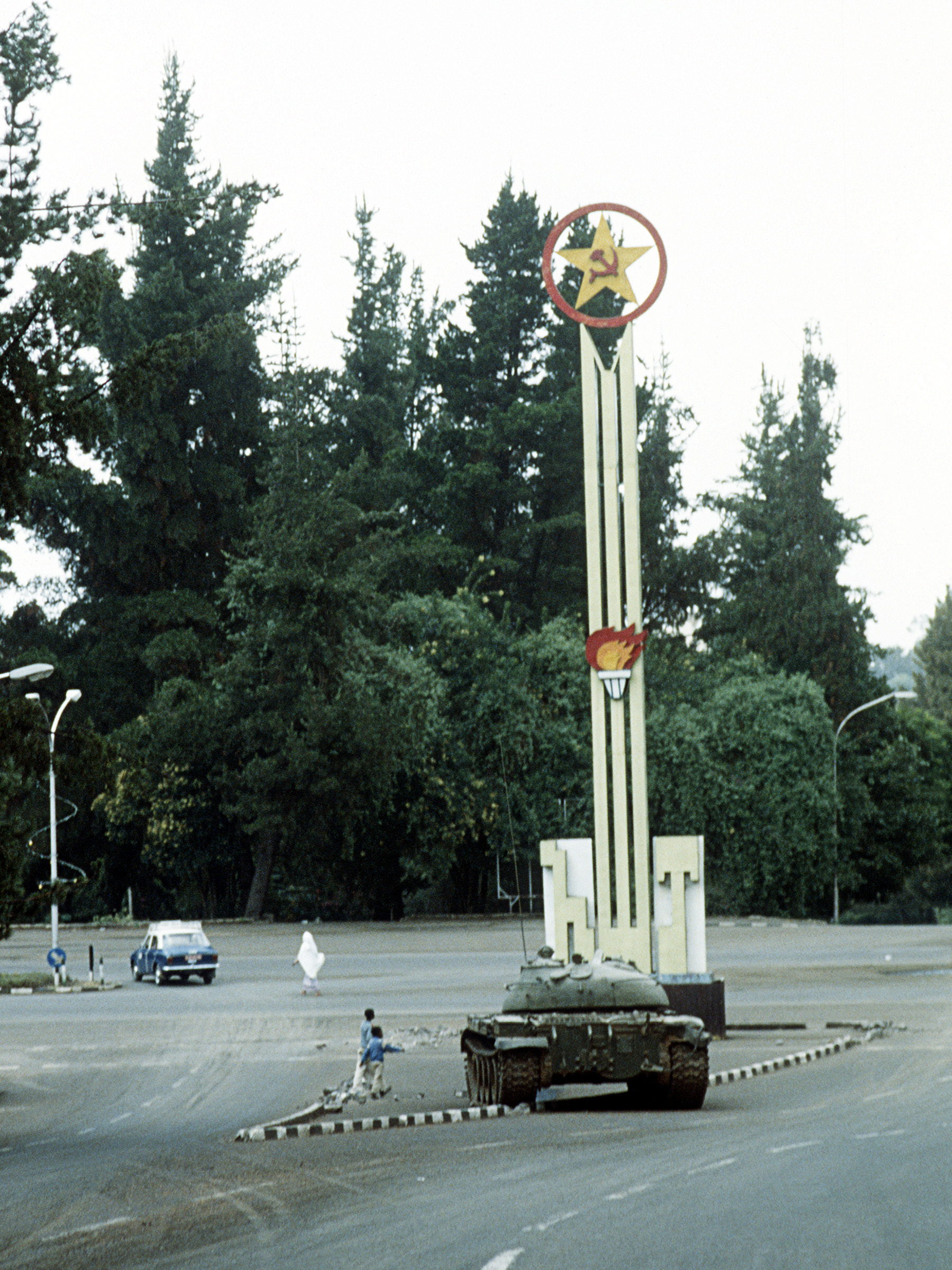
T-55 tanks in the streets of Addis Ababa after rebels seized the capital

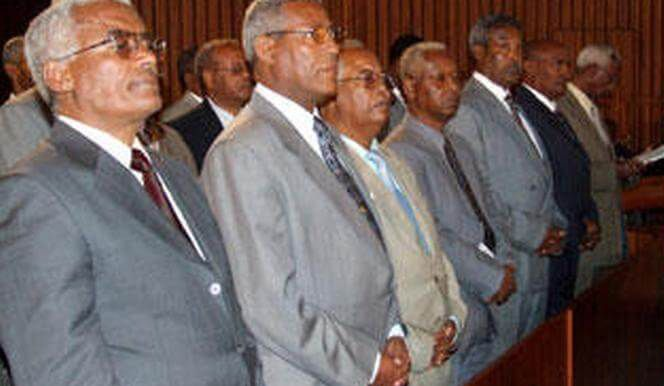
Derg members in court in Addis Ababa, 1994

Although the Derg government came to an end on 22 February 1987, three weeks after a referendum approved the constitution for the PDRE, it was not until September that the new government was fully in place and the Derg formally abolished. The surviving members of the Derg, including Mengistu, remained in power as the leaders of the new civilian regime.

The geopolitical situation became unfavourable for the communist government in the late 1980s, with the Soviet Union retreating from the expansion of Communism under Mikhail Gorbachev's glasnost and perestroika. Socialist bloc countries drastically reduced their aid to Ethiopia and were struggling to keep their own economies going. This resulted in even more economic hardship, and the military gave way in the face of determined onslaughts by guerrilla forces in the north. The Soviet Union stopped aiding the PDRE altogether in December 1990. Together with the fall of Communism in the Eastern Bloc in the Revolutions of 1989, this itself dealt a serious blow to the PDRE.

Towards the end of January 1991, a coalition of rebel forces, the Ethiopian People's Revolutionary Democratic Front (EPRDF) captured Gondar (the ancient capital city), Bahir Dar and Dessie. Meanwhile, the Eritrean People's Liberation Front had gained control of all of Eritrea except for Asmara and Assab in the south. The Soviet Union, mired in its internal turmoil, could no longer prop up the Derg. In the words of the former US diplomat Paul B. Henze, "As his doom became imminent, Mengistu alternated between vowing resistance to the end and hinting that he might follow Emperor Tewodros II's example and commit suicide." His actions were frantic: he convened the Shengo, for an emergency session and reorganized his cabinet, but as Henze concludes, "these shifts came too late to be effective." On 21 May, claiming that he was going to inspect troops at a base in southern Ethiopia, Mengistu slipped out of the country into Kenya. From there, he flew along with his immediate family to Zimbabwe, where he was granted asylum and where he still resides.

Mengistu was sentenced to death in 2008 in absentia, charged with genocide, homicide, illegal imprisonment and property seizures. In 2009, Zimbabwe's late former Information Minister, Tichaona Jokonya, in an interview with Voice of America said Harare was not going to extradite Mengistu. In August 2018, Ethiopian former Prime Minister Hailemariam Desalegn while heading an African Union election observer mission in Harare met with Mengistu, and shared their photo on Facebook, which was quickly deleted as it proved so controversial and generally unpopular. It is thought that Prime Minister Abiy Ahmed, who had at that time released thousands of political prisoners, had approved the visit possibly because some opposition groups had used Mengistu's image to voice their disapproval of Abiy's policies. In May 2022, Zimbabwe's Foreign Affairs Minister Ambassador Frederick Shava gave a clear sign that Harare would be prepared to extradite Mengistu in a reversal of Jokonya's policy. Given the turmoil in Ethiopia with the Tigray conflict, there have been no further apparent developments.

Upon entering Addis Ababa, the EPRDF immediately disbanded the WPE and arrested almost all of the prominent Derg officials shortly after. In December 2006, seventy-three officials of the Derg were found guilty of genocide. Thirty-four people were in court, fourteen others had died during the lengthy process, and twenty-five, including Mengistu, were tried in absentia. The trial ended 26 May 2008, and many of the officials were sentenced to death. In December 2010, the Ethiopian government commuted the death sentence of 23 Derg officials. On 4 October 2011, sixteen former Derg officials were freed after twenty years of incarceration. The Ethiopian government paroled almost all of the Derg officials who had been imprisoned for 20 years. Other Derg ex-officials managed to escape and organized rebel groups to overthrow Ethiopia's new government. One of these groups is the Ethiopian Unity Patriots Front which waged an insurgency in the Gambela Region from 1993 to 2012.

At the conclusion of a trial lasting from 1994 to 2006, Mengistu was convicted of genocide, war crimes and crimes against humanity and sentenced in absentia to death by an Ethiopian court for his role in Ethiopia's Red Terror. The Ethiopian legal definition is distinct from the legal definition as outlined in the Genocide Convention by the United Nations and other definitions in that it defines genocide as intent to wipe out political and not just ethnic groups. In this respect, it closely resembles the definition of politicide outlined by Barbara Harff, who wrote in 1992 that no Communist country or governing body had been convicted of genocide.

== Military ==
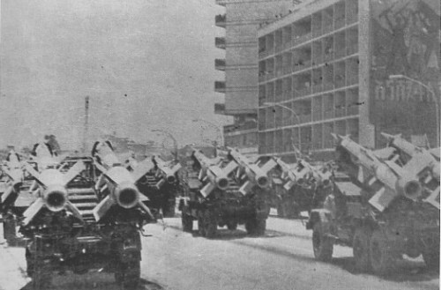
Military parade, circa 1978

The Derg army had significant role in the government and enforcing law since the establishment. By 1976, the Soviet and Derg relations strengthened with the Soviet aided the Derg military with arms. Together with the Cuban soldiers, the military gained support against Somali Democratic Republic during the Ogaden War. According to the United States State Department report in May 1977, 50 Cuban advisors trained Ethiopian troops to combat, while another report in July stated that 3,000 Cubans were in Ethiopia with one Eritrean Liberation Front officer there.

Under the Derg, the Ethiopian military was dominated by the Amhara ethnic group. Similar to the period of the Ethiopian Empire under Menelik II and Haile Selassie, over 80% of generals and over 65% of colonels in the armed forces were Amhara's. While the Amhara constituted the majority of the officer corps, the army was still ethnically heterogeneous.

By 1980, the Derg was estimated to have an excess of 250,000 troops. This was estimated to have cost between 50 and 70 percent of the Ethiopian national budget since 1978. After the regimes fall in 1991, the army of the Derg were only 45,000 troops which disintegrated shortly afterwards.

== Organization ==
=== Chairmen ===
- Aman Mikael Andom (15 September 1974 – 17 November 1974)
- Mengistu Haile Mariam (17 November 1974 – 28 November 1974) (1st term)
- Tafari Benti (28 November 1974 – 3 February 1977)
- Mengistu Haile Mariam (3 February 1977 – 10 September 1987) (2nd term, acting to 11 February 1977)

=== PMAC Standing Committee (January 1985) ===
Chairman
Mengistu Haile Mariam
Secretary-General
Lt.-Col. Fikre Selassie Wogderess
Deputy Secretary-General
Col Fisseha Desta
Military Affairs
Lt.-Gen. Tesfaye Gebre Kidan
Security
Tekla Tulu
Development and Planning
Addis Tedla
Party Organization
Legesse Asfaw
Administrative and Legal Affairs
Wubshet Dessie
Other members
Genesse Wolde-Kidan
Endale Tessema
Kassahun Tafesse
Birhanu Bayeh

== See also ==
- History of Ethiopia
- 1983–1985 famine in Ethiopia
- Marxism–Leninism
- Stalinism
- Vice President of Ethiopia

== Sources ==
- Bahru Zewde. 2001. A History of Modern Ethiopia (second edition). London: James Currey.
- Tareke, Gebru (2009). The Ethiopian Revolution: War in the Horn of Africa. Yale University Press. ISBN 9780300156157.
- Henze, Paul. 2000. Layers of Time: A History of Ethiopia. New York: Palgrave. ISBN 0-312-22719-1
- Ottway, Marina & David. 1978. Ethiopia: Empire in Revolution. New York: Africana
- de Waal, Alex (1991). Evil Days: Thirty Years of War and Famine in Ethiopia. New York & London: Human Rights Watch. ISBN 1-56432-038-3.
- de Waal, Alex (2002) [1997]. Famine Crimes: Politics & the Disaster Relief Industry in Africa. Oxford: James Currey. ISBN 0-85255-810-4.
- Gagnon, Georgette; Clough, Michael; Ross, James, eds. (March 2005). "Targeting the Anuak: Human Rights Violations and Crimes Against Humanity in Ethiopia's Gambella Region" (PDF). Human Rights Watch. 17 (3 (A)).
- Ofcansky, Thomas P; Berry, LaVerle (1993). Ethiopia: A Country Study. Library of Congress Country Studies (4th ed.). Washington, DC: Federal Research Division, Library of Congress. ISBN 0-8444-0739-9.
- Young, John (2006) [1997]. Peasant Revolution in Ethiopia: The Tigray People's Liberation Front, 1975–1991. Cambridge: University Press. ISBN 978-0-521-02606-2.
