= Vice President of Ethiopia =

The vice president of Ethiopia was a political position in Ethiopia during the era of the People's Democratic Republic of Ethiopia. The constitution that established the presidency and vice presidency took effect on 10 September 1987. Both the President and Vice President were indirectly elected by the legislature. The position became obsolete with the adoption of the 1995 constitution.

== List of officeholders ==
=== Derg (1974–1987) ===
Position	Portrait	Name	Took office	Left office	Chairman	Notes
Vice chairman		Lt.-Col Mengistu Haile Mariam	March 1975	February 1977	Tafari Benti	
Second vice chairman		Lt.-Col Atnafu Abate	March 1975	February 1977	Tafari Benti	
Vice chairman		Lt.-Col Atnafu Abate	February 1977	November 1977	Mengistu Haile Mariam	

=== People's Democratic Republic of Ethiopia (1987–1991) ===
Position	Portrait	Name	Took office	Left office	President	Notes
Vice President		Col. Fisseha Desta	September 1987	April 1991	Mengistu Haile Mariam	
Vice President		Lt.-Gen. Tesfaye Gebre Kidan	April 1991	May 1991	Mengistu Haile Mariam	
