= Chief executive (disambiguation) =

Chief executive is another term for a chief executive officer, the highest-ranking corporate officer of an organization.

Chief executive may also refer to:

- Chief executive (head of government), a term for a head of government that allows its holder to perform various functions
  - Chief Executive of Hong Kong, the head of the government of Hong Kong
  - Chief Executive of Macau, the head of the government of Macau
  - Chief Executive Officer (Afghanistan), the head of the government of Afghanistan
- Chief Executive (magazine), a business magazine published by Chief Executive Group

== See also ==
- Head of state, the public persona of a sovereign state
- Head of government, the chief officer of the executive branch of a government
- Executive (government), the branch overseeing administration of the state
