= Mengistu Haile Mariam =

Leader of Ethiopia from 1977 to 1991

Lieutenant Colonel Mengistu Haile Mariam
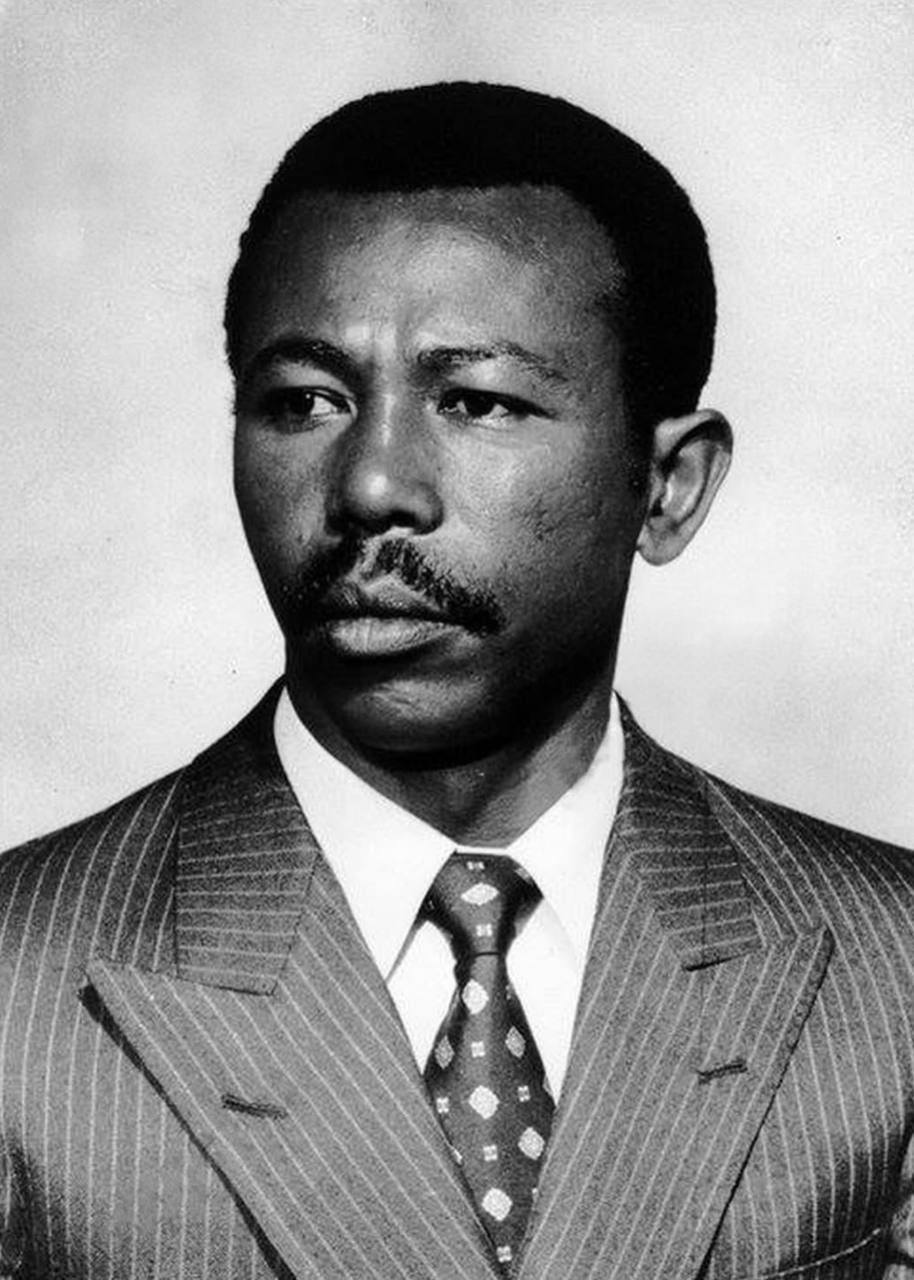
- Official portrait, c. 1977-78

General Secretary of the Workers' Party of Ethiopia
- In office 12 September 1984 – 21 May 1991
- Preceded by: Position established
- Succeeded by: Position abolished

President of Ethiopia
- In office 10 September 1987 – 21 May 1991
- Prime Minister: Fikre Selassie Wogderess; Hailu Yimenu; Tesfaye Dinka
- Vice President: Fisseha Desta (1987–1991); Tesfaye Gebre Kidan (1991)
- Preceded by: Himself as Chairman of the Derg
- Succeeded by: Tesfaye Gebre Kidan (acting)

Chairman of the Derg and head of state of Ethiopia
- In office 3 February 1977 – 10 September 1987
- Deputy: Atnafu Abate
- Preceded by: Tafari Benti
- Succeeded by: Himself as President
- In office 17 November 1974 – 28 November 1974; Acting
- Preceded by: Aman Mikael Andom
- Succeeded by: Tafari Benti

Personal details
- Born: 21 May 1937 (age 89) Walayitta, Galla-Sidamo Governorate, Italian East Africa (now Ethiopia)
- Party: Workers' Party of Ethiopia (1984–1991); COPWE (1979–1984)

Military service
- Allegiance: Ethiopian Empire (1953–1974); Derg (1974–1987); PDR Ethiopia (1987–1991)
- Years of service: 1953–1991
- Battles/wars: Ethiopian Civil War; Eritrean War of Independence; Ogaden War; 1982 Ethiopian–Somali Border War

Mengistu Haile Mariam (/mɛnˈɡɪstuː ˈhaɪleɪ ˈmɑːriːɑːm/; Amharic: መንግሥቱ ኃይለ ማርያም, pronunciation: [mənɡɨstu haɪlə marjam]; born 21 May 1937) is an Ethiopian former military officer and communist politician who was the leader of Ethiopia from 1977 to 1991. He was General Secretary of the Workers' Party of Ethiopia from 1984 to 1991, chairman of the Derg—the Marxist–Leninist military junta that ruled Ethiopia—from 1977 to 1987, and president of the People's Democratic Republic of Ethiopia (PDRE) from 1987 to 1991.

The Derg seized power in the Ethiopian Revolution following the overthrow of Emperor Haile Selassie in 1974, marking the end of the Solomonic dynasty which had ruled Ethiopia since the 13th century. Mengistu purged his rivals within the Derg and made himself leader of Ethiopia, attempting to modernize the country's feudal economy through Marxist–Leninist–inspired policies such as nationalization and land redistribution. His consolidation of power in 1977–1978 is known as the Ethiopian Red Terror—a brutal crackdown on opposition groups and civilians following a failed assassination attempt by the Ethiopian People's Revolutionary Party (EPRP) in September 1976, after it had ignored the Derg's invitation to join the union of socialist parties. The death toll is unknown but is estimated at between 30,000 and 750,000 by the Ethiopian Red Terror Documentation and Research Center.

Internal rebellion, government repression, and economic mismanagement characterized Mengistu's presidency, the Red Terror period being a battle for dominance between the Derg, the EPRP, and their rival the All-Ethiopia Socialist Movement (MEISON), which had initially aligned itself with the Derg. While this internal conflict was being fought, Ethiopia was threatened by both the Somali invasion and the guerrilla campaign of the Eritrean People's Liberation Front, who demanded independence for Eritrea, then a province of Ethiopia. The Ogaden War of 1977–1978 with Somalia, fought over a disputed border region (Ogaden), was notable for the prominent role of Mengistu's Soviet and Cuban allies in securing an Ethiopian victory. The catastrophic famine of 1983–1985 is what brought his government the most international attention.

Mengistu fled to Zimbabwe in May 1991 after the PDRE National Shengo dissolved itself and called for a transitional government. His departure brought an abrupt end to the Ethiopian Civil War. Mengistu Haile Mariam still lives in Harare, Zimbabwe, despite an Ethiopian court verdict which found him guilty of genocide in absentia. Mengistu's government is estimated to be responsible for the deaths of 500,000 to 2,000,000 Ethiopians, mostly during the 1983–1985 famine in Ethiopia.

== Early life ==
Mengistu Haile Mariam was born on 21 May 1937 in Walayitta, Kaffa Province, during the Italian occupation of Ethiopia. Accounts of his family background differ, including claims that his family was of slave origin and came from southern Ethiopia. (Note: The ethnic identities of Mengistu's parents are disputed. Biographical accounts have variously identified them as Oromo, Konso, or Wolayta.)

After the Italians were defeated and expelled from the country in 1941, with the East African campaign of World War II, his parents moved to Debre Markos. His father, Haile Mariam, subsequently joined the imperial army of Haile Selassie and attained the rank of corporal. He was later transferred to Addis Ababa, where he worked in the army's ammunition production unit. Mengistu grew up partly in the household of Dejazmach Kebede Tesema, a former governor of Gojjam. His father reportedly served as a guard in Kebede's household, while his mother is said to have worked as a domestic servant. Mengistu spent part of his childhood in military camps across the country and part in the compound of the aristocratic household.

In Debre Markos, Mengistu attended Negus Tekle Haimanot School. Accounts of his school years describe him as a troublesome student who showed little interest in his studies. He was eventually expelled from secondary school for misconduct and subsequently entered the army at a young age.

== Army life ==
As a young soldier, Mengistu attracted the attention of General Aman Andom, an Eritrean-born officer who promoted him to sergeant and assigned him clerical and messenger duties in his office. Aman recommended him for admission to the Holetta Military Academy, one of Ethiopia's principal military training institutions. After graduating in 1957, Mengistu was commissioned as a second lieutenant. Aman subsequently became his mentor and, when appointed commander of the army's Third Division, brought Mengistu with him to Harar.

In Harar, Mengistu served as an ordnance officer in the Third Division. In 1964, he travelled to the United States for training at the Savanna Army Depot in Illinois, where he attended a six-month course in ordnance testing.

Aman was later transferred to Addis Ababa and removed from his operational military duties. His growing popularity among soldiers, reinforced by his performance at Tog Wuchale during the 1964 Ethiopian–Somali Border War, reportedly contributed to the imperial government's concerns about his influence within the army. Prime Minister Aklilu Habte-Wold reassigned him to a civilian position as a senator. According to a later account, Aman disliked the appointment but feared that refusing it would incur the displeasure of Emperor Haile Selassie.

Aman was succeeded as Third Division commander by General Haile Baikedagn, who reportedly regarded Mengistu as an insubordinate and potentially dangerous officer. According to accounts of their relationship, Haile submitted a confidential report recommending that Mengistu be closely monitored and denied further promotion. Mengistu resisted the general's emphasis on strict discipline and military order, leading to further tensions between the two officers.

Despite these disagreements, Mengistu was subsequently sent to the United States for further military training. He attended an 18-month programme at Aberdeen Proving Ground in Maryland, where he also took evening classes at the University of Maryland. During this period, he developed his English-language skills. In 1970, he returned to the United States for further studies at the Combined Arms Center at Fort Leavenworth, Kansas.

After returning to Ethiopia, Mengistu was expected to assume command of an ordnance sub-division in Harar, but Haile Baikedagn reportedly blocked the appointment because of their earlier disagreements. In November 1974, Haile was executed alongside dozens of senior officials and military officers during the early consolidation of power by the Derg, the military committee that had overthrown Haile Selassie. Mengistu subsequently emerged as the Derg's dominant figure.

Accounts of Mengistu's early military career have also addressed his experiences of ethnic and racial prejudice. Historian Paul B. Henze notes that Mengistu believed he had encountered racial discrimination during his military training in the United States, although Henze found no evidence independently confirming those allegations. Henze also discusses the possibility that such experiences contributed to Mengistu's attitudes towards the United States and his perception of his own social position.

When Mengistu took power, and attended the meeting of Derg members at the Fourth Division headquarters in Addis Ababa, he exclaimed with emotion:

In this country, some aristocratic families automatically categorize persons with dark skin, thick lips, and kinky hair as "Barias" (Amharic for slave)... let it be clear to everybody that I shall soon make these ignoramuses stoop and grind corn!

Historian Bahru Zewde describes Mengistu as having a particular ability to assess situations and individuals. While some observers interpreted this ability as evidence of intelligence, Bahru argues that it was better understood as a form of practical, situational awareness, which he relates to the Ethiopian term aradanat.

== Rise of the Derg ==
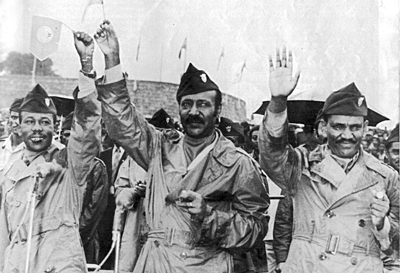
Mengistu Haile Mariam (left) with fellow Derg members Tafari Benti (middle) and Atnafu Abate (right) c. 1975

Emperor Haile Selassie's government, having lost the confidence of the Ethiopian public following a drought and crop failures in Wollo province, was overthrown in the Ethiopian Revolution of 1974. As a result, power came into the hands of a committee of low-ranking officers and enlisted soldiers led by Atnafu Abate, which came to be known as the Derg. Mengistu was originally one of the lesser members, officially sent to represent the Third Division because his commander, General Nega Tegnegn, considered him a trouble-maker and wanted to get rid of him. Between July and September 1974 through sheer demagoguery and political intrigues, Mengistu succeeded to outmaneuver all officers who stood in his way and climbed the political ladder. Mengistu and Atnafu Abate were the deputy chairmen of Derg from March 1975 to February 1977.

Haile Selassie died in 1975. It is rumored that Mengistu smothered the Emperor using a pillowcase, but Mengistu has denied these rumors. Though several groups were involved in the overthrow, the Derg succeeded to power. There is no doubt that the Derg under Mengistu's leadership ordered the execution without trial of 61 ex-officials of the Imperial government on 23 November 1974, and later of numerous other former nobles and officials including the Patriarch of the Ethiopian Orthodox Church, Abuna Theophilos, in 1977. Mengistu himself has acknowledged that the Derg ordered these deaths but refuses to accept personal responsibility. Members of the Derg have contradicted him in interviews given from prison, saying he conspired and was in full agreement with their decisions.

== Leadership of Ethiopia ==
Mengistu did not emerge as the leader of the Derg until after the 3 February 1977 shootout, in which Chairman Tafari Benti was killed. The vice-chairman of the Derg, Atnafu Abate, clashed with Mengistu over the issue of how to handle the war in Eritrea and lost, leading to his execution with 40 other officers, clearing the way for Mengistu to assume control. He formally assumed power as head of state, and justified his execution of Abate (on 13 November of that year) by claiming that he had "placed the interests of Ethiopia above the interests of socialism" and undertaken other "counter-revolutionary" activities.

=== Political conflicts ===
Resistance against the Derg ensued, led primarily by the Ethiopian People's Revolutionary Party (EPRP). Mengistu cracked down on the EPRP and other revolutionary student organizations in what would become called the "Red Terror". The Derg subsequently turned against the socialist student movement MEISON, a major supporter against the EPRP, in what would be called the "White Terror".

The EPRP's efforts to discredit and undermine the Derg and its MEISON collaborators escalated in the fall of 1976. It targeted public buildings and other symbols of state authority for bombings and assassinated numerous Abyot Seded and MEISON members, as well as public officials at all levels. Four members of the EPRP were executed after being charged with the 23 September assassination attempt on Mengistu and the assassination of a civilian official. The Derg, which countered with its own counter-terrorism campaign, labeled the EPRP's tactics the White Terror. Mengistu asserted that all "progressives" were given "freedom of action" in helping root out the revolution's enemies, and his wrath was particularly directed toward the EPRP. Peasants, workers, public officials, and even students thought to be loyal to the Mengistu regime were provided with arms to accomplish this task.

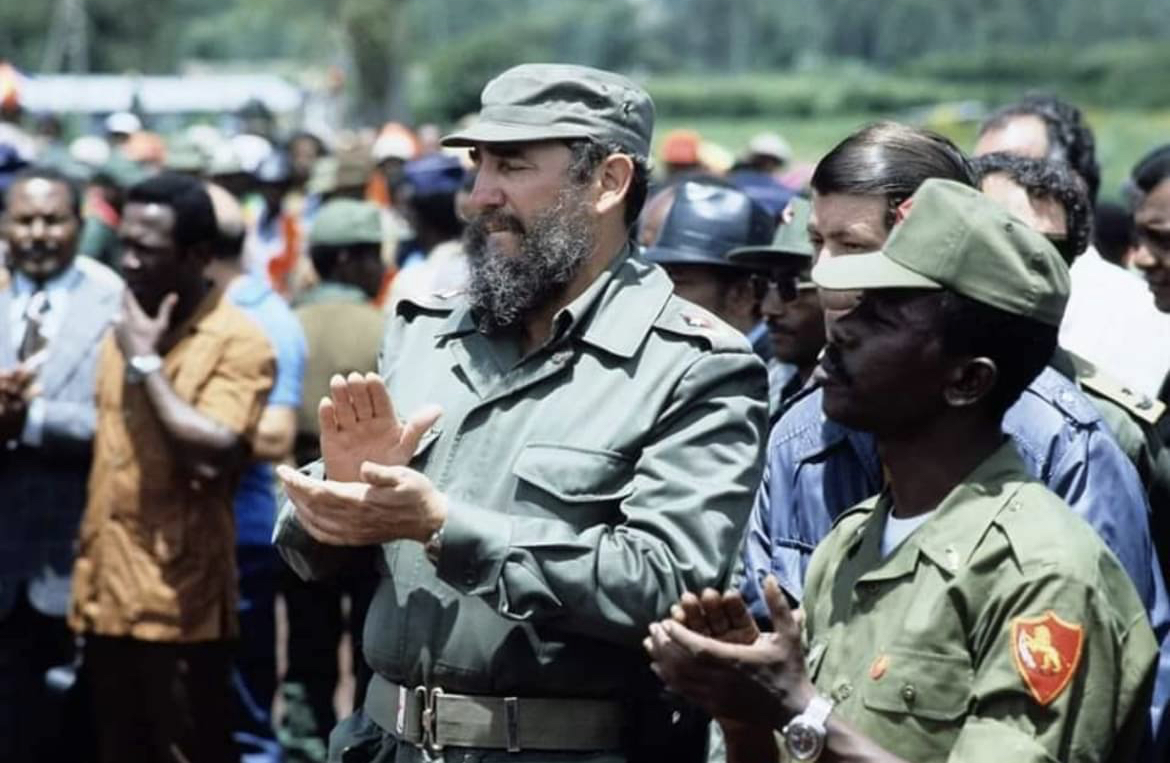
Fidel Castro meets with Mengistu Haile Mariam in Ethiopia, 1977

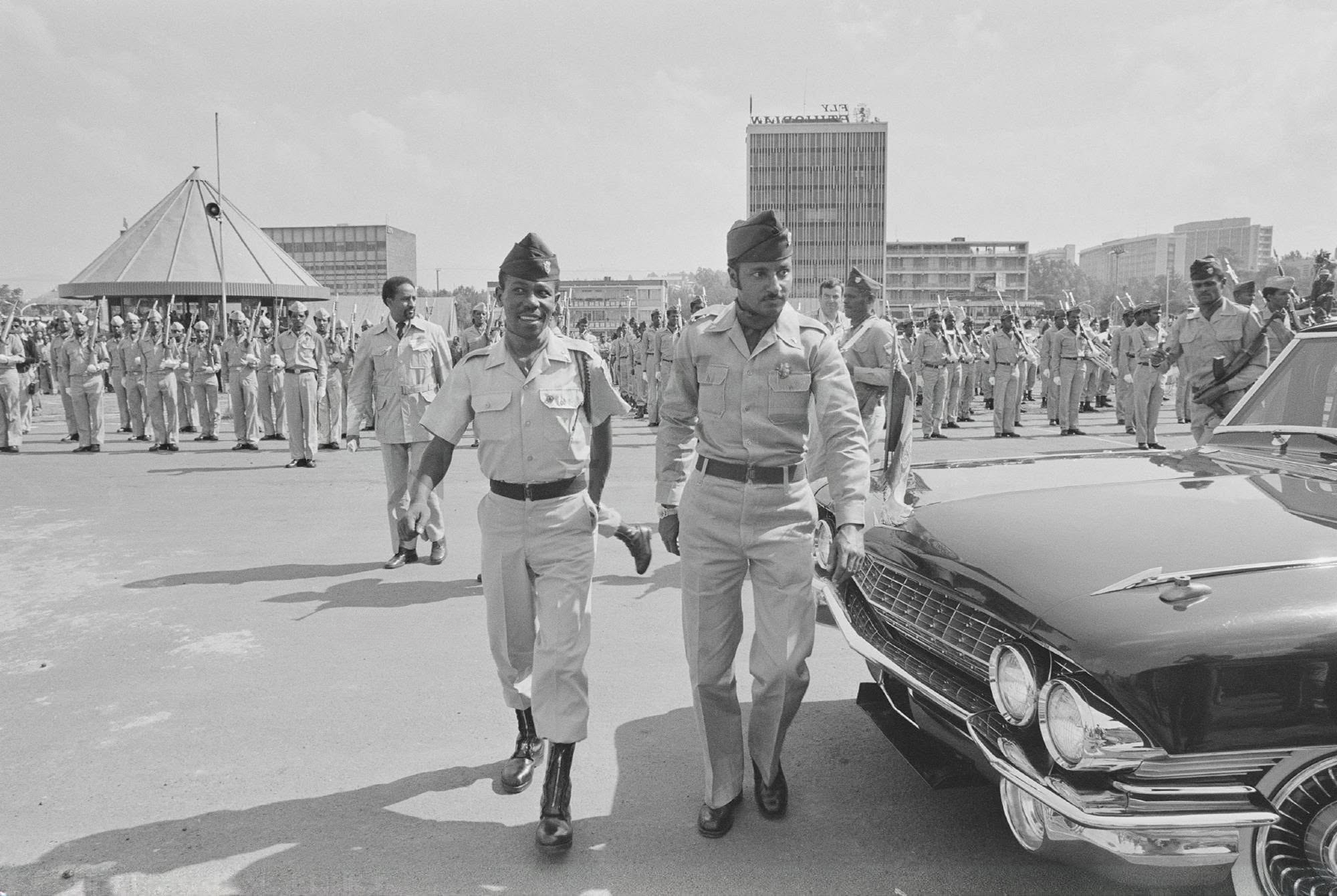
Lieutenant Colonel Mengistu Haile Mariam at a Mayday Rally May 1, 1977

In a public speech in April 1977, Mengistu shouted "Death to counterrevolutionaries! Death to the EPRP!" and then produced three bottles filled with a red liquid that symbolized the blood of the imperialists and the counterrevolutionaries and smashed them to the ground to show what the revolution would do to its enemies. Thousands of young men and women turned up dead in the streets of the capital and other cities in the following months. They were systematically murdered mainly by the militia attached to the kebeles, the neighborhood watch committees which served during Mengistu's reign as the lowest level local government and security surveillance units. Families had to pay the kebeles a tax known as "the wasted bullet" to obtain the bodies of their loved ones. In May 1977, the Swedish general secretary of the Save the Children Fund stated that "1,000 children have been killed, and their bodies are left in the streets and are being eaten by wild hyenas. You can see the heaped-up bodies of murdered children, most of them aged eleven to thirteen, lying in the gutter, as you drive out of Addis Ababa." Amnesty International estimates that up to 500,000 people were killed during the Ethiopian Red Terror.

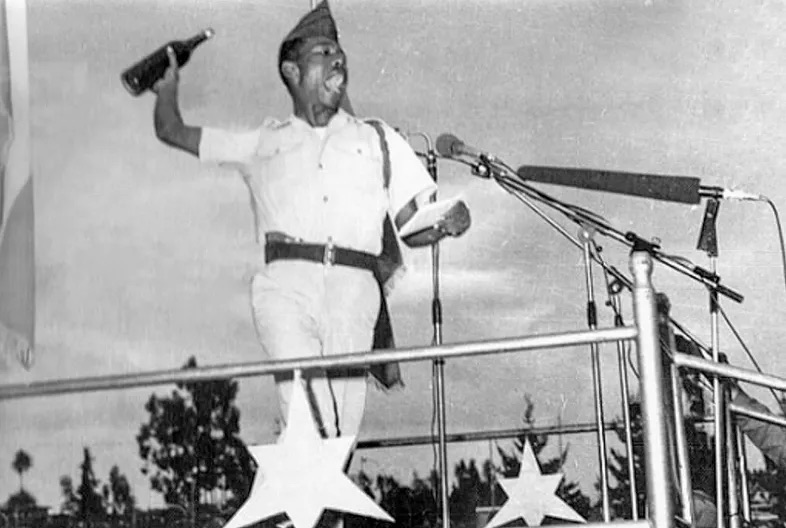
Same Mengistu's speech. Moment during which he is throwing a bottle filled with blood.

Military gains made by the monarchist Ethiopian Democratic Union in Begemder were rolled back when that party split just as it was on the verge of capturing the old capital of Gondar. The army of the Somali Democratic Republic invaded Ethiopia, having overrun the Ogaden region, and was on the verge of capturing Harar and Dire Dawa, when Somalia's erstwhile allies, the Soviets and the Cubans, launched an unprecedented arms and personnel airlift to support Ethiopia. The Derg government turned back the Somali invasion and made deep strides against the Eritrean secessionists and the Tigray People's Liberation Front (TPLF) as well. By the end of the seventies, Mengistu presided over the second-largest army in all of sub-Saharan Africa, as well as a formidable air force and navy.

=== Embracing Marxism–Leninism ===
After coming to power, Mengistu embraced the philosophy of Marxism–Leninism, which was increasingly popular among many nationalists and revolutionaries throughout Africa and much of the Third World at the time. In the mid-1970s, under Mengistu's leadership, the Derg regime radicalized and began an aggressive program of changing system of Ethiopia from a mixed feudal-capitalist emergent economy to an Eastern Bloc-style command economy. All rural land was nationalized, stripping the Ethiopian Church, the Imperial family, and the nobility of all their sizable estates and the bulk of their wealth. During this same period, all foreign-owned and locally owned companies were nationalized without compensation in an effort to redistribute the country's wealth. All undeveloped urban property and all rental property were also nationalized. Private businesses such as banks and insurance companies, large retail businesses, etc. were also taken over by the government. All this nationalized property was brought under the administration of large bureaucracies set up to administer them. Farmers who had once worked on land owned by absentee landlords were now compelled to join collective farms. All agricultural products were no longer to be offered on the free market but were to be controlled and distributed by the government. Despite progressive agricultural reforms, under the Derg, agricultural output suffered due to civil war, drought and misguided economic policies. There was also a famine in 1984, which was the 10th anniversary of the Derg.

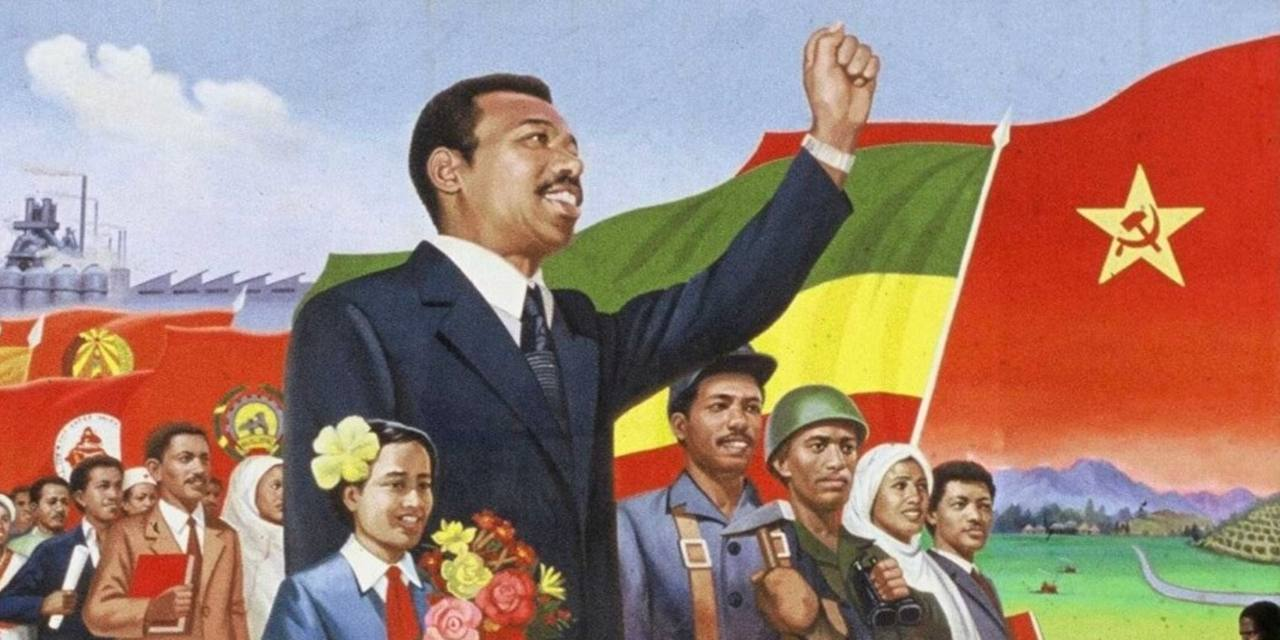
Propaganda poster, shows Mengistu.

The Soviets hailed Ethiopia for its supposed similar cultural and historical parallels to the USSR. Moscow said it proved that a backward society could become revolutionary by adopting a Leninist system. It was hailed as a model junior ally that Moscow was eager to support. In the 1980s Ethiopia plunged into greater turmoil and the Soviet system itself was collapsing by 1990. Russian commentators had turned scornful of the Ethiopian regime.

In early 1984, under Mengistu's direction, the Marxist–Leninist Workers' Party of Ethiopia (WPE) was founded as the country's ruling party, with Mengistu as general secretary. On 10 September 1987, a new Soviet-style constitution was adopted, and the country was renamed the People's Democratic Republic of Ethiopia. Mengistu became president, with sweeping executive and legislative powers. Due to the doctrine of democratic centralism, he was effectively a dictator. He and the other surviving members of the Derg all retired from the military. However, even as civilians, they dominated the Politburo of the WPE. In the late 1980s, some Western critics of Mengistu, including Michael Johns of The Heritage Foundation, charged that Mengistu's economic, military and political policies, along with the Soviet Union's support for Mengistu, were key contributing factors to the mid-1980s Ethiopian famine, which ultimately took over 500,000 lives. Mengistu made seven visits to the Soviet Union between 1977 and 1984, as well as other visits to his political allies Cuba, East Germany, South Yemen, and Mozambique. From 1983 to 1984 Mengistu served as head of the Organization of African Unity.

However, the government's military position gradually weakened. First came the Battle of Afabet in March 1988, a defeat at the hands of the Eritrean People's Liberation Front, with 15,000 casualties and the loss of a great deal of equipment. This was followed up less than a year later by another crushing defeat at Shire, with over 20,000 men either killed or captured and the loss of even more equipment. On 16 May 1989, while Mengistu was out of the country for a four-day state visit to East Germany, senior military officials attempted a coup, and the Minister of Defense, Haile Giyorgis Habte Mariam, was killed; Mengistu returned within 24 hours and nine generals, including the air force commander and the army chief of staff, died as the coup was crushed.

== Removal from power; asylum in Zimbabwe ==
By 1990, the Soviet Union had all but ended its support for Mengistu's regime. In a failed attempt to buy more time, Mengistu renounced communism in 1990 and his regime began taking steps toward opening the economy. However, the liberalization of Ethiopia's economy lasted only one year under DPRE. Meanwhile, the Ethiopian People's Revolutionary Democratic Front (EPRDF) gradually tightened the noose around the capital. The following year, Mengistu ordered the closure of all educational institutions and the mobilization of all students for a war "to save the nation." On 19 April 1991, Mengistu addressed the nation in a televised address, in which he declared:

I do not think that our country has ever been faced with such a problem as the one we now face. Although many are the times that traitors have come up against their country's and the people's weakness and brought about destruction, it was for the supremacy of one over the other, to gain authority.

Following the televised address, Mengistu held an emergency meeting of his cabinet, during which he announced the mobilization of party resources, as well as all men aged 18 and over. In recent weeks, the president had attempted to engage with the rebels, but to no avail. In May 1991, the EPRDF forces advanced on Addis Ababa from all sides, and Mengistu fled the country with 50 family and Derg members by Ethiopian air force jet to Nairobi, Kenya. He was granted asylum in Zimbabwe as an official guest of Zimbabwean President Robert Mugabe. Mengistu settled in farm house located in Norton, which is about 30 miles southwest of Zimbabwe's capital city Harare. Mengistu's wife Web-anchi Beshaw, had already arrived in Zimbabwe two months before her husbands's departure.

Mengistu left behind almost the entire membership of the original Derg and the WPE leadership. The regime only survived without him for another week before the EPRDF streamed into the capital, precluding the previous leadership's escape. Almost all were promptly arrested and put on trial upon the assumption of power by the EPRDF. Mengistu has claimed that the takeover of his country resulted from the policies of Mikhail Gorbachev, who in his view allowed the dissolution of the Soviet Union and the termination of its aid to Ethiopia.

An assassination attempt against Mengistu occurred on 4 November 1995, while he was out walking with his wife, Wubanchi Bishaw, near his home in the Gunhill suburb of Harare. While Mengistu was unharmed, his alleged attacker, Solomon Haile Ghebre Michael, an Eritrean, was shot and arrested by Mengistu's bodyguards. He was later tried for this assassination attempt, pleading not guilty in a Zimbabwean court on 8 July 1996. The Eritrean Ambassador to South Africa, Tsegaye Tesfa Tsion, flew to Harare to attend the trial. The attacker was sentenced to ten years in prison, while his accomplice Abraham Goletom Joseph, who had been arrested in a police raid, was sentenced to five years. They said that they had been tortured under Mengistu, and on appeal, their sentences were reduced to two years each due to "mitigatory circumstances". The Ethiopian ambassador to Zimbabwe, Fantahun Haile Michael, said his government was not involved in the assassination attempt, and that he heard about the incident from the media.

Although Mugabe has since been removed from power in 2017, no new extradition requests have been submitted.

As of 2018, Mengistu still resided in Zimbabwe, despite the Ethiopian government's desire that he be extradited. He is said to live in luxurious circumstances, and it is claimed that he advised Mugabe on security matters; according to Zimbabwean intelligence sources, he proposed the idea of clearing slums, which was implemented as Operation Murambatsvina in 2005, and chaired meetings at which the operation was planned. However, the State Security Minister Didymus Mutasa strongly denied that Mengistu was involved in Operation Murambatsvina.

In 2018, the former prime minister of Ethiopia Hailemariam Desalegn published a photo of himself meeting with Mengistu. He withdrew the photo after criticism.

In May 2022, Zimbabwe suggested it might extradite Mengistu to Ethiopia.

== Genocide trial ==
Mengistu was charged by the Ethiopian government led by Meles Zenawi, in absentia, with the killing of nearly 2,000 people. The charge sheet and evidence list for his crimes were 8,000 pages long. The evidence against him included signed execution orders, videos of torture sessions, and personal testimony. The trial began in 1994 and ended in 2006. The court found Mengistu guilty as charged on 12 December 2006, and imposed a life sentence in January 2007. In addition to the genocide conviction, the court found him guilty of imprisonment, illegal homicide, and illegal confiscation of property. Michael Clough, a US attorney and longtime observer of Ethiopia, said in a statement:

The biggest problem with prosecuting Mengistu for genocide is that his actions did not necessarily target a particular group. They were directed against anybody who was opposing his government, and they were generally much more political than based on any ethnic targeting.

Some experts believe hundreds of thousands of university students, intellectuals, and politicians (including Emperor Haile Selassie) were killed during Mengistu's rule. Amnesty International estimates that a total of half a million people were killed during the Red Terror of 1977 and 1978. Human Rights Watch describes the Red Terror as "one of the most systematic uses of mass murder by a state ever witnessed in Africa." During his reign it was not uncommon to see students, suspected government critics, or rebel sympathizers hanging from lampposts each morning. Mengistu himself is alleged to have murdered opponents by garroting or shooting them, saying that he was leading by example. Estimates of the number of deaths for which he was responsible range from 500,000 to over 2,000,000.

106 Derg officials were accused of genocide during the trials, but only 36 of them were present in the court. Several former members of the Derg have been sentenced to death. After Mengistu's conviction in December 2006, the Zimbabwean government said that he still enjoyed asylum and would not be extradited. A Zimbabwean government spokesman explained this by saying that "Mengistu and his government played a key and commendable role during our struggle for independence". According to the spokesman, Mengistu assisted Zimbabwean guerrilla fighters during the Rhodesian Bush War by providing training and arms; after the war, he had provided training for Zimbabwean air force pilots. The spokesman said that "not many countries have shown such commitment to us".

Following an appeal on 26 May 2008, Mengistu was sentenced to death in absentia by Ethiopia's High Court, overturning his previous sentence of life imprisonment. Twenty-three of his most senior aides also received death sentences that were commuted on 1 June 2011. As of 4 October 2011, 16 former Mengistu officials have been released from prison on parole, due to their old age and good behavior while incarcerated. However, Mengistu's sentence remained unchanged.

== Memoirs ==
In 2010, Mengistu announced the publication of his memoirs. In early 2012, a manuscript of the memoir, entitled Tiglatchin ("Our Struggle" in Amharic), was leaked onto the internet. Some months later the first leaked volume was published in the United States, and in 2016 the second volume followed. This time it was published in Ethiopia. Mengistu accused the remnants of the EPRP of leaking the first volume to sabotage his publication.
