= Tesfaye Gebre Kidan =

Ethiopian politician and military officer (1935–2004)

Lieutenant General Tesfaye Gebre Kidan
- ተስፋዬ ገብረ ኪዳን
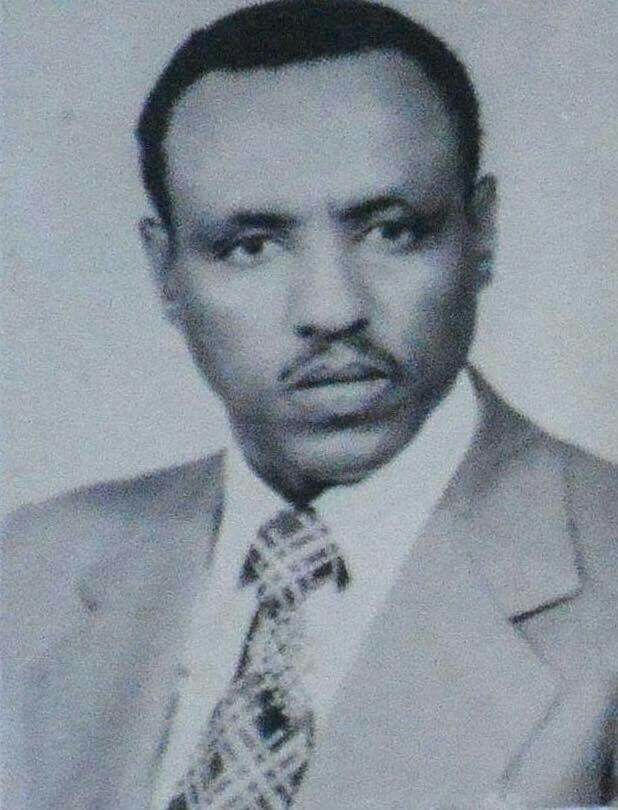
- Tesfaye in 1991

President of Ethiopia
- Acting
- In office 21 May 1991 – 27 May 1991
- Preceded by: Mengistu Haile Mariam
- Succeeded by: Meles Zenawi (Acting)

Vice President of Ethiopia
- In office 26 April 1991 – 21 May 1991
- President: Mengistu Haile Mariam
- Preceded by: Fisseha Desta
- Succeeded by: Post abolished

Governor-General of Eritrea
- In office August 1989 – 29 May 1991
- President: Mengistu Haile Mariam
- Preceded by: Afework Wolemikael
- Succeeded by: Isaias Afwerki as Secretary-General of the Provisional Government of Eritrea

Minister of Defense
- In office January 1980 – 14 May 1988
- President: Mengistu Haile Mariam
- Preceded by: Taye Tilahun
- Succeeded by: Haile Giorgis Habte Mariam

Personal details
- Born: c. 1935 Hararghe, Ethiopian Empire
- Died: 4 June 2004 (aged 68–69) Addis Ababa, Ethiopia
- Party: Workers' Party of Ethiopia

Tesfaye Gebre Kidan Geletu (Amharic: ተስፋዬ ገብረ ኪዳን ገለቱ, romanized: Täsfaye Gäbrä Kidan Gälätu, c. 1935 – 4 June 2004) was an Ethiopian military officer and politician who was the interim president of Ethiopia for one week in late May 1991.

== Biography ==
An ethnic Amhara from the eastern province of Hararghe, Tesfaye took a one year teacher training course to become an elementary school teacher. After completing his training, he was assigned to Gamu-Gofa province. Because of little pay and bad living conditions, he left his teaching job to join the Ethiopian Army and later enrolled at the Holetta Military Academy.

At the academy he met Mengistu Haile Mariam; according to Gebru Tareke, along with Legesse Asfaw and Gebreyes Wolde Hana Tesfaye was part of Mengistu's inner circle, his "pals Mengistu knew more intimately in less pressing times, men who played and drank with him and stood by him during the bloody factional days of the Derg." While a colonel, Tesfaye was a member of the Derg, the military committee which seized power from Emperor Haile Selassie, and which would later order the executions of his officials and allegedly the murder of the deposed emperor himself. He had military successes in Somalia and Eritrea, notably as commander of the forces around Jijiga during the Ogaden War.

Elevated to the rank of Lt. General, Tesfaye Gebre Kidan went on to serve as the longtime minister of defence, then on 14 May 1988 was made military governor and general commander in Eritrea. He was recalled to Addis Ababa from Asmara to serve on the military tribunal, which tried the high-ranking officers who had tried to depose President Mengistu in 1989 following the decisive defeat at the Battle of Shire.

=== Vice President of Ethiopia ===
He was appointed as Vice President of Ethiopia in April 1991. He became acting president on 21 May 1991 when Mengistu fled as Ethiopian People's Revolutionary Democratic Front (EPRDF) forces closed in on the capital.

Tesfaye took over a regime in a state of utter collapse. He only ruled for a week before the EPRDF marched into Addis Ababa and seized power on 27 May 1991. "Government troops turned on one another," read one contemporary account. "Soldiers wantonly looted state property." Tesfaye realized almost as soon as he took power that he was in an untenable position. With the EPRDF closing in on Addis Ababa from all sides, Tesfaye informed the U.S. chargé d'affaires in Addis Ababa that he could no longer control the situation and had lost command of what was left of the army. After announcing a unilateral cease-fire he fled for the safety of the Italian Embassy. According to Paul B. Henze, Tesfaye had first sought sanctuary at the US embassy, but Ambassador Robert Houdek turned him away.

=== Asylum in the Italian Embassy ===
The General remained a virtual prisoner in the embassy. He suffered a stroke while at the embassy, and as a result used a wheelchair to move around.

=== Death ===
Tesfaye's death was publicly confirmed on 4 June 2004.

It is rumored that he died after being hit over the head with a bottle during a physical brawl with Berhanu. In the book I noti ospiti, a waiter claimed that on June 2, 2004, Tesfaye was struck on the head with a bottle by his fellow refugee (and former foreign minister) Berhanu Bayeh, causing him to bleed. He was taken to Menelik II Hospital, where he was pronounced dead. However, CNN later reported that a diplomatic source from the Italian embassy declared that Berhanu was not involved in the death.

== Notes ==
Political offices
Preceded by Mengistu Haile Mariam	President of Ethiopia; 1991	Succeeded by Meles Zenawi
