= Fisseha Desta =

Ethiopian politician and military officer (1941–2022)

Lieutenant Colonel Fisseha Desta
- ፍስሃ ደስታ
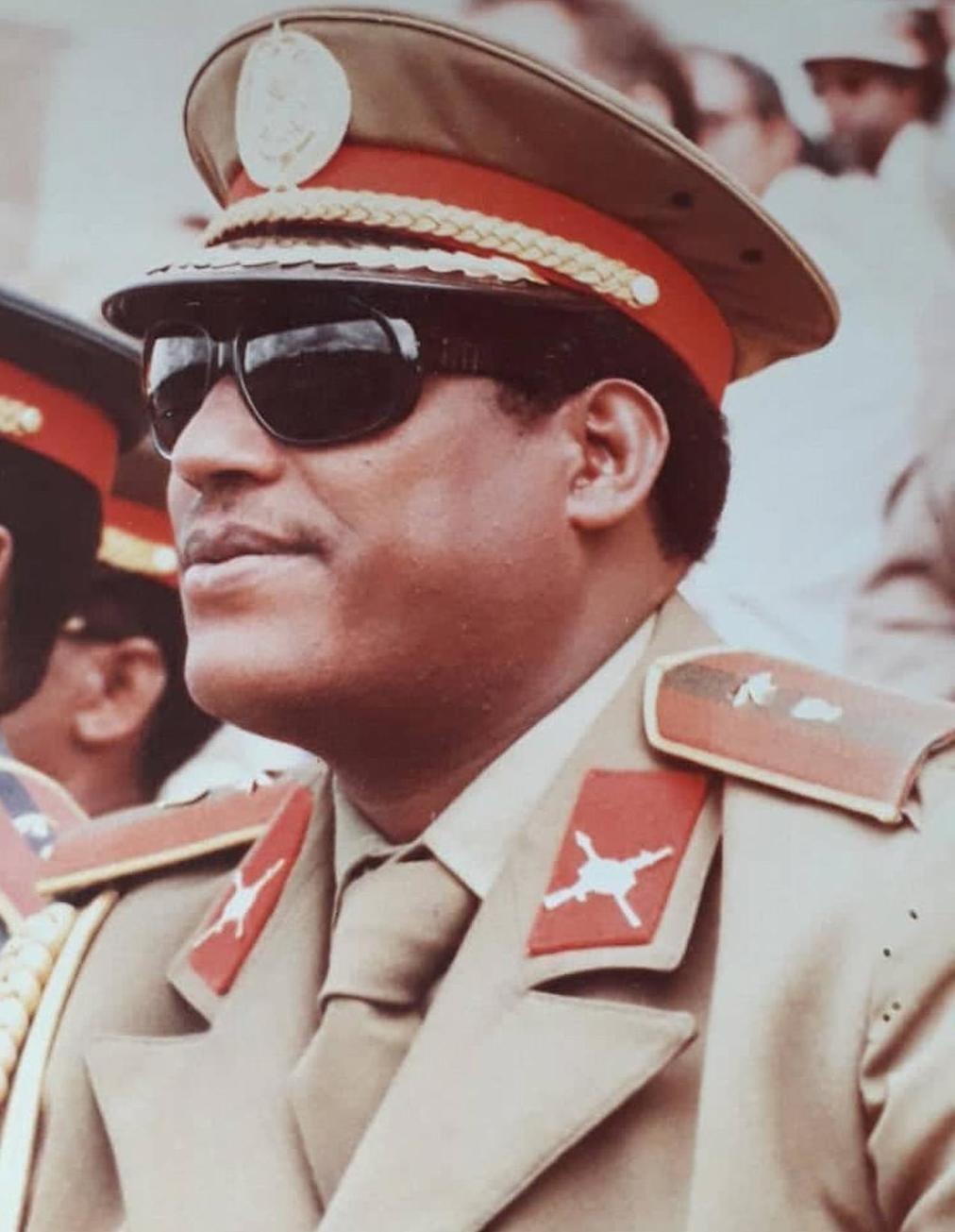

Vice President of Ethiopia
- In office 10 September 1987 – 26 April 1991
- President: Mengistu Haile Mariam
- Preceded by: Position established
- Succeeded by: Tesfaye Gebre Kidan

Member of the Central Committee of COPWE
- In office 1979–1984

Personal details
- Born: 21 April 1941 Adwa, Italian East Africa (now Tigray, Ethiopia)
- Died: 7 May 2022 (aged 81) Addis Ababa, Ethiopia
- Party: Workers' Party of Ethiopia; 1984–1991

Military service
- Allegiance: Ethiopian Empire; Derg
- Branch/service: Ethiopian Army
- Years of service: 1961-1991
- Rank: Lieutenant Colonel
- Unit: First Division; Third Division
- Battles/wars: Eritrean War of Independence; Ethiopian Civil War

Fisseha Desta (Tigrinya: ፍስሃ ደስታ; 21 April 1941 – 7 May 2022) was an Ethiopian military officer and politician who was the first vice president of Ethiopia from 1987 to 1991.

== Early life ==
Fisseha Desta was born into a family of Tigrayan nobility in Adwa. His family then moved to Addis Ababa in 1947. He joined the Ethiopian Army at the age of 20 and graduated from the Harar Military Academy. Three years later, he joined the Kebur Zabagna (Imperial Bodyguard) and was specifically assigned to the Emperor's Palace. He later received advanced military training in the United States.

== Career ==
When the Derg came to power in 1974 Fisseha became a senior member of the military committee and rose to the rank of lieutenant colonel. He was in command of the Third Division and had served in Eritrea. In 1979 Fisseha became a member of the Central Committee of COPWE. In 1980 Fisseha traveled to several Arab nations in order to convince them to cease their support to the Eritrean rebels. He met with Saddam Hussein who believed that Muslims were being persecuted in Eritrea, Fisseha used the case of Kurds to explain the Eritrean cause which is when Saddam Hussein recommended federation for Eritrea.

After the formation of the Workers' Party of Ethiopia in 1984, Fisseha was appointed the deputy leader of the WPE and was the head of its administration and justice department. In 1987 after the establishment of the People's Democratic Republic of Ethiopia, Fisseha was appointed vice president, a position he held until 1991.

== Later life ==
In the 1990s Fisseha was sentenced to 20 years in prison for his role in the military dictatorship. He was then released in 2011 on parole.

=== Death ===
Fisseha died at midnight on 7 May 2022 in the capital Addis Ababa. His funeral was held on 8 May 2022, at the Holy Trinity Cathedral in Addis Ababa.
