= Tafari Benti =

Ethiopian military officer; chairman of the Derg from 1974 to 1977

Brigadier General Tafari Benti
- ተፈሪ በንቲ
- Tafari in 1974

Chairman of the Derg De facto head of state of Ethiopia
- In office 28 November 1974 – 3 February 1977
- Monarch: Asfaw Wossen^{1} (until 1975)
- Deputy: Mengistu Haile Mariam; Atnafu Abate
- Preceded by: Mengistu Haile Mariam
- Succeeded by: Mengistu Haile Mariam

Personal details
- Born: 11 October 1921 Addis Ababa, Empire of Ethiopia
- Died: 3 February 1977 (aged 55) Addis Ababa, Ethiopia
- Cause of death: Summary execution by shooting
- Party: None (military regime)

Military service
- Allegiance: Ethiopian Empire (Ethiopia) Derg
- Branch/service: Ethiopian Army
- Years of service: 1941–1977
- Rank: Brigadier General
- Unit: Second Division; Third Division; Fourth Division
- Battles/wars: Eritrean War of Independence
- ^{1}Crown Prince Asfaw Wossen Tafari had been declared "King-designate" by the Derg but made no move to acknowledge the title, instead recognizing his father, Haile Selassie I, as remaining the de jure Emperor

Brigadier General Tafari Benti (Amharic: ተፈሪ በንቲ, romanized: teferī bentī; 11 October 1921 – 3 February 1977) was an Ethiopian military officer and politician who served as head of state of Ethiopia from 1974 to 1977 in his role as second chairman of the Derg, the ruling military junta. His official title was Chairman of the Provisional Military Administrative Council.

== Early life and career ==
Of ethnic Oromo descent, Tafari Benti joined the Ethiopian Army at the age of 20, graduated from the Holetta Military Academy, and served in the Second, Third and Fourth Divisions of the army. In 1967, he served as a military attaché in Washington, D.C. where he and several other Ethiopian colleagues suffered from racial discrimination.

On 23 November 1974, Lt. General Aman Mikael Andom, the first chairman of the Derg and acting head of state, who had been in a struggle for power with the other members of the Derg, was killed in a shootout at his home. Mengistu Haile Mariam served as interim chairman until the Derg appointed Tafari to the position. He had been serving as brigadier general in the Fourth Division, which was stationed in Asmara, at the time of his appointment.

== Tenure ==
During his tenure, Tafari presented himself as the public face of the ruling junta. According to the Ottaways, while at first, he was "a neutral and powerless figure", in the end "he was too colorless, soft-spoken, and undemonstrative to be the figurehead of the revolution." However, according to Rene LaFort's account, Tafari offered some hints that he supported those opposed to Mengistu. One such hint was in July 1975, when in a public speech he made overtures to the civilian left—groups which included the Ethiopian People's Revolutionary Party (EPRP) and MEISON—proposing a united front "of all the forces that rejected the ancient regime, built from the base, that is from the mass organizations born of the great reforms"; LaFort points out that this was "a strategy which Mengistu Haile Mariam and his supporters opposed and would continue to oppose more and more resolutely." He repeated this message in a speech on the first anniversary of the deposition of Emperor Haile Selassie.

During his mandate, he constituted the public face of the Government Board, delivering the public announcements of the Derg. Among which was an announcement made on 11 September 1975, in which the Derg declared it would create a political party to support its objectives aligned with the Communist Party of the Soviet Union. During his government, in March 1975, the monarchy would finally be officially abolished, proclaiming its replacement by a socialist government of Marxist-Leninist inspiration.

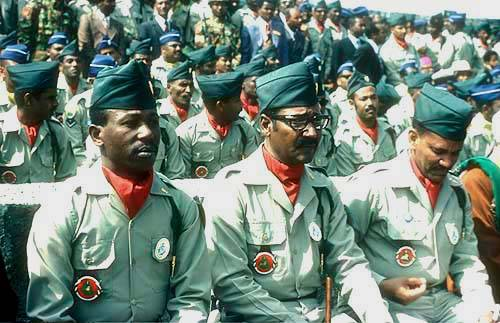
Leaders of the Derg Mengistu, Benti and Abate, c. 1974–1977

Over the following months, according to LaFort the Derg was split over irreconcilable objectives: "How could the authority of the Committee be strengthened while avoiding the dangers of authoritarianism, and how could the principles of collegiality be maintained while gaining maximum benefit from a concentration of power?" And behind this split was concern at Mengistu's growing power. To end this split, the Derg set up a committee chaired by Captain Mogus Wolde Mikael to reform the Derg's structure. After nine weeks of what LaFort describes as "strenuous internal negotiations", on 29 December 1976 Tafari delivered a speech, announcing that the Derg had been restructured. The reorganization limited Mengistu's powers and sent his supporters out of the capital to positions in the countryside; on the other hand, two of the key architects of this reform, Captain Mogus and Captain Almayahu Haile, were appointed to powerful positions. His enemies had thought they had clipped Mengistu's wings and had removed him as a threat. Tafari went even further and, flanked by Captains Mogus and Almayahu, criticized the lack of a vanguard party in words which LaFort interprets as declaring "the bloody war between MEISON and the EPRP to be politically unjustifiable, and that it should, in any case, remain limited to the civilian Left without the army intervening in any way."

In 1976, open clashes between members of the two largest Marxist-Leninist organizations began in the country. They grew into the murders of supporters of Mengistu and government employees. Thus, trade union leaders Theodoros Bekel and Themeslin Medé were killed. In September 1976, EPRP members made an assassination attempt on Mengistu himself, which enraged the latter.

== Death ==
Despite this apparent setback, Mengistu proved to be far more resourceful than his opponents believed. He conspired with his longtime friend and ally Lieutenant Colonel Daniel Asfaw to round up Tafari and other Derg members suspected of conspiring with the EPRP. During a routine meeting on 3 February 1977, Tafari and the other Derg members suspected of conspiring with the EPRP were arrested by soldiers under the command of Lieutenant Colonel Daniel. According to the memoirs of Fikre Selassie Wogderess, they were then led into a dark garage located in the compound and locked up. Fikre Selassie was also present at the meeting and was mistakenly arrested along with Tafari and the other suspect Derg members. However, Daniel arrived at the garage in time and released Fikre before the summary execution of the others. Shortly thereafter soldiers armed with automatic weapons and silencers arrived and assassinated Tafari and the suspect Derg members: Lieutenant Alemayehu Haile, Captain Mogus Wolde Michael, Corporal Hailu Belay, Lieutenant Colonel Asrat Desta, Lieutenant Colonel Hiruy Haile Selassie and Captain Tefera Deneke. Later, in the evening, a shootout opened in the same compound by another suspected EPRP conspirator Major Yohannes Tiku, where he killed Lieutenant Colonel Daniel and Senay Likke. Major Yohannes was also killed in the shootout.

Shortly afterwards, Radio Ethiopia broadcast a charge by Mengistu that Tafari and his associates had been killed because they were secret supporters of the EPRP. Mengistu claimed he had discovered a 47-page master plan in Tafari's possession, which detailed how the EPRP would replace the "scientific socialism" of the Derg.

Fidel Castro had the opinion that one reason why Tarafi was overthrown was due to his nationalism.

Political offices
Preceded by Aman Mikael Andom	Head of state of Ethiopia; 1974–1977	Succeeded by Mengistu Haile Mariam
