= Telephone numbers in Ethiopia =

- Country: Ethiopia
- Continent: Africa
- Regulator: ETA-Ethiopian Telecommunications Authority
- Numbering plan type: closed
- NSN length: 9
- Format: 0yy xxx xxxx
- Country code: +251
- International access: 00
- Long-distance: 0

The following are the telephone codes in Ethiopia.

== Calling formats ==
- xxx xxxx - calling within an area code
- 0yy xxx xxxx - calling within Ethiopia
- +251 yy xxx xxxx - calling from outside Ethiopia

The NSN length is nine digits.

Mobile numbers start with 9 for Ethio telecom and 7 for Safaricom.

09X XXX-XXXX for Ethio telecom domestic calls

07X XXX-XXXX for Safaricom domestic calls

+251 9X XXX-XXXX for overseas Ethio telecom calls

+251 7X XXX-XXXX for overseas Safaricom calls

== List of area codes in Ethiopia ==
List of area codes
Old format	New format	Place/service
+251 1 xxxxxx	+251 11 1xxxxxx	Addis Ababa North
+251 1 xxxxxx	+251 11 2xxxxxx	Addis Ababa West
+251 1 xxxxxx	+251 11 3xxxxxx	Addis Ababa Southwest
+251 1 xxxxxx	+251 11 4xxxxxx	Addis Ababa South
+251 1 xxxxxx	+251 11 5xxxxxx	Addis Ababa Central
+251 1 xxxxxx	+251 11 kkkk	Addis Ababa East
+251 1 251xxxx	+251 11 651xxxx	WLL Addis Ababa East
+251 1 252xxxx	+251 11 652xxxx	WLL Addis Ababa South
+251 1 253xxxx	+251 11 653xxxx	WLL Addis Ababa Southwest
+251 1 254xxxx	+251 11 654xxxx	WLL Addis Ababa West
+251 1 255xxxx	+251 11 655xxxx	WLL Addis Ababa Central and North
+251 2 axxxxx	+251 22 aaxxxxx	Southeast region (Nazareth)
+251 3 axxxxx	+251 33 aaxxxxx	Northeast region (Assab, Dessie)
+251 4 axxxxx	+251 34 aaxxxxx	North region (Mekele)
+251 5 axxxxx	+251 25 aaxxxxx	Eastern region (Dire Dawa)
+251 6 axxxxx	+251 46 aaxxxxx	South region (Awassa, Shashamane)
+251 7 axxxxx	+251 47 aaxxxxx	Southwest region (Jimma)
+251 7 axxxxx	+251 57 aaxxxxx	Western region (Ghedo)
+251 8 axxxxx	+251 58 aaxxxxx	Northwest region (Gonder)
+251 9 xxxxxx	+251 91 1xxxxxx	GSM mobile Addis Ababa and area
+251 9 xxxxxx	+251 91 4xxxxxx	GSM mobile Northern region
+251 9 xxxxxx	+251 91 5xxxxxx	GSM mobile East region
+251 9 xxxxxx	+251 91 6xxxxxx	GSM mobile Southern region
+251 9 xxxxxx	+251 91 7xxxxxx	GSM mobile Western region
+251 9 xxxxxx	+251 91 8xxxxxx	GSM mobile Northwestern region
+251 9 11xxxx	+251 98 111xxxx	VSAT Faraway
+251 9 19xxxx	+251 98 119xxxx	VSAT Dialaway

Area codes were revised in 2005. The new area codes are as shown below.

=== Numbering plan for PSTN services in Addis Ababa and its surroundings ===
List of area codes
Area name	Code and number
Arada I	011 111XXXX
Arada II	011 112XXXX
French Legation	011 114XXXX
Sidist Kilo I	011 122XXXX
Sidist Kilo II	011 123XXXX
Sidist Kilo III	011 124XXXX
Sidist Kilo Rss I	011 125XXXX
Addisu Gebeya	011 127XXXX
Kuyu	011 131XXXX
Alem Ketema	011 1320XXX
Deber Tsige	011 1330XXX
Muke Turi	011 1340XXX
Fitche	011 135XXXX
Arada III	011 155XXXX
Arada IV	011 156XXXX
Arada V	011 157XXXX
Arada VI	011 158XXXX
Sululta	011 1860XXX
Goha Tsion	011 187XXXX
Chancho	011 188XXXX
Addis Ketema I	011 213XXXX
Hagere Hiwot	011 236XXXX
Holeta Gent	011 237XXXX
Jeldu	011 238XXXX
Ginchi	011 2580XXX
Shegole	011 259XXXX
Asko	011 270XXXX
Addis Ketema II	011 275XXXX
Addis Ketema III	011 276XXXX
Addis Ketema IV	011 277XXXX
Addis Ketema VI	011 278XXXX
Kolfe	011 279XXXX
Guder	011 2820XXX
Addis Alem	011 283XXXX
Burayu	011 284XXXX
Wolenkomi	011 2850XXX
Enchini	011 2860XXX
Old Airport I	011 320XXXX
Mekanisa	011 321XXXX
Wolkite	011 330XXXX
Endibir	011 3310XXX
Gunchire	011 3320XXX
Sebeta	011 3380XXX
Teji	011 3390XXX
Ghion	011 341XXXX
Tullu Bollo	011 3420XXX
Jimmaber (Ayer Tena)	011 348XXXX
Keranyo	011 349XXXX
Old Airport II	011 371XXXX
Old Airport III	011 372XXXX
Old Airport IV	011 373XXXX
Old Airport V	011 374XXXX
Alem Gena	011 3870XXX
Keira I	011 416XXXX
Hana Mariam	011 419XXXX
Dukem	011 432XXXX
Debre Zeit	011 433XXXX
Akaki	011 434XXXX
Kaliti	011 439XXXX
Nifas Silk III	011 440XXXX
Nifas Silk I	011 442XXXX
Nifas Silk II	011 443XXXX
Keria II	011 465XXXX
Keria III	011 466XXXX
Keira IV	011 467XXXX
Keria V	011 468XXXX
Filwoha II	011 515XXXX
Sheraton/DID	011 517XXXX
ECA	011 544XXXX
Filwoha IV	011 550XXXX
Filwoha III	011 551XXXX
Filwha VI	011 552XXXX
Filwha V	011 553XXXX
Filwha VII	011 554XXXX
Bole I	011 618XXXX
Bole Michael	011 626XXXX
Gerji	011 629XXXX
YekaI	011 645XXXX
Yeka II	011 646XXXX
Yeka Rss III	011 647XXXX
Kotebe	011 660XXXX
Bole II	011 661XXXX
Bole III	011 662XXXX
Bole IV	011 663XXXX
Bole V	011 6640XXX
Civil Aviation	011 6650XXX
Bole VI	011 669XXXX
Debre Sina	011 680XXXX
Debre Birehan	011 681XXXX
Mehal Meda	011 685XXXX
Sendafa	011 6860XXX
Sheno	011 6870XXX
Enwari	011 6880XXX

=== Numbering plan for WLL services in Addis Ababa ===
List of area codes
Code	Number
East Addis Ababa Zone	011 651XXXX
South Addis Ababa Zone	011 652XXXX
South-West Addis Ababa Zone	011 653XXXX
West Addis Ababa Zone	011 654XXXX
Central Addis Ababa Zone & North Addis Ababa Zone	011 655XXXX

=== Numbering plan for PSTN services in Regions ===
==== South-East Region ====
List of area codes
Area name	Code and number
Nazreth I	022 111XXXX
Nazreth II	022 112XXXX
Wolenchiti	022 113XXXX
Melkawarer	022 114XXXX
Alem Tena	022 115XXXX
Modjo	022 116XXXX
Meki	022 118XXXX
WLL-Nazreth	022 119XXXX
Wonji	022 220XXXX
Shoa	022 221XXXX
Arerti	022 223XXXX
Awash	022 224XXXX
Melkasa	022 225XXXX
Metehara	022 226XXXX
Agarfa	022 227XXXX
Sire	022 330XXXX
Asela	022 331XXXX
Bokoji	022 332XXXX
Dera	022 333XXXX
Huruta	022 334XXXX
Iteya	022 335XXXX
Assasa	022 336XXXX
Kersa	022 337XXXX
Sagure	022 338XXXX
Diksis	022 339XXXX
Abomsa	022 441XXXX
Ticho	022 444XXXX
Gobesa	022 446XXXX
Goro	022 447XXXX
Bale Goba	022 661XXXX
Gessera	022 662XXXX
Adaba	022 663XXXX
Ghinir	022 664XXXX
Robe	022 665XXXX
Dodolla	022 666XXXX
Dolomena	022 668XXXX

==== North-East Region ====
List of area codes
Area name	Code and number
Kabe	033 110XXXX
Dessie I	033 111XXXX
Dessie II	033 112XXXX
Kobo Robit	033 113XXXX
Akesta	033 114XXXX
Wore-ilu	033 116XXXX
Tenta	033 117XXXX
Senbete	033 118XXXX
Mekana Selam	033 220XXXX
Bistima	033 221XXXX
Hayk	033 222XXXX
Mille	033 223XXXX
Wuchale	033 224XXXX
Elidar	033 225XXXX
Jama	033 226XXXX
Sirinka	033 330XXXX
Woldia	033 331XXXX
Mersa	033 333XXXX
Kobo	033 334XXXX
Lalibela	033 336XXXX
Bure	033 338XXXX
Manda	033 339XXXX
Sekota	033 440XXXX
Ansokia	033 444XXXX
Logia	033 550XXXX
Kombolcha	033 551XXXX
Harbu	033 552XXXX
Bati	033 553XXXX
Kemise	033 554XXXX
Assayta	033 555XXXX
Dupti	033 556XXXX
Majate	033 660XXXX
Epheson	033 661XXXX
Shoa Robit	033 664XXXX
Semera	033 666XXXX
Decheotto	033 667XXXX
Dire Dawa	047 5XXXXXX

==== North Region ====
List of area codes
Area name	Code and number
Mekele I	034 440XXXX
Mekele II	034 441XXXX
Quiha	034 442XXXX
Wukro	034 443XXXX
Shire Endasselassie	034 444XXXX
Adigrat	034 445XXXX
Abi Adi	034 446XXXX
Senkata	034 447XXXX
Humera	034 448XXXX
Shiraro	034 550XXXX
Korem	034 551XXXX
Betemariam	034 552XXXX
A.Selam	034 554XXXX
Rama	034 555XXXX
Adi Daero	034 556XXXX
WLL-Mekele	034 559XXXX
Adi Gudem	034 660XXXX
Endabaguna	034 661XXXX
Mai-Tebri	034 662XXXX
Waja	034 663XXXX
Adwa	034 771XXXX
Inticho	034 772XXXX
Edaga-Hamus	034 773XXXX
Alemata	034 774XXXX
Axum	034 775XXXX

==== Eastern Region ====
List of area codes
Area name	Code and number
DireDawa I	025 111XXXX
Dire Dawa II	025 112XXXX
Shinile	025 114XXXX
Artshek	025 115XXXX
Melka Jeldu	025 116XXXX
Bedeno	025 332XXXX
Deder	025 333XXXX
Grawa	025 334XXXX
Chelenko	025 335XXXX
Kersa	025 336XXXX
Kobo	025 337XXXX
Kombolocha	025 338XXXX
Hirna	025 441XXXX
Miesso	025 444XXXX
Erer	025 446XXXX
Hurso	025 447XXXX
Asebe Teferi	025 551XXXX
Assebot	025 554XXXX
Alemaya	025 661XXXX
Aweday	025 662XXXX
Babile	025 665XXXX
Harar I	025 666XXXX
Harar II	025 667XXXX
Kebribeyah	025 669XXXX
Degahabur	025 771XXXX
Gursum	025 772XXXX
Kabri Dehar	025 774XXXX
Jigiga	025 775XXXX
Godie	025 776XXXX
Teferi Ber	025 777XXXX
Chinagson	025 779XXXX
Kelafo	025 880XXXX

==== South Region ====
List of area codes
Area name	Code and number
Shashamane I	046 110XXXX
Shashamane II	046 111XXXX
Kofele	046 112XXXX
Wondo Kela	046 114XXXX
Butajira	046 115XXXX
Arsi Negele	046 116XXXX
Adame Tulu	046 117XXXX
Kuyera	046 118XXXX
WLL-Shasemene	046 119XXXX
Awassa I	046 220XXXX
Awassa II	046 221XXXX
Wonda Basha	046 222XXXX
Aleta Wondo	046 224XXXX
Yirgalem	046 225XXXX
Leku	046 226XXXX
Chuko	046 227XXXX
Dilla	046 331XXXX
Yirga-Chefe	046 332XXXX
Wonago	046 333XXXX
Shakiso	046 334XXXX
Adola	046 335XXXX
Ziway	046 441XXXX
Bule Hora	046 443XXXX
Moyale	046 444XXXX
Negele Guji	046 445XXXX
Yabello	046 446XXXX
Dolo Odo	046 449XXXX
Wolaita Sodo	046 551XXXX
Durame	046 554XXXX
Hossena	046 555XXXX
Alaba Kulito	046 556XXXX
Enseno	046 558XXXX
Boditi	046 559XXXX
Kebado	046 660XXXX
Werabe	046 771XXXX
Gidole	046 774XXXX
Sawla	046 777XXXX
Arba Minch	046 881XXXX
Kibet	046 882XXXX
Buii	046 883XXXX
Arbaminch-WLL	046 881XXXX
Areka	046 553XXXX

==== South Western Region ====
List of area codes
Area name	Code and number
Jimma I	047 111XXXX
Jimma II	047 112XXXX
Serbo	047 113XXXX
Assendabo	047 114XXXX
Omonada	047 115XXXX
Seka	047 116XXXX
Sekoru	047 117XXXX
Shebe	047 118XXXX
WLL-Jimma	047 119XXXX
Agaro	047 221XXXX
Ghembo	047 222XXXX
Dedo	047 223XXXX
Limmu Genet	047 224XXXX
Haro	047 225XXXX
Yebu	047 226XXXX
Atnago	047 228XXXX
Ghembe	047 229XXXX
Bonga	047 331XXXX
Yayo	047 333XXXX
Maji	047 334XXXX
Mizan Teferi	047 335XXXX
Aman	047 336XXXX
Chora	047 337XXXX
Metu	047 441XXXX
Dembi	047 443XXXX
Darimu	047 444XXXX
Bedele	047 445XXXX
Hurumu	047 446XXXX
Gambela	047 551XXXX
Itang	047 552XXXX
Jikawo	047 553XXXX
Gore	047 554XXXX
Tepi	047 556XXXX
Macha	047 558XXXX
Abebo	047 559XXXX

==== Western Region ====
List of area codes
Area name	Code and number
Ghedo	057 227XXXX
Ejaji	057 550XXXX
Dembidolo	057 555XXXX
Nekemte	057 661XXXX
Fincha	057 664XXXX
Backo	057 665XXXX
Shambu	057 666XXXX
Amuru	057 639XXXX
Arjo	057 667XXXX
Sire	057 668XXXX
Ghimbi	057 771XXXX
Nedjo	057 774XXXX
Assosa	057 775XXXX
Mendi	057 776XXXX
Billa	057 777XXXX
Guliso	057 778XXXX
Begi	057 641XXXX

==== North Western Region ====
List of area codes
Area name	Code and number
Gonder	058 111XXXX
Azezo	058 114XXXX
Gilgel Beles	058 119XXXX
Bahir-dar I	058 220XXXX
Dangla	058 221XXXX
Durbette/ Abcheklite	058 223XXXX
Gimjabetmariam	058 224XXXX
Chagni/Metekel	058 225XXXX
Bahirdar II	058 226XXXX
Enjibara Kosober	058 227XXXX
Tilili	058 229XXXX
Merawi	058 330XXXX
Metema	058 331XXXX
Maksegnit	058 332XXXX
Chilga	058 333XXXX
Chewahit	058 334XXXX
Kola-deba	058 335XXXX
Delgi	058 336XXXX
Adet	058 338XXXX
Ebinat	058 440XXXX
Debre-tabour	058 441XXXX
Hamusit	058 443XXXX
Addis zemen	058 444XXXX
Nefas mewcha	058 445XXXX
Worota	058 446XXXX
Mekane-eyesus	058 447XXXX
Teda	058 448XXXX
Pawe	058 550XXXX
Motta	058 661XXXX
Keraniyo	058 662XXXX
Debre-work	058 663XXXX
Gunde-woin	058 664XXXX
Bichena	058 665XXXX
Mankusa	058 770XXXX
Debre-Markos I	058 771XXXX
Lumame	058 772XXXX
Denbecha	058 773XXXX
Bure	058 774XXXX
Finote-selam	058 775XXXX
Dejen	058 776XXXX
Amanuel	058 777XXXX
Debre Markos II	058 778XXXX
Jiga	058 779XXXX
