= Alem Zewde Tessema =

Ethiopian military officer (died 1974)

Alem Zewde Tessema (died 1974) was an Ethiopian military figure. He was a colonel of the Airborne Corps, Fourth Division. He was active at the beginning of the Ethiopian Revolution, helping to create the "Coordinating Committee of the Armed Forces", which originally was intended to support Prime Minister Aklilu Habte-Wold but came under the control of Majors Atnafu Abate, Sisay Hapte, and Tafara Tekleab, who turned it into the group later known as the Derg.

On 22 June 1974, he lost control of his own paratrooper battalion after its defeat at Bishoftu with radicals, and was forced to flee to Gojjam, where he subsequently died.
