= Chief executive (head of government) =

Term for a head of government

Chief executive is a term for a head of government that allows its holder to perform various functions. The term can also apply to heads of state as well, though it is less common. The term may refer to the title of the position, but many constituencies place this power in a position with a different title (e.g., president or prime minister).

== Description ==
Chief executive is a term for a head of government (e.g., presidential, prime ministerial, or gubernatorial powers) given by a constitution or basic law, which allows its holder to perform various functions that may include implementing policy, supervising the executive branch of government, preparing an executive budget for submission to the legislature, appointing and removing executive officials, vetoing laws, dissolving the legislature, and submitting their own bills to the legislature.

== Positions titled chief executive ==
In most cases the title of chief executive is not directly used as the title of the office. The powers are often given to a position with another name, such as president, governor-general, governor, lieutenant-governor, administrator, high commissioner, commissioner, premier, or minister-president. There are a few offices formally styled chief executive:

- In the two special administrative regions of the People's Republic of China, which were previously under British and Portuguese rule until the transfer of sovereignty in the late 20th century, the chief executive are the political and executive leaders of the regions and of their respective governments:

Title	Created	Superseded / defunct
Chief Executive of Hong Kong	1997	Governor of Hong Kong
Chief Executive of Macau	1999	Governor of Macau

- In Northern Ireland, the chief executive refers to the leader of the Northern Ireland Executive, the devolved government of Northern Ireland for five months in 1974.
- In Mauritius, since 12 October 2002, autonomy was granted to the island of Rodrigues, resulting in the creation of its own chief executive.
- While not a government, the Ross Dependency, part of the Realm of New Zealand, is a Crown entity managed by a board of directors reporting to the Minister of Foreign Affairs, and the chair acts as the chief executive.
- The head of government in the Falkland Islands is known as the chief executive.
- Historically, the head of government of the Ryukyu Islands was known as the chief executive. The functions were largely superseded by that of the Governor of Okinawa Prefecture upon retrocession of the islands to Japan as a prefecture.

== Sources and references ==
- WorldStatesmen - see each present country
