= March 1977 =

Month in 1977

| << | March 1977 | | | | | >> |
| Su | Mo | Tu | We | Th | Fr | Sa |
| | | 1 | 2 | 3 | 4 | 5 |
| 6 | 7 | 8 | 9 | 10 | 11 | 12 |
| 13 | 14 | 15 | 16 | 17 | 18 | 19 |
| 20 | 21 | 22 | 23 | 24 | 25 | 26 |
| 27 | 28 | 29 | 30 | 31 |

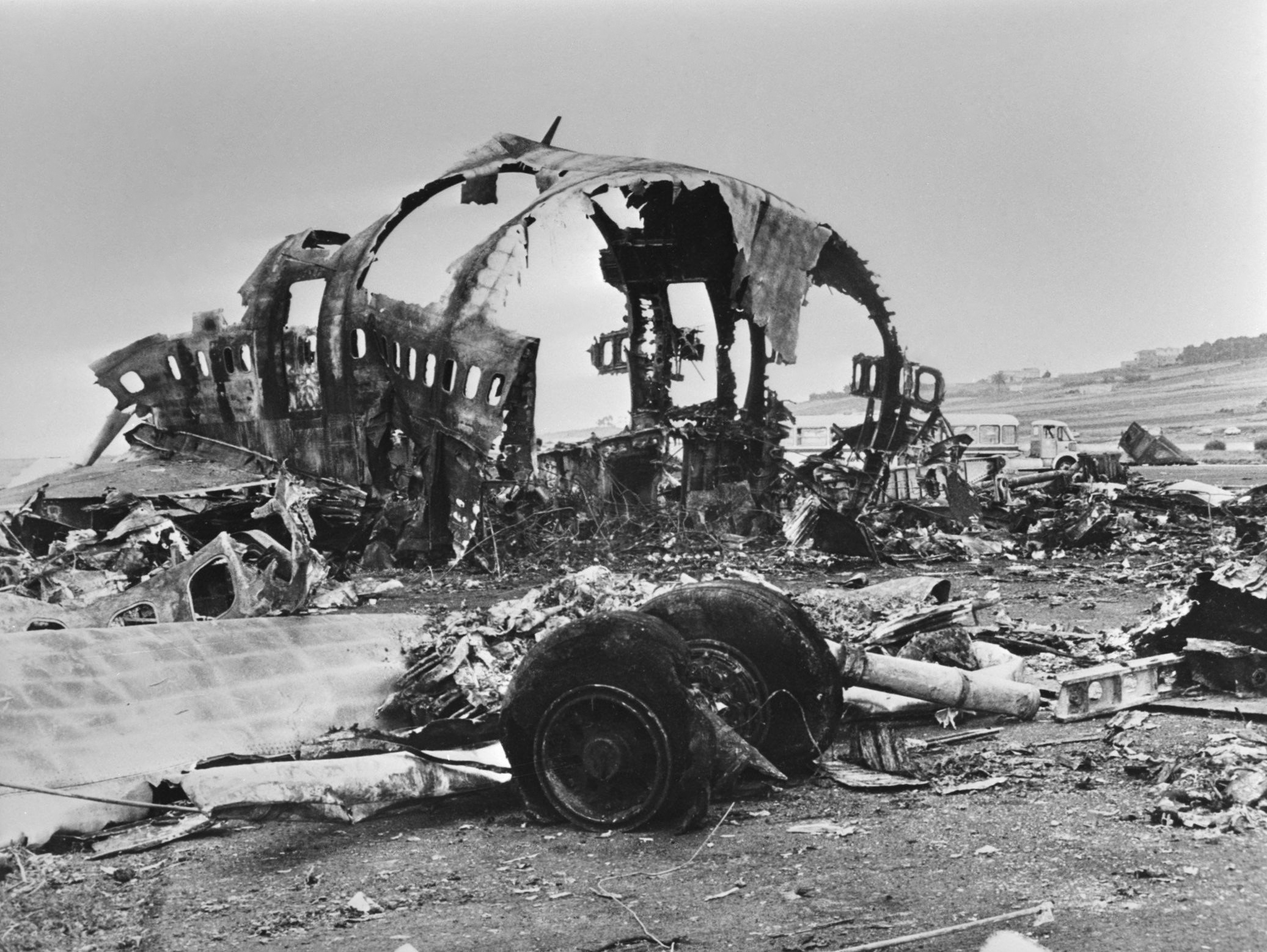
March 27, 1977: Collision of two Boeing 747 airliners kills 583 people at Tenerife on the Canary Islands

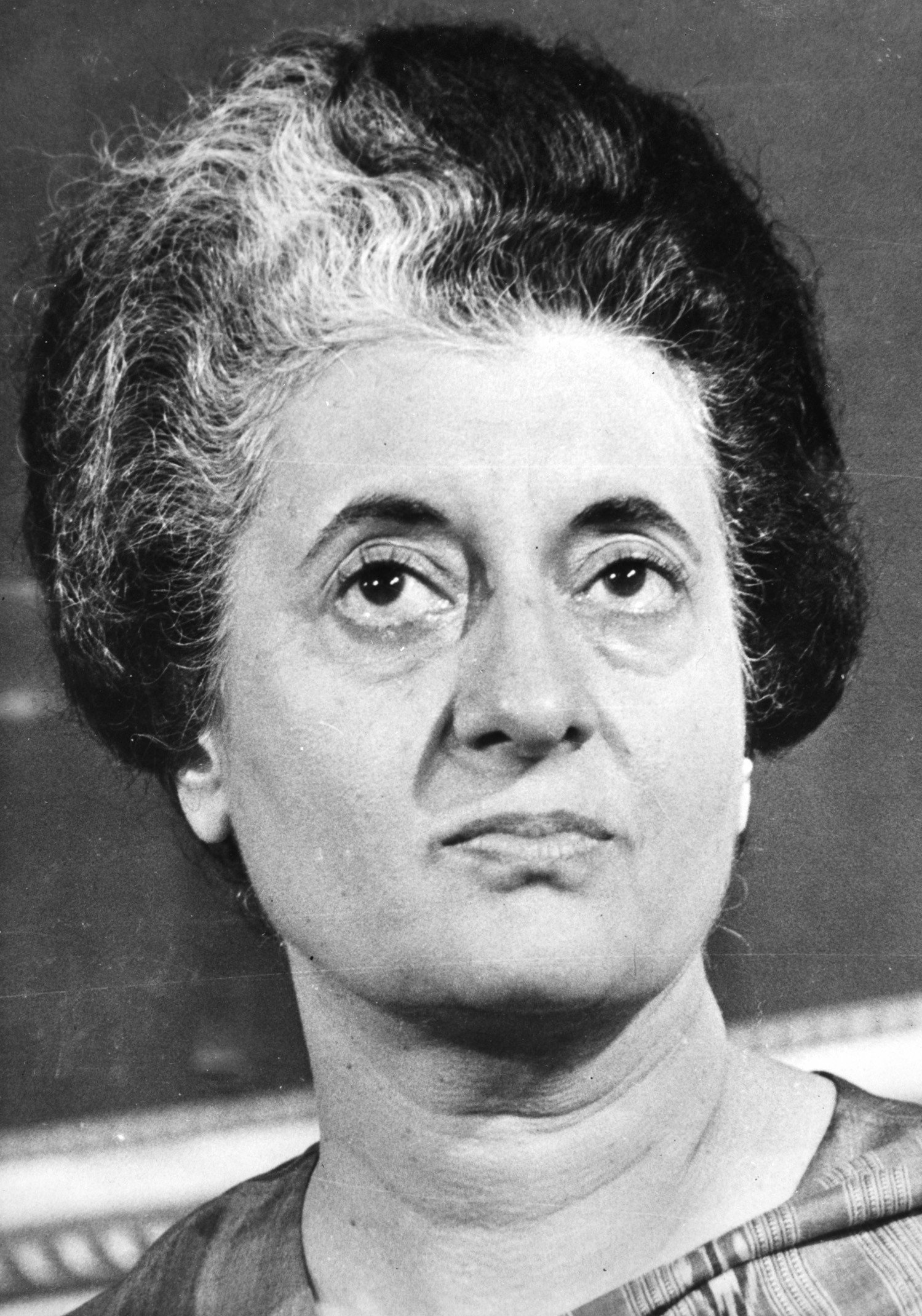
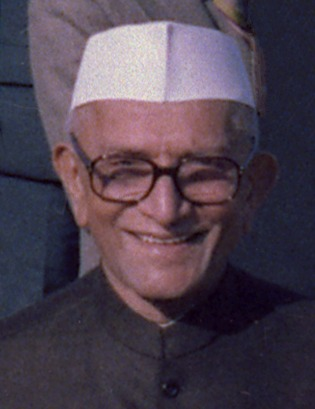
March 20, 1977: India's Prime Minister Indira Gandhi voted out of office, replaced by Morarji Desai

March 2: The new flag of Libya with the color of Green is adopted by Muammar Gaddafi

The following events occurred in March 1977:

== March 1, 1977 (Tuesday) ==
- The crash of a Yemen Airlines flight killed all 19 people on board. Shortly after taking off from Aden with a destination of Sayun, the Douglas DC-3 airplane plunged into the Indian Ocean.
- India's unpopular Prime Minister Indira Gandhi was booed and jeered by tens of thousands of government workers as she spoke at a campaign rally in New Delhi, and thousands walked out. The Indian press noted that no Prime Minister of India had ever been booed in the capital. Mrs. Gandhi had been making a 20-minute speech to defend her 1975 proclamation of a state of emergency, as well as to justify her government's programs for family planning by sterilization and the demolition of slum housing occupied by impoverished residents.
- East Germany doubled the toll for a car to cross from West Berlin into East Berlin in order to discourage visits, raising the cost from 10 West German marks to 20 (equivalent to an increase from $4.20 to $8.40).
- With only three more states necessary for the proposed Equal Rights Amendment (ERA) to become part of the U.S. Constitution, the North Carolina state senate rejected the resolution. Although the vote in favor was 26 to 24, a two-thirds majority of at least 34 votes was required. On March 15, the state senate of Missouri, which had rejected the ERA in 1975, had only a 12 to 22 vote in favor.
- The Bank of America began the replacement of its BankAmericard credit cards to Visa cards, initially with both names on the card, starting with all cards with cards with an expiration date of March 1977.
- The Police, a rock trio made up of vocalist and bassist Sting (Gordon Sumner), guitarist Andy Summers and drummer Stewart Copeland, gave its first public performance, a 10-minute set at the Alexandria Club in Newport, Wales
- Born: Rens Blom, Dutch pole vaulter and 2005 world champion; in Munstergeleen
- Died: Alioune Dramé, 49, Planning Minister for the African nation of Guinea until his arrest in 1976, died from a slow execution by starvation, after being accused of attempting to overthrow President Sékou Touré.

== March 2, 1977 (Wednesday) ==
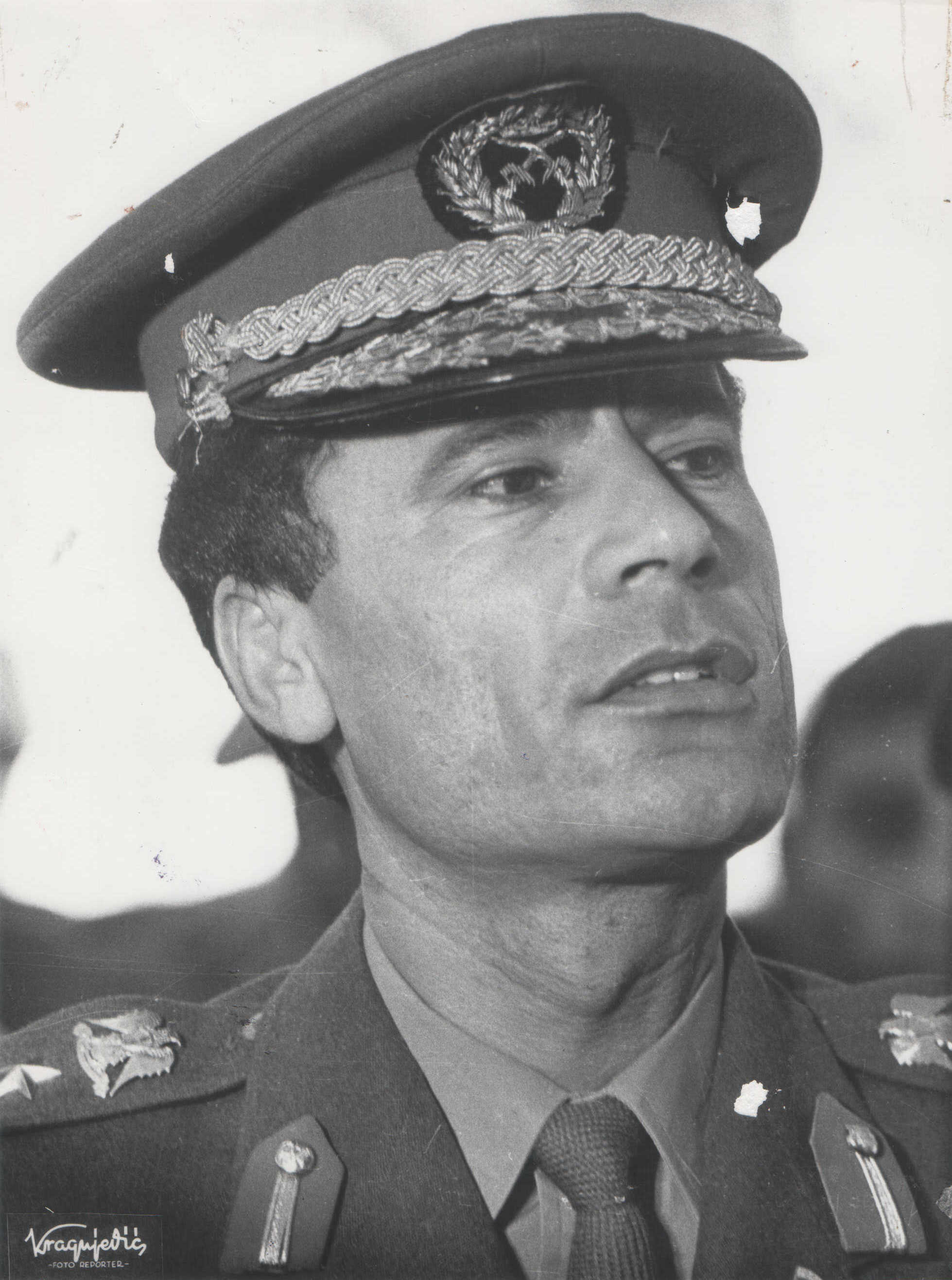
Muammar Gaddafi

- By decree of President Muammar Gaddafi, the Declaration on the Establishment of the Authority of the People changed the official name of the North African nation of Libya to the "Socialist People's Libyan Arab Jamahiriya", and assigned rule to a five-man secretariat leading the new General People's Congress. With Gaddafi as its Secretary General, the Secretariat included as members Prime Minister Abdessalam Jalloud and former Interior Minister Khwalidi Hemadi.
- The U.S. House of Representatives adopted a Code of Ethics for the first time.
- The U.S. Government's Alfred P. Murrah Federal Building opened in Oklahoma City, Oklahoma at 200 N.W. 5th Street. The Murrah Building would be destroyed by two American terrorists on April 19, 1995, in a bombing that would kill 168 people.
- Boston comedy club owner Jay Leno made his national television debut as a stand-up comedian, appearing on The Tonight Show. Leno was the guest of Johnny Carson, whom he would succeed as host 15 years later.
- Born: Chris Martin, British rock musician and lead vocalist for the band Coldplay; in Exeter, Devonshire
- Died: Eugénie Brazier, 81, French chef who had earned a total of six Michelin stars for her La Mère Brazier restaurants

== March 3, 1977 (Thursday) ==
- The crash of an Italian Air Force C-130 plane killed all 44 people on board as it was transporting 38 cadets from the Italian Naval Academy on a training flight. Shortly after takeoff from San Giusto Airport in Pisa, the transport plane struck the side of the 3,009 feet (917 m) Monte Serra at 2,800 feet (850 m) and caught fire.
- Born: Ronan Keating, Irish pop music singer; in Dublin
- Died:
  - Brian Faulkner, 56, the last Prime Minister of Northern Ireland within the UK, was killed when he was thrown from a horse while he was hunting. His death came less than 24 days after his February 7 receipt of a life peerage as The Lord Faulkner of Downpatrick and his elevation to the House of Lords.
  - Percy Marmont, 93, English film actor known as the star of the 1925 film Lord Jim

== March 4, 1977 (Friday) ==
- A 7.5 magnitude earthquake in the Carpathian Mountains of Romania killed 1,578 people and injured 11,221. Striking at 9:22 p.m. local time, the earthquake shook buildings as far away as Rome and Moscow. The epicenter was identified as a spot beneath Mount Vrancei about 135 miles (217 km) northeast of Bucharest, where 32 buildings were leveled (including 882 apartment units). In the Bulgarian town of Svishtov, on the Romanian border, 120 people were killed.
- The House of Assembly in the white-minority ruled African nation of Rhodesia voted, 44 to 22, to approve Prime Minister Ian Smith's partial reform of racial segregation laws that barred the nation's 6.4 million black residents from the same privileges available to its 272,000 white people.
- Born:
  - Nacho Figueras, Argentine polo star and male model; in Veinticinco de Mayo, Buenos Aires Province
  - Ana Guevara, Mexican track and field athlete, 2003 world champion in the women's 400m race, later a member of the Mexican Senate; in Nogales, Sonora
- Died:
  - William J. Bryan Jr., 52, American hypnotherapist
  - Andrés Caicedo, 25, Colombian novelist who attained posthumous fame for ¡Que viva la música!, committed suicide with an overdose of secobarbital on the same day of the book's publication.
  - Timmy Everett, 38, American stage and film actor and dancer known for The Music Man, died of a heart attack.
  - Lutz von Krosigk, 89, Finance Minister of Germany's Nazi government from 1932 to 1945, and the Third Reich's last Chancellor as Leitenden Minister (Leading Minister) for president Karl Doenitz after the death of Adolf Hitler. Convicted of war crimes, von Krosigk served six years of a 10-year sentence.

== March 5, 1977 (Saturday) ==
- "Ask President Carter", the first and only radio show allowing ordinary residents across the U.S. to call the President of the United States, was broadcast live on the CBS Radio Network. With CBS anchorman Walter Cronkite serving as moderator, U.S. President Jimmy Carter spoke with 42 people who had been able to get through to the White House after calling a special "900" number paid for by CBS.
- Japan became only the third nation to place a satellite into geosynchronous orbit, after easing the spacecraft (launched from Tanega Shima on February 23) into position over Indonesia. The launch marked the 10th satellite put into orbit by Japan.
- Born: Adler Volmar, U.S. and Haitian judo athlete; in Miami
- Died: Tom Pryce, 27, the only Welsh racecar driver to win a Formula One race, was killed along with a race official while racing in the South African Grand Prix in Midrand.

== March 6, 1977 (Sunday) ==
- Voters in the U.S. territory of the Northern Mariana Islands overwhelmingly approved the proposed constitution to establish the Northern Marianas as a self-governing Commonwealth within the United States. With a 58.5% turnout of the 6,500 registered voters, the result was 3,557 for and 258 against. The constitution would come into effect on January 9, 1978.
- The U.S. Senate Foreign Relations Committee revealed that U.S. military leaders had considered using the atomic bomb in 1953 during the Korean War, releasing a transcript of closed-door testimony to the Committee made by U.S. Army General Omar N. Bradley on February 10, 1953. General Bradley had told the Committee members, "We have discussed many times the use of the atomic bomb, tactically," but added, "Of course, you know there are no strategic targets worth mentioning in Korea. We have looked... and it is rather hard to find a target at this time that we think is sufficiently remunerative as a target for the expending out of the stockpile."

== March 7, 1977 (Monday) ==
- Voting was held in Pakistan for all 216 seats of the Qomi Assembly. Prime Minister Zulfiqar Ali Bhutto's Pakistan Peoples Party (PPP) won almost 60% of the vote and 155 seats, while the Pakistan National Alliance (PNA) of Abdul Wali Khan finished a distant second with 36 seats.
- By royal decree, King Juan Carlos I of Spain legalized gambling casinos for the first time in more than 50 years, acting as part of a plan to bring tourism to the Kingdom as it moved towards democracy. The King wrote in the decree that the 1924 ban on all games of chance (except for two state-operated lotteries and for soccer pools) had failed to stop gambling.
- Queen Elizabeth II of New Zealand announced that had appointed former Prime Minister Sir Keith Holyoake to serve as Governor-General of New Zealand, with authority to act on her behalf in the United Kingdom's Queen in her capacity as the monarch of New Zealand. The Queen was in New Zealand as part of a tour of the British Commonwealth's Asian nations during the 25th anniversary of her accession to the throne. He succeeded Governor-General Denis Blundell on October 26, 1977.
- Born: Ronan O'Gara, Irish rugby union player with 128 appearances in 14 seasons for the Ireland national team; to Irish parents in San Diego, California in the U.S.
- Died: Bernie Bierman, 82, U.S. college football coach who led the University of Minnesota to five national championships; Bierman's Minnesota Gophers teams are recognized by the NCAA as champions for 1934, 1935, 1936, 1940 and 1941, with the Gophers becoming the first Associated Press poll #1 at the end of the 1936 season, and the AP sports writers' favorite again in 1940 and 1941.

== March 8, 1977 (Tuesday) ==
- A group of mercenary soldiers and rebels from the Congolese National Liberation Front (FLNC) invaded Zaire, crossing from Angola into the former Katanga Province, which had been renamed by President Mobutu as the Shaba Province. The civil war would last for a little more than two months. In the opening drive, the rebels captured the towns of Dilolo, Kapanga and Kisengi, as well as Divuma and Kasaji. The Zairean Army recaptured Divuma and Kasaji three days later.
- The Australian Parliament was opened by Elizabeth II in her capacity as Queen of Australia.
- The debut album for the rock band Foreigner was released by Atlantic Records simultaneously with Foreigner's first 45 rpm single, "Feels Like the First Time".
- Born: James Van Der Beek, American TV actor known as the star of the series Dawson's Creek; in Cheshire, Connecticut (d. of colorectal cancer, 2026)
- Died:
  - Henry Hull, 86, American stage and film actor on film known for starring in 1935's Werewolf of London
  - Krishan Chander, 62, Indian novelist and screenwriter

== March 9, 1977 (Wednesday) ==
- Angered over perceived blasphemy in the film Mohammad, Messenger of God, a group of 12 armed U.S. Hanafi Muslims members invaded three buildings in Washington, D.C., and took 134 hostages. The sites attacked were the District Building, the Islamic Center of Washington mosque and the B'nai B'rith Headquarters. The leader of the siege was Hamaas Abdul Khaalis, whose four children were among seven victims in a mass murder in 1973 by Black Muslims targeting him. The siege would end 39 hours later. Future Washington DC Mayor Marion Barry, at the time a member of the D.C. City Council, was shot and wounded when the group opened fire during the building takeover.
- The U.S. Food and Drug Administration (FDA) announced that it was banning saccharin, the only artificial sweetener approved for use in the United States, after studies showed that large doses of the substance caused cancer in laboratory animals.
- Belgium's Prime Minister Leo Tindemans dissolved the 212-seat Chamber of Representatives and called for new elections on April 17. The move came after the collapse of the coalition government of his Social Christian Party with the Freedom and Progress Party and the Walloon Rally (a party of Belgium's French-speaking citizens). The Walloon MPs had abstained from a vote to approve the government's budget.
- U.S. Navy Admiral Stansfield Turner became the new Director of Central Intelligence, after being confirmed by the U.S. Senate following nomination by U.S. President Carter. Turner replaced Acting Director E. Henry Knoche; Carter's first choice, Ted Sorensen, had withdrawn from consideration after it was clear that the Senate would not confirm his appointment.
- Francine Hughes of Dansville, Michigan, killed her abusive ex-husband, Mickey Hughes, by setting his bed on fire while he was sleeping. She would be acquitted of the crime based on a defense of temporary insanity. The case would later be dramatized in a 1984 TV film, The Burning Bed.
- Died: Frances P. Bolton, 91, U.S. Representative for Ohio from 1940 to 1969 and the first woman to represent that state in Congress

== March 10, 1977 (Thursday) ==
- Two American astronomers, J. L. Elliot of Cornell University and Robert Millis of the Lowell Observatory, discovered that the planet Uranus, like Saturn, has rings.
- The Parliament of Italy voted to remove the immunity of two of the nation's former ministers of defense so that both could be tried on charges of corruption in the Lockheed bribery scandal. The members of both the Chamber of Deputies and the Italian Senate voted, 513 to 425, to allow charges to proceed against Mario Tanassi, and 487 to 451 against Luigi Gui, both of whom were incumbent members of parliament.
- A U.S. Air Force jet narrowly missed a mid-air collision with a Lufthansa jet liner that was carrying 58 persons in a flight over West Germany.
- Born:
  - Robin Thicke, American R&B pop singer-songwriter and actor; in Los Angeles
  - Shannon Miller, U.S. gymnast and 1996 Olympic gold medalist; in Rolla, Missouri
  - Bree Turner, American TV actress; in Palo Alto, California
- Died:
  - Willem Schermerhorn, 82, Prime Minister of the Netherlands from 1945 to 1946
  - E. Power Biggs, 70, British-born American concert organist

== March 11, 1977 (Friday) ==
- Brazil's Foreign Ministry announced that the South American nation was canceling its 1952 military assistance treaty with the United States, after the U.S. State Department had delivered a report of human rights abuses by the Brazilian government.
- The Hanafi Muslim takeover of three buildings in Washington ended as Hamaas Abdul Khaalis ordered 134 hostages released after negotiations with Washington police and diplomats from several Muslim nations, including Iran's ambassador to the U.S., Ardeshir Zahedi, and Pakistan's Ambassador Sahabzada Yaqub Khan. As part of the negotiations, four of the 12 terrorists, including Khaalis, were released without having to post bond. The 12 would be convicted in July on 139 of 373 counts arising from the crime.

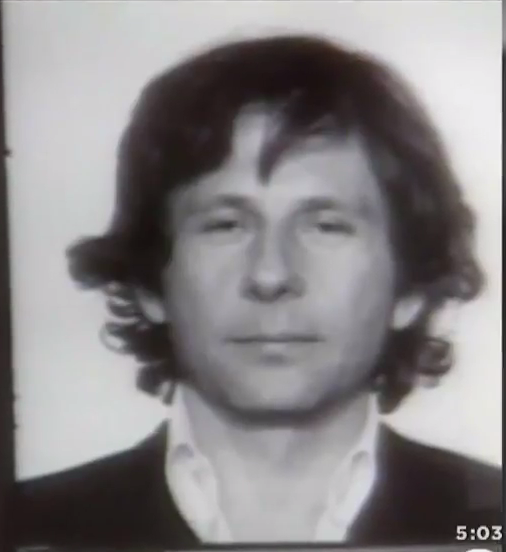
Polanski's mug shot

- Film director Roman Polanski was arrested by the Los Angeles Police Department at his room at the Beverly Wilshire Hotel on charges of raping a 13-year-old girl the night before at the Bel-Air home of actor Jack Nicholson. Nicholson had been out of town during the incident and no charges were filed against him.
- Born: Becky Hammon, American basketball player, WNBA all-star on six teams between 2003 and 2011, and the second woman in NBA history to serve as an assistant coach (for the San Antonio Spurs, 2014 to 2022); in Rapid City, South Dakota
- Died:
  - Carlo Felice Buzio, 110, Italian aviation engineer and supercentenarian known for designing the Macchi L.2 and other war planes for the Italian Navy during World War One
  - Ulysses S. Grant IV, 83, American paleontologist and grandson of U.S. President Ulysses S. Grant

== March 12, 1977 (Saturday) ==
- The U.S. Senate released reports on human rights abuses in 82 world nations that were receiving military aid from the United States, three of which— Ethiopia, Argentina and Uruguay— had been cut off completely because of their rights record. The reports had been mandated by an amendment to the 1976 budget bill for American foreign aid.
- The Communist government of the Lao People's Democratic Republic arrested the nation's last King of Laos, Savang Vatthana and former Crown Prince Vong Savang, charging them and two other people of masterminding a rebel attack. Savang had been forced by the Pathet Lao to abdicate the throne on December 2, 1975. Savang Vatthana, Queen Khamphoui and Vong Savang were deported to a prison camp at Phong Saly province.
- Turkish journalist Taner Akçam, incarcerated in Ankara for sedition connected with his writings about Turkey's treatment of the Kurdish minority, escaped from Ankara Central Prison after digging a hole using the leg of an iron stove. He fled to West Germany and was granted citizenship and freedom to continue his political activities.
- Yeungjin University opened in South Korea at Daegu as Yeungin Technical School, becoming a college in 1985.

== March 13, 1977 (Sunday) ==
- The first "Wet 'n Wild "water park", an amusement park chain that only featured water attractions for swimmers, was opened in Orlando, Florida as an idea from George Millay, who had created the SeaWorld marine mammal theme park.
- The Sikorsky S-76, the first American-made helicopter developed specifically for civilian rather than military use, made its first flight.
- Born: Kay Tse, Hong Kong Cantopop singer; in Tai Po, Hong Kong
- Died: Jan Patočka, 69, Czech human rights activist, died of a cerebral hemorrhage 10 days after he had become ill while being interrogated for 12 hours by Czechoslovak security police over his involvement with the Charter 77 manifesto.

== March 14, 1977 (Monday) ==
- Sanjay Gandhi, the controversial son of India's Prime Minister Indira Gandhi and a candidate for the upcoming Lok Sabha elections, was unhurt after an assassination attempt against him in the impoverished district of Amethi in Uttar Pradesh.
- The second longest hijacking in world history, spanning over 8,388 miles (13,499 km), began when an Italian passenger on an Iberia Air Lines flight hijacked the Boeing 727 in Spain shortly after it took off from Barcelona on a short flight to the resort of Palma de Majorca. Luciano Porcari, who had managed to bring two rifles and a pistol on the flight, then ordered the crew to fly to Algiers for refueling, than to Abidjan in the Ivory Coast, where authorities met his demand to get his 3-year-old daughter and $140,000 ransom. From Abidjan, the plane flew back to Spain and landed in Seville, then flew to Italy where it landed in Turin, where a 6-year-old daughter lived. Porcari freed five adults and two children, but his wife refused his demand for the second child, and he ordered the flight to fly to Switzerland, where seven more hostages were freed in Zürich. Returning to Turin to try talking with his wife a second time, Porcari then sought to fly to the U.S.S.R. with his 22 hostages, but the exhausted crew refused to fly further after the 727 landed in Warsaw for refueling in Poland. After traveling a third time to Turin, the flight was diverted to Switzerland and landed in Zürich to get a new crew. Two Swiss policemen, posing as a pilot and co-pilot, overpowered Porcari and retook the airplane, 44 hours after it had departed Barcelona.
- Born:
  - Matthew Booth, South African footballer with 37 caps for the national team as its only white player from 1999 to 2010; in Fish Hoek, Western Cape
  - Kim Nam-il, South Korean footballer with 98 caps for the national team; in Incheon
  - Naoki Matsuda, Japanese footballer with 40 caps for the national team; in Kiryu, Gunma prefecture (died of cardiac arrest 2011)
- Died: Fannie Lou Hamer, 59, African-American civil rights activist known for coining the phrase "sick and tired of being sick and tired", died of complications from hypertension and breast cancer.

== March 15, 1977 (Tuesday) ==
- Dan Margalit, an investigative reporter covering the U.S. for the Israeli newspaper Haaretz, published the news story revealing the "Dollar Account affair" (Parashat Heshbon HaDolarim) that would bring down the government of Israeli Prime Minister Yitzhak Rabin.
- Soviet Russian dissident Anatoly Shcharansky was arrested by the KGB on charges of espionage and treason connected to passing along information to the West concerning 1,300 people whose knowledge of Soviet state secrets kept them from being allowed to emigrate. Shcharansky would be spared the death penalty, but sentenced to 13 years at hard labor at Lefortovo Prison. In 1986, he would be released as part of a prisoner exchange and emigrate to Israel, where he would change his name to Natan Sharansky. He would later become a politician and an Israeli cabinet-level minister.
- Soviet spy Sergei Fabiev was arrested as he was trying to leave France, where he had stolen the complete plans of the design of the Concorde aircraft. France's intelligence agency SDECE had decoded messages to Fabiev from Moscow that had congratulated him for obtaining the plans. Fabiev would be sentenced to 20 years in prison.
- The government of Spain announced rules for the nation's first multiparty election in more than 40 years, to take place on June 15. Voting for the Congress of Deputies and the Senate in the Cortes Generales would have at least three deputies for each of Spain's 50 provinces, with additional deputies for every 144,500 residents above 289,000, and no incumbent deputy could run without resigning his or her seat.
- The U.S. Senate voted, 66 to 26, to reinstate an embargo against importing chromium from the white-minority ruled African nation of Rhodesia, following a 250 to 146 vote the day before in the House of Representatives. The embargo had been suspended in 1971 because of the need in the U.S. for industry and national defense. President Carter signed the ban three days later.
- Lobbied by singer and orange juice spokesperson Anita Bryant, the County Commission of Dade County, Florida, voted 6 to 3 to authorize a special referendum on whether to reverse a county ordinance that had been enacted in January against discrimination based on sexual orientation. Bryant, who had formed the group "Save Our Children Inc.", presented a petition of 64,000 signatures to demand the repeal of the ordinance. The vote was scheduled for June 7.
- What is now in Yeonsung University in South Korea opened in the city of Anyang in Gyeonggi province, as the Anyang Industrial Technical School, becoming a technical college in 1979, and Anyang Science University in 2010 before adopting its present name in 2012.
- The U.S. Food and Drug Administration issued a detailed regulation, 21 CFR §164.110. requiring that packages sold as "mixed nuts" must contain at least four different varieties of tree nuts or peanuts and that those with three or fewer varieties could only be called "mixes". A further regulation in 1993 would provide that the container volume must be at least 85% filled.
- Born:
  - Brian Tee (stage name for Jae-Beom Takata), Japanese-born American TV actor known for portraying "Dr. Ethan Choi" on Chicago Med and its two spinoffs; in Okinawa
  - Marcos Peña, Chief of the Cabinet of Ministers of Argentina for President Mauricio Macri, 2015-2019; in Buenos Aires
- Died:
  - Antonino Rocca, 55, Italian-born and Argentine-raised U.S. professional wrestler and celebrity, died of a urinary tract infection.
  - Hubert Aquin, 47, Canadian novelist and screenwriter, shot himself to death.
  - Austin M. Purves Jr., 76, American artist and sculptor

== March 16, 1977 (Wednesday) ==
- Kamal Jumblatt, the leader of Lebanon's leftist Progressive Socialist Party, was shot to death along with his bodyguard and his chauffeur by assassins between the Christian village of Deir Dourit and the Druze Muslim town of Baakleen. Jumblatt was on a mountain road 14 miles (23 km) southeast of Beirut when he was ambushed by at least three men armed with Kalashnikov assault rifles.
- Voting began in India for the 542 seats of the lower house of parliament, the Lok Sabha.
- Organized crime leader Santo Trafficante Jr. appeared before the special United States House Select Committee on Assassinations, and repeatedly refused to answer any questions directed at whether he had advance knowledge of plans for the 1963 assassination of U.S. President John F. Kennedy. Trafficante repeatedly invoked his right under the Fifth Amendment of the U.S. Constitution to avoid self-incrimination.
- Hans-Joachim Bohlmann of West Germany, already under treatment for mental illness, began a campaign of vandalism of the nation's artworks, five days after his wife had died in an accident. Bohlmann defaced a statue in the city park of Hamburg, then moved on to destroying paintings in museums, lasting until shortly before his death in 2009.
- Died: Nina Demme, 74, Soviet Antarctic explorer and the first woman to lead a polar expedition

== March 17, 1977 (Thursday) ==
- At least 67 Lebanese Christian villagers were killed by Druze Muslims in villages in Lebanon's Chouf Mountains, the day after the assassination of Druze Muslim leader Kamal Jumblatt. A group of 20 people were killed in the village of Barouk.
- Congolese rebels, who had invaded Zaire's copper-rich Shaba province from Angola, seized control of the city of Kolwezi, a major center for copper mining. Shaba had formerly been the Katanga province that had attempted to secede from Zaire in the early 1960s.
- The first of the two Centenary Test test cricket matches between Australia and England ended after five days of competition at the Melbourne Cricket Ground. Australia won by 45 runs (557 to 512). The test match was staged in honour of the 1877 inaugural meeting between the teams.
- The Aircraft and Shipbuilding Industries Act 1977 was given royal assent in the United Kingdom, authorizing the government to nationalize the nation's aircraft industry (resulting in the creation of British Aerospace on April 29) and the shipping industry (with the creation of British Shipbuilders on September 1).
- Born:
  - Rana Raslan, Israeli Arab model and the only Arab Muslim to win Miss Israel beauty competition; in the Wadi Nisnas neighborhood of Haifa. Raslan won the 1999 pageant and represented Israel at the Miss Universe competition the same year.
  - Mamikhan Umarov, Chechen-born Austrian political activist murdered in Vienna after his regular criticism of Chechnya dictator Ramzan Kadyrov; in Argun, Checheno-Ingush ASSR, Russian SFSR, Soviet Union (killed 2020)
  - Marco Pérez, Mexican TV and film actor; in Mexico City
  - Naum Babaev, Russian Jewish agricultural entrepreneur who founded the Russian dairy company Rusmolco in 2007 and the Damaté Group of poultry farms in 2011; in Kislovodsk, Russian SFSR, Soviet Union
- Died:
  - Russell Patterson, 83, American illustrator and cartoonist
  - Arie Jan Haagen-Smit, 77, Dutch chemist known his campaign for air pollution control in the United States, died of lung cancer.

== March 18, 1977 (Friday) ==
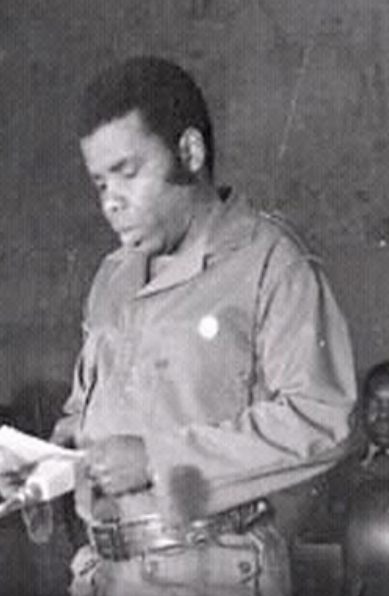
Ngouabi

- Marien Ngouabi, the President of the People's Republic of the Congo since 1969, was shot to death in his office at Brazzaville by an assassination squad led by Congo Army Captain Barthelemy Kikadidi. The 11-member Military Committee of Ngouabi's Parti congolais du travail, headed by Army Colonel Joachim Yhombi-Opango, administered the nation until April 3, when Yhombi-Opango became the new President of the Congo. Former President Alphonse Massamba-Debat admitted, in custody of the police, that he had organized the failed coup d'etat against Ngouabi He was executed on March 25.
- In Hanoi, the government of Vietnam met with a special commission sent by U.S. President Carter and released "12 black steel coffins" carrying the remains of 12 U.S. servicemen who had been killed in the Vietnam War. The five-member American group to take the bodies arranged for the coffins to be placed on a U.S. Air Force C-141 jet and then flew to Vientiane in Communist-ruled Laos to seek an accounting of servicemen missing in action.
- The most popular Pakistani film up to that time, the romantic drama Aina, was released nationwide. Directed by Nazar-ul-Islam, the Urdu language movie starred actress Jharna Basak, better known as Shabnam, and actor Nadeem Baig in the roles of Rita and Iqbal, respectively.
- The scheduled premiere in Munich of the Ulli Lommel film Adolf and Marlene was canceled after Marlene Dietrich threatened to file a lawsuit for defamation. Singer Dietrich, 75 years old at the time the suit was filed, had left Germany before Adolf Hitler came to power and was outraged by the film's premise that she had departed "to escape Hitler's unwanted attentions."
- Born:
  - Zdeno Chára, Slovak ice hockey player with 22 seasons and 1,680 games in the NHL between 1998 and 2022, and member of the Slovak national team; in Trenčín, Czechoslovakia
  - Arkady Babchenko, Russian journalist; in Moscow
  - Willy Sagnol, French footballer with 58 caps for the France national team, later manager for the Georgia national team; in Saint-Étienne, Loire département
- Died: Carlos Pace, 32, Brazilian race car driver, was killed in a plane crash during a storm, shortly after he and the pilot took off from São Paulo's Campo de Marte Airport in Mairiporã.

== March 19, 1977 (Saturday) ==
- An estimated 5,000 West German protesters against nuclear power, breaking away from a peaceful protest group in the state of Lower Saxony fought with 4,000 police near the city of Hamelin at Emmerthal, where construction of a power plant was underway on the Weser River. Over three hours, 20 police and an unknown number of demonstrators were injured after protesters knocked down fences and attempted an occupation.

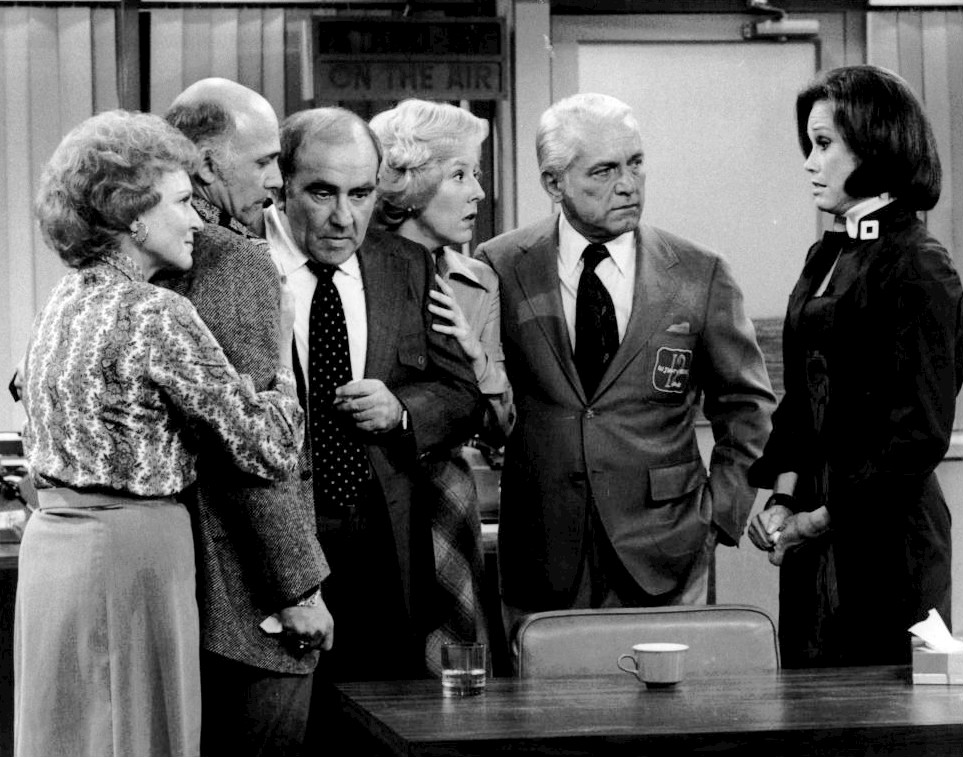
Betty White, Gavin MacLeod, Ed Asner, Georgia Engel, Ted Knight and Mary Tyler Moore in the final show

- The 168th and final episode was broadcast of the popular U.S. TV sitcom The Mary Tyler Moore Show (officially called Mary Tyler Moore), which completed seven seasons after making its debut on September 19, 1970.
- The U.S. Department of State declined to renew its prohibition against allowing U.S. citizens to travel to the Communist nation of Cuba. Prohibitions against spending U.S. dollars in Cuba were lifted shortly afterward. The ban against business and tourist travel would be reinstated on April 19, 1982.
- After receiving permission from the U.S. Army to explore mountains on the restricted White Sands Missile Range in the state of New Mexico, professional treasure hunter Norman Scott and his party of gold-seekers began 10 days of searching for "the Lost Treasure of Victorio Peak". The legend of the Lost Padre Mine dated back to the 1790s, when French Jesuit missionary Felipe La Rue reported a mine where gold was "stacked like cordwood". No gold was found in the 10-day search.
- Born: Robert Lindstedt, Swedish tennis player, 2014 Australian Open doubles winner; in Stockholm
- Died:
  - William L. Laurence, 89, Lithuanian-born American science writer for The New York Times, Pulitzer Prize winner, and the only journalist present at the first test of an atomic bomb, died at his home in Majorca in Spain. The Associated Press noted that "Laurence was invited by U.S. authorities to witness the Alamogordo test... because they believed he was the reporter best capable of explaining the bomb to the world."
  - Buck Shaw, 77, American college football player and college and pro football coach

== March 20, 1977 (Sunday) ==
- India's Prime Minister Indira Gandhi and her Congress Party lost control of the Lok Sabha in voting for 542 of the 544 seats in the Lok Sabha. The Congress Party, with a majority and 352 seats, lost 198 while Morarji Desai's Janata Party gained 260 for 295 seats. The prime minister herself, unpopular for her dictatorial rule since the June 26, 1975, proclamation of a state of emergency, lost her bid to be re-elected to the Lok Sabha by more than 35,000 votes, defeated in the Raebareli district by Socialist Party challenger Raj Narain.
- The explosion of the U.S. owned and Panamanian-registered oil tanker Claude Conway killed 12 crew off of the U.S. coast of Wilmington, North Carolina, in a blast apparently set off by welding torches. Within days, the ship broke apart with the stern section sinking first.
- Died:
  - Charles Lyttelton, 10th Viscount Cobham, 67, English-born Governor-General of New Zealand from 1957 to 1962, former star cricketer and British Expeditionary Force Commander during World War II
  - Max Stewart, 42, Australian racing driver, died of injuries sustained the day before in a crash at Melbourne's Calder Park Raceway.
  - Kenjiro Shoda, 75, Japanese mathematician and university administrator who was President of Osaka University from 1955 to 1961.

== March 21, 1977 (Monday) ==
- After having lost her seat in parliament in nationwide elections, and seeing the overwhelming defeat of her fellow Congress Party candidates, India's Prime Minister Indira Gandhi ended the state of emergency which she had implemented on June 25, 1975 to rule the nation. Mrs. Gandhi held an urgent meeting only hours after her loss was confirmed and the proclamation ending the emergency situation was signed by acting President B. D. Jatti just before dawn."
- The Soviet Union's de facto leader, Soviet Communist Party General Secretary Leonid Brezhnev, said in a nationally-televised speech that U.S. President Carter needed to halt his human rights campaign if Soviet-American relations were to improve. "Washington's claim to teach others how to live cannot be accepted by any sovereign state... I repeat again: We will not tolerate interference in our internal affairs by anyone under any pretext."
- AC/DC released their fourth studio album Let There Be Rock.
- The Khurgu earthquake struck southern Iran killing 152 people and injuring 556.
- Born: Mohammad Reza Golzar, popular Iranian singer and film actor; in Tehran
- Died: Kinuyo Tanaka, 67, Japanese actress and film director, died of a brain tumor.

== March 22, 1977 (Tuesday) ==
- The Qey Shibir (Red Terror) in Ethiopia escalated as Ethiopia's ruling military council, the Derg, ordered house-by-house searches within Addis Ababa and other major cities to look for members and suspected members of the rebel Ethiopian People's Revolutionary Party (EPRP). The searches were carried out by Derg-supported armed civilian groups who invaded homes and took the residents away on any evidence suggesting opposition to the government, including possession of a typewriter or a camera.
- The coalition government of Netherlands Prime Minister Joop den Uyl collapsed, prompting the calling of a new election to be held on May 25 for the 150=seat Tweede Kamer of the Staten-Generaal.
- Indira Gandhi resigned as Prime Minister of India after 11 years in office.
- James Earl Ray, the convicted assassin of Dr. Martin Luther King Jr., voluntarily met for two hours with two attorneys of the U.S. House Assassinations Committee, who came to the Brushy Mountain State Prison where Ray was serving a 99-year sentence. Ray was not under oath, but answered all questions from committee attorneys Richard A. Sprague and Robert Lehner.

== March 23, 1977 (Wednesday) ==
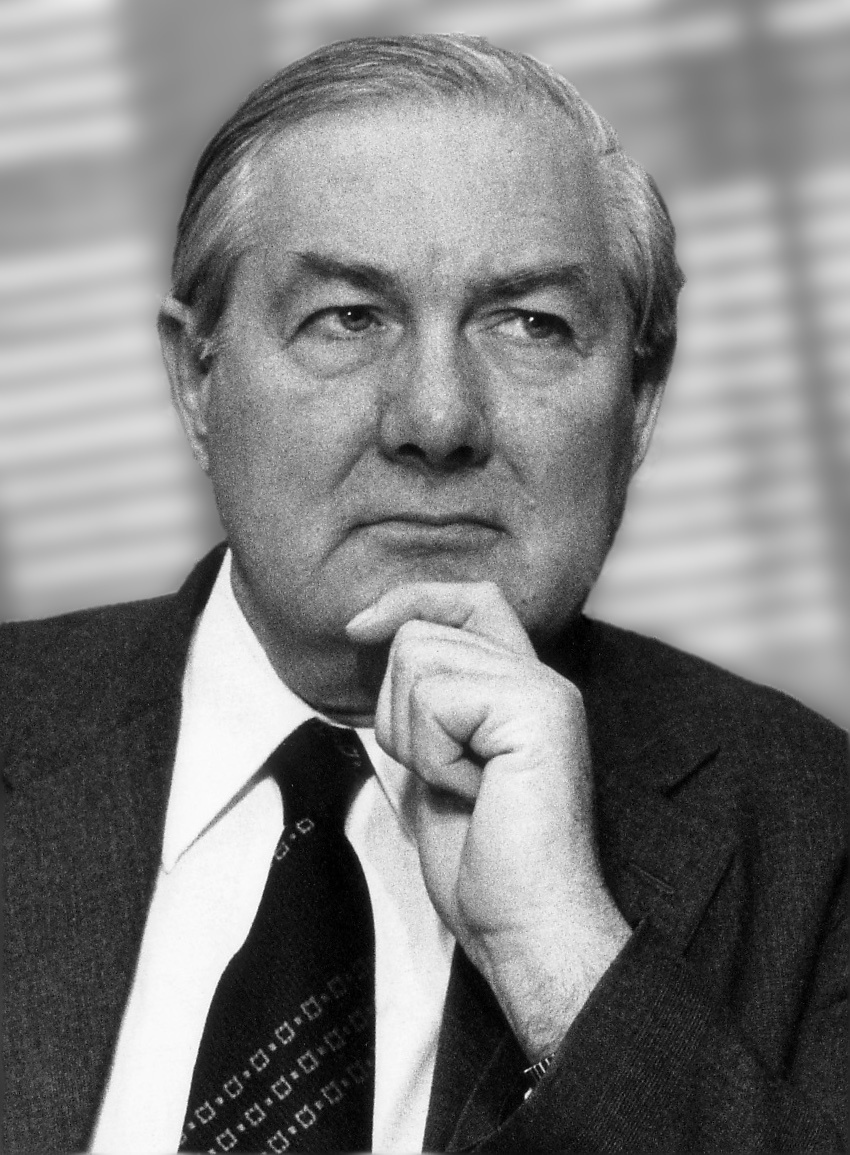
Callaghan

- The government of British Prime Minister James Callaghan and his Labour Party government survived a Conservative motion for a vote of no confidence, with 298 against him and 322 in favor.
- Former U.S. president Richard Nixon granted his first interviews since his 1974 resignation. With journalist David Frost conducting unlimited questioning, Nixon received payment of $600,000 and a 20% share of any profits. Nixon and Frost sat for 12 two-hour sessions on Wednesdays, Fridays and Mondays for four weeks at a seaside home in Monarch Beach, California. The edited sessions would be broadcast in four parts, starting on May 4, 1977.
- By a 5 to 4 decision in the case of Brewer v. Williams, the U.S. Supreme Court upheld the requirement of giving the Miranda Warning to all criminal suspects who have been placed under arrest and upheld the reversal of the murder conviction of Robert Anthony Williams, who had been found guilty of murdering a 10-year-old girl on Christmas Eve in 1968. The decision came after an appellate court concluded that the right to an attorney for Williams had been violated when police questioned him without his attorney present, and excluded all evidence from that had been presented following the location of the girl's body.
- Born:
  - Maxim Marinin, Russian figure skater and 2006 Olympic gold medalist and 2004 and 2005 world champion in pairs skating (with Tatiana Totmianina); in Volgograd, Russian SFSR, Soviet Union
  - Mehdi Safaei, Iranian kickboxer, karate athlete and bodybuilder; in Kermanshah
- Died:
  - Cardinal Emile Biayenda, 50, Roman Catholic Congolese cleric and Archbishop of Brazzaville, was kidnapped and murdered by three members of the family of the late President Marien Ngouabi.
  - Rosy Barsony (stage name for Roza Sonnenschein), 69, Hungarian-born stage and film dancer
  - Joe Stydahar, 65, American pro football coach and college football player, enshrined at the Pro Football Hall of Fame and the College Football Hall of Fame.

== March 24, 1977 (Thursday) ==
- At the age of 81, Morarji Desai, who had spent 19 months in prison during the emergency rule of Prime Minister Indira Gandhi, was sworn into office as the fourth Prime Minister of India after his Janata Party's overwhelming victory in the March 20 elections for the Lok Sabha.
- The BAFTA Awards were presented by the British Academy of Film and Television Arts, with One Flew Over the Cuckoo's Nest earning the awards for best film, best director (Miloš Forman), best lead actor (Jack Nicholson), best lead actress (Louise Fletcher), and best supporting actor (Brad Dourif).
- Born: Jessica Chastain, American film actress and winner of the 2022 Academy Award for Best Actress (for the title role in The Eyes of Tammy Faye); in Sacramento, California
- Died: Rodolfo Walsh, 50, Argentine investigative journalist and dissident against the South American nation's military dictatorship, died in a gunfight in Buenos Aires after a group of soldiers was attempting to arrest him.

== March 25, 1977 (Friday) ==
- Pakistan's Prime Minister Zulfiqar Ali Bhutto ordered the arrest of almost all leaders of opposition political parties in the Asian nation, and about 25 officials of the nine-party Pakistan National Alliance (PNA) were taken into custody in predawn raids. The imprisoned leaders would be held for almost two months.
- Fugitives Robert Roth and Phoebe Hirsch became the first members of the U.S. domestic terrorist group Weather Underground, to surrender to police. Both had been among 13 members who had been indicted in 1970.
- The final episode of the once-popular NBC TV situation comedy Sanford and Son was aired after six seasons and 136 episodes. Neither of the two stars of the show, Redd Foxx and Demond Wilson, were returning for a seventh season, with Foxx having signed a contract for a variety show on the ABC network, and producer Bud Yorkin refusing to agree to Wilson's demand to have his salary raised from $25,000 an episode to $35,000. As one critic noted after the final episode of the sixth season, The show attempted to continue with the supporting cast under the title Sanford Arms.
- Born: Édgar Ramírez, Venezuelan film and TV actor; in San Cristóbal, Táchira

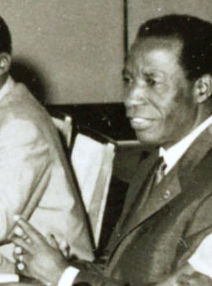
Former President Massamba-Débat

- Died: Alphonse Massamba-Débat, 56, who had served as the second President of the Republic of the Congo (from 1963 to 1968), was executed by a firing squad in a prison in Brazzaville after being convicted of organizing the successful assassination of President Marien Ngouabi on March 18.

== March 26, 1977 (Saturday) ==
- In Thailand, an attempted coup d'etat led by General Chalard Hiranyasiri, the deputy commander in chief of the Thai Army, failed within six hours, after troops loyal to Thailand's strongman, General Kriangsak Chamanan, surrounded the Army Tactical Operations Center where Hiranyasiri he had been commanding rebels. General Hiranyasiri would be executed on April 21, 1977, and several other coup participants would be sentenced to life in prison.
- A group of 18 dissidents in Poland formed the anti-Communist group ROPCiO (Ruch Obrony Praw Człowieka i Obywatela or Movement for Defence of Human and Civic Rights, led by Andrzej Czuma, issued a declaration similar to Czechoslovakia's Charter 77.
- The Delta State University Lady Statesmen of Cleveland, Mississippi won their third consecutive U.S. women's college basketball championship, defeating the LSU Lady Tigers of Louisiana State University, 68 to 55. The competition was hosted at the University of Minnesota.
- The long-running TV show Saturday Night Live changed to its current name in midseason, after having been called NBC's Saturday Night for its first 17 months.
- Born:
  - Bianca Kajlich, American TV actress; in Seattle
  - Anusheh Anadil, Bangladeshi singer and lead vocalist of the all-female folk-rock band Bangla; in Dhaka
- Died: Freda Bedi, 66, British-born Indian nationalist and the first woman from the West to be fully ordained in Tibetan Buddhism

== March 27, 1977 (Sunday) ==
An outline of the disaster

- The collision of two Boeing 747 airliners killed 583 people at the airport in Tenerife on the Canary Islands, with most of the passengers and crew on a KLM jet and a Pan American World Airways jet perishing. Pan American Flight 1736 was taxiing toward runway 12. At 5:06 in the afternoon, KLM Flight 4805's pilot mistakenly believed that he had been cleared for takeoff and accelerated into the slower moving Pan Am airplane. The KLM crew took off in an attempt to avoid hitting the Pan Am jet, but the bottom of the KLM fuselage struck the top of the Pan Am fuselage. All 248 people on the KLM jet died (234 passengers and 14 crew). On the Pan Am jet, there were 61 survivors, but 335 of the 396 people on board were killed. Most of the people on Pan Am 1736 had been on their way to Las Palmas to board a cruise ship, the Golden Odyssey, for a Mediterranean cruise. The Transport Ministry of Spain would conclude 19 months later that the KLM pilot, Jacob van Zanten, who had more than 25 years of experience, had caused the accident by ignoring a "stand by for takeoff" order from the control tower and taking off without clearance.
- Died: Diana Hyland (stage name for Diana Gentner), 41, American TV actress and one of the stars of Eight Is Enough, died of cancer 12 days after the show's premiere.

== March 28, 1977 (Monday) ==
- The Academy Awards were presented in Los Angeles on live television in the U.S. with Rocky winning for Best Picture (along with an Oscar for its director John G. Avildsen). The late Peter Finch was honored as Best Actor and Faye Dunaway as Best Actress, both for their performances in the film Network.
- The Marquette Warriors (of Milwaukee's Marquette University) won the NCAA basketball championship, defeating the North Carolina Tar Heels, 67 to 75, in Atlanta.
- Mexico and Spain restored diplomatic relations for the first time in almost 40 years, after having separated them in 1939 after Francisco Franco's victory in the Spanish Civil War.
- Architect Erno Rubik of Hungary received Hungarian patent No. 170,062 for his invention, a "spatial logic game" which would be marketed as the Bűvös Kocka (Magic Cube). Exclusive rights to the magic cube would be purchased by Ideal Toy Company in 1979 for marketing worldwide as "Rubik's Cube."
- Filming began at Pinewood Studios in Buckinghamshire, England, for Superman: The Movie.
- In England, ITV Yorkshire began an experiment of televising the UK's first morning TV news show, Good Morning Calendar. The show was the first in what is referred to in the UK as breakfast television.

== March 29, 1977 (Tuesday) ==
- The People's Assembly of Burma elected U Maung Maung as the Asian nation's new Prime Minister, after Premier U Sein Win resigned because of his government's inability to revive Burma's economy.
- Britain's Chancellor of the Exchequer, Denis Healey, announced a series of income tax cuts to boost the nation's sagging economy, but increased sales taxes on petrol, cigarettes and auto license fees.
- Died:
  - George de Mohrenschildt, 65, Russian-born American petroleum geologist and CIA informant who had befriended presidential assassin Lee Harvey Oswald and testified before the Warren Commission, shot himself to death hours after being interviewed by author Edward Jay Epstein, and after being approached after the interview by an investigator for the House Select Committee on Assassinations, a subcommittee of the U.S. Congress.
  - Charles Nicoletti, 60, American mobster and hitman for the late Sam Giancana, died the day after being shot three times in the head while sitting in his car outside of the Golden Horns Restaurant in suburban Northlake, Illinois, where he was waiting for his wife to arrive for dinner. Nicoletti, who was dying of leukemia, was scheduled to speak to the House Select Committee on Assassinations.
  - Eugen Wüster, 78, Austrian linguist and known for international standardization of scientific terms and as a specialist in the artificial Esperanto language

== March 30, 1977 (Wednesday) ==
- For the first time in more than 40 years, Spain granted workers the right to form their own trade unions. During the rule of Francisco Franco, government-operated trade unions mediated disputes between employees and manufacturers.
- Died: Abdel Halim Hafez, 47, popular Egyptian singer and film actor nicknamed "The Dark-Skinned Nightingale" ("'el-Andaleeb el-Asmar"), died from liver failure caused by 35 years of illness from the parasitic disease schistosomiasis.

== March 31, 1977 (Thursday) ==
- Hamaas Abdul Khaalis, who had been released on his own recognizance after the Hanfai Muslim seizure of 134 hostages in Washington D.C., as part of a deal, was sent to jail without bond after wiretap evidence revealed that he had threatened to kill 200 people.
- In the Philippines, a veteran airline pilot left the controls of a DC-3 that he had been flying from Zamboanga City to Bongao in the Sulu Island, picked up an M-16 automatic rifle, killed seven people (including a stewardess) and wounded 14 others before he was subdued. Ernesto Abuloc told investigators that he was aware that the chartered flight's manifest included a bank manager who was carrying $95,000 in cash, and that his intent was to rob all 38 people aboard. Copilot Rolando Suarez subdued Abuloc when the gun misfired and Abuloc was trying to insert another clip of ammunition.
- Police in Thailand arrested Tij Leka Mbret Shqptarvet, pretender to the throne of Albania as son of the late King Zog I, after finding a cache of assault rifles, rocket launchers and dynamite in his Bangkok hotel room. Booked on charges of illegal possession of deadly weapons, the 6'8" Albanian claimant, who told reporters "Call me King Leka I," and said that he lived in exile in Spain, said that he had started a guerrilla war to overthrow the Communist regime that had ruled Albania since the end of World War II. Leka explained "We are sending operational teams into Albania, on and off, in an out. I am the political head of the movement and, if you wish, the military commander. I am fighting to liberate my people. I'll continue to fight until we are free or I am dead. We are very stubborn people."
- The U.S. Senate Subcommittee on Internal Security was abolished. During the era of McCarthyism in the 1950s, the Subcommittee, counterpart to the House Un-American Activities Committee (HUAC), had investigated charges of Communist infiltration of the federal government. The HUAC and its successor, the House Internal Security Committee, had been abolished in 1975.
- The Shadow Box, written by Michael Cristofer and winner of the Tony Award for Best Play, made its debut on Broadway at the Morosco Theatre and ran for 315 performances.
