= April 1977 =

Month of 1977

<<	April 1977					>>
Su	Mo	Tu	We	Th	Fr	Sa
					1	2
3	4	5	6	7	8	9
10	11	12	13	14	15	16
17	18	19	20	21	22	23
24	25	26	27	28	29	30

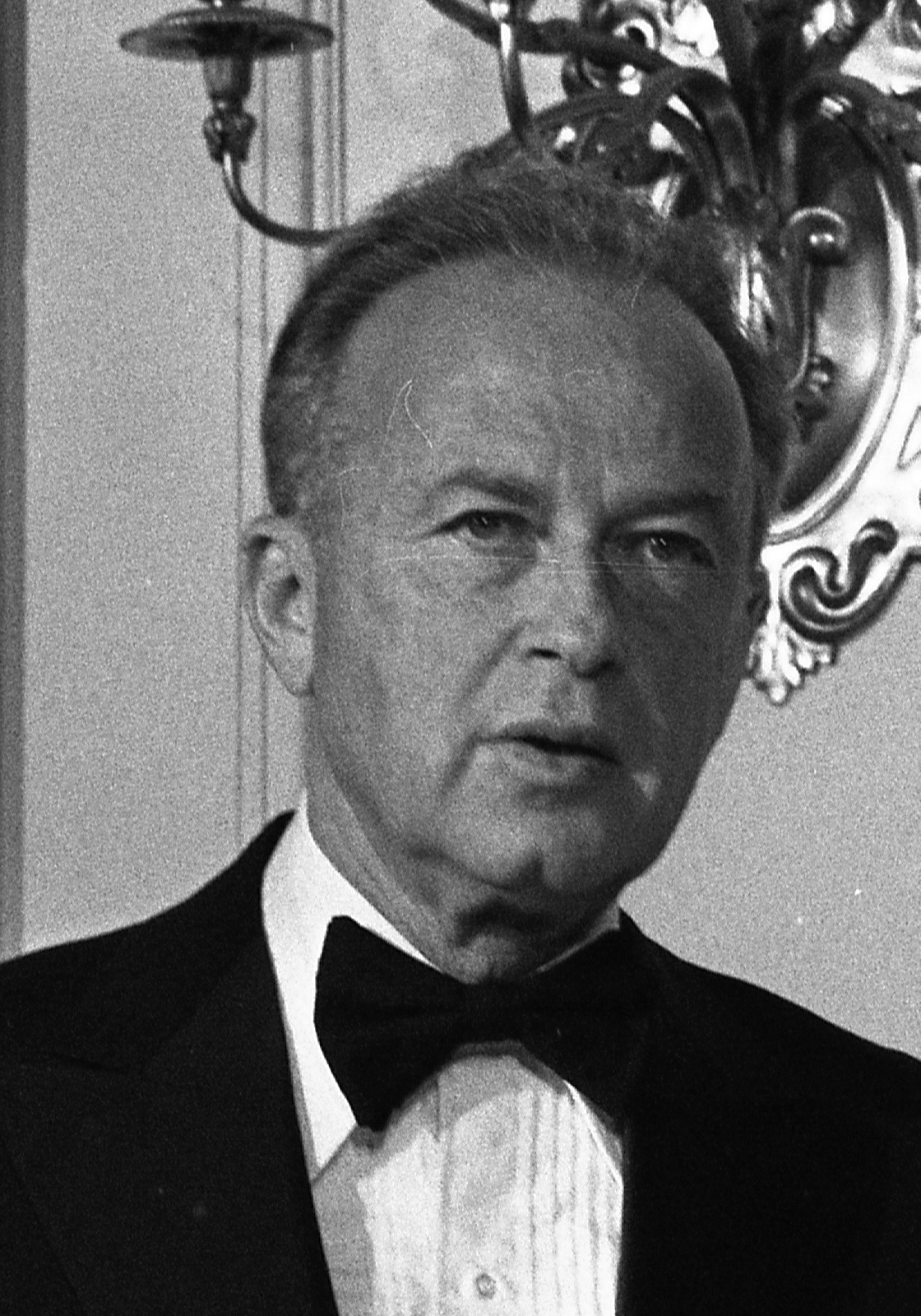
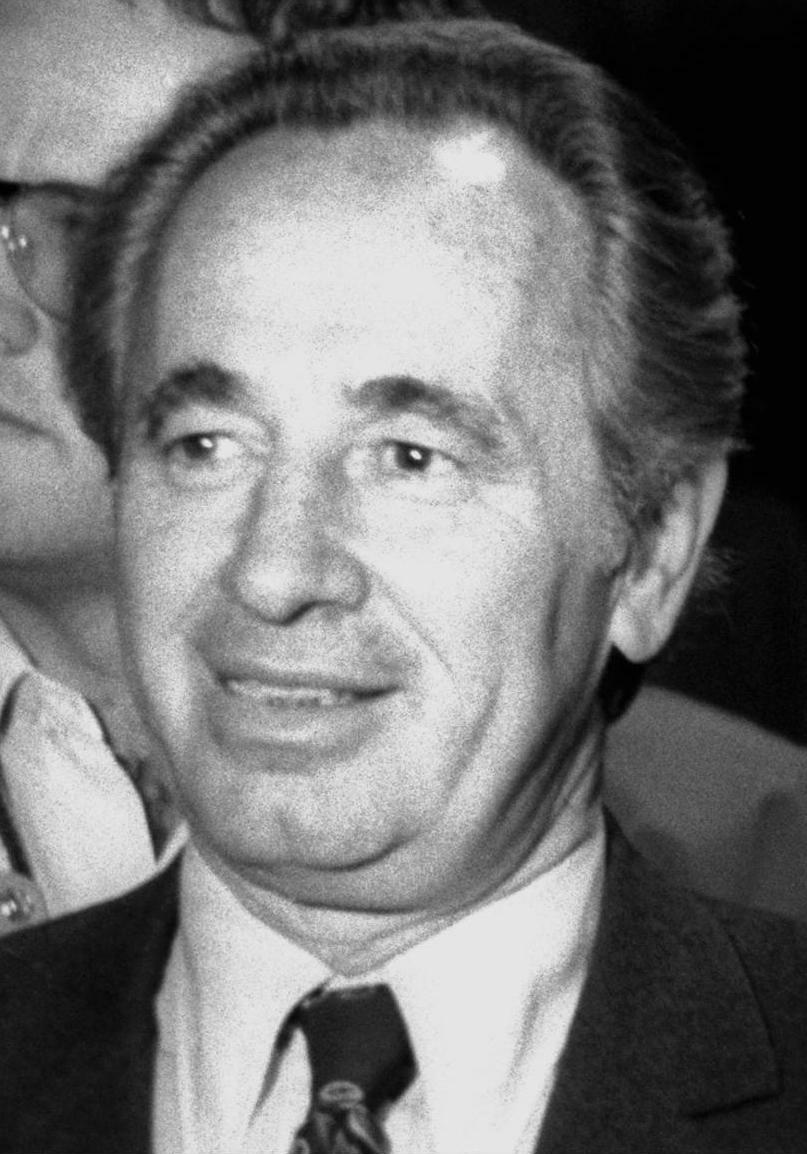
April 7, 1977: Israel's Prime Minister Rabin resigns during scandal, replaced April 22 by Shimon Peres

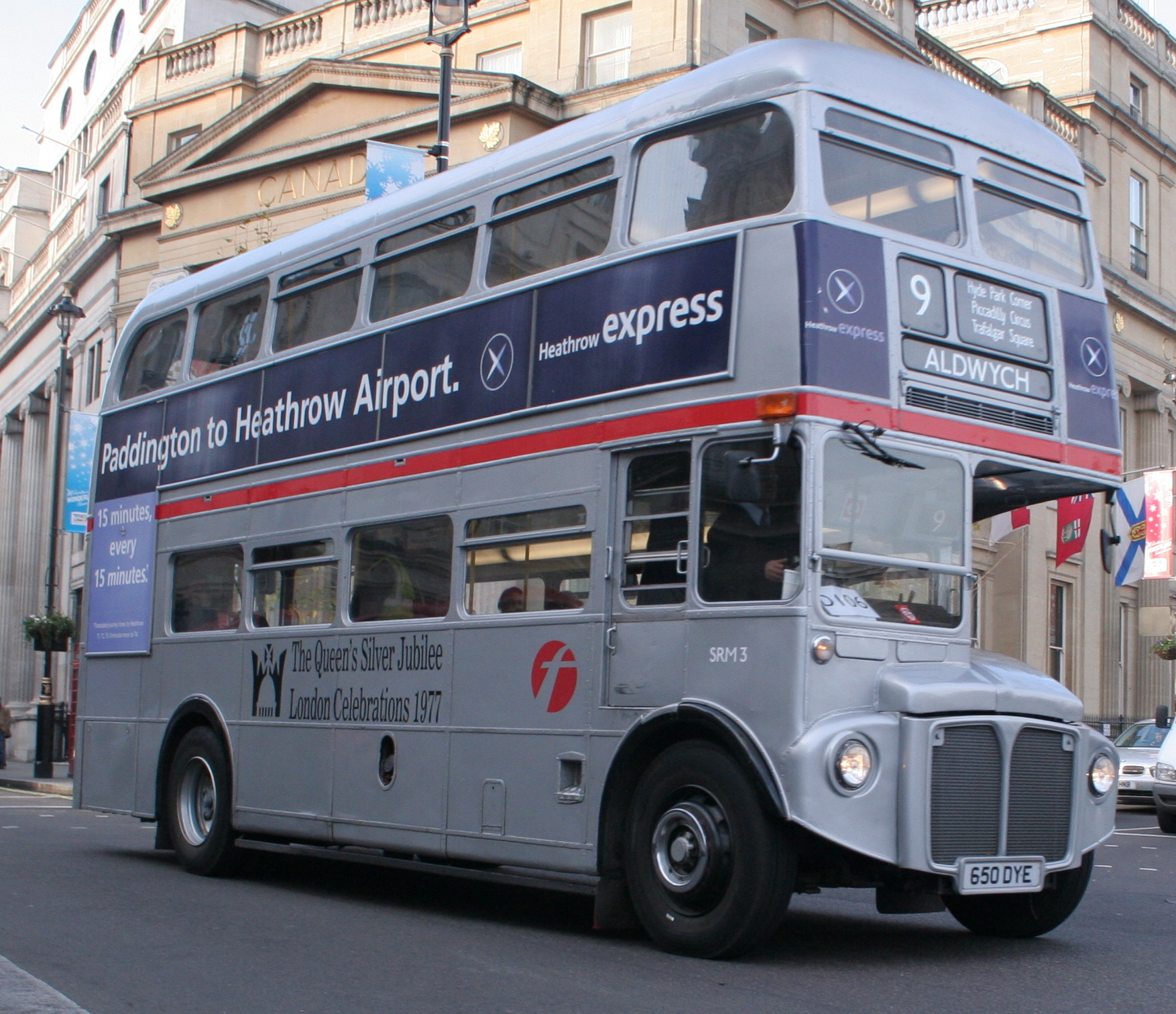
April 11, 1977: Queen's Silver Jubilee celebrated in London with silver-colored double-decker buses

The following events occurred in April 1977:

== April 1, 1977 (Friday) ==
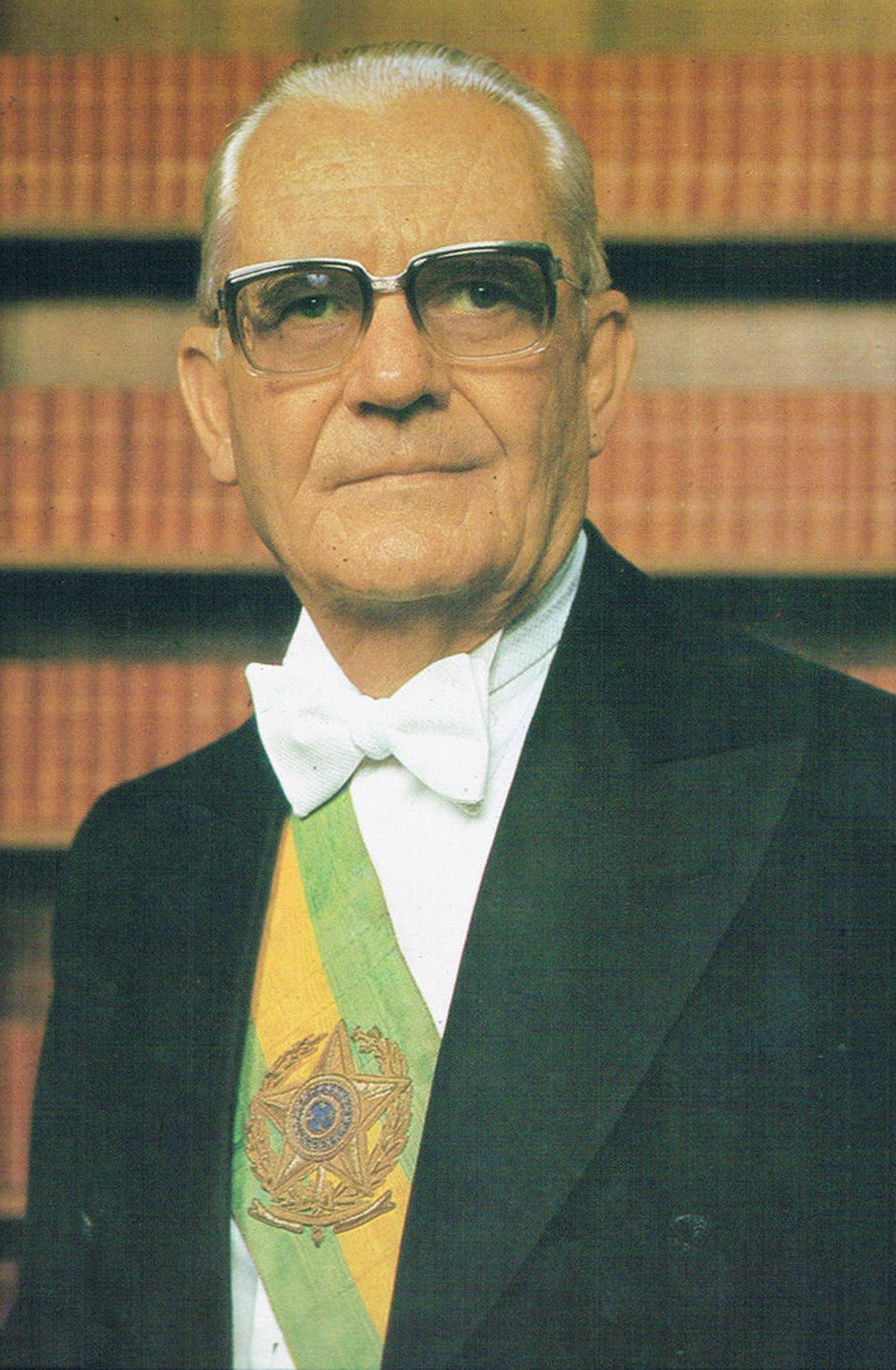
Brazilian President Geisel

- Brazil's President, Ernesto Geisel, announced in a nationally televised speech that he was shutting down the Brazilian Congress indefinitely, and that he would rule by decree until new political measures could be implemented. The move came after Geisel's proposed constitutional amendment for judicial reform failed to win a two-thirds majority.
- The United States Senate voted, 86 to 9, to adopt a Code of Ethics. For the first time, members were required to give full public disclosure of their income and their assets and liabilities.
- The white-minority ruled African nation of Rhodesia ended its ban against black Africans from whites only hotels, restaurants, bars and nightclubs.
- Born: Vitor Belfort, Brazilian mixed martial artist, winner of the 1997 "UFC 12" Ultimate Fighting Championship; in Rio de Janeiro

== April 2, 1977 (Saturday) ==
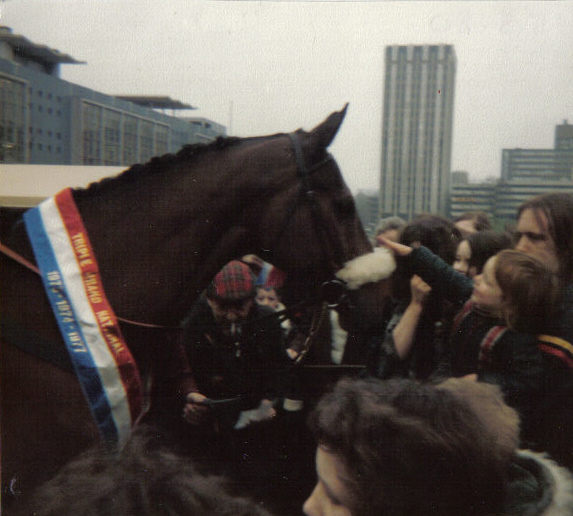
Red Rum in 1980

- Red Rum, described as "the 'wonder horse' of steeplechase racing" won a record third Grand National at Aintree Racecourse in the UK.
- General Joachim Yhombi-Opango became the new President of the People's Republic of the Congo after being designated by the ruling 11-man military council to succeed President Marien Ngouabi, who had been assassinated on March 18.
- Australia's top-level circuit for professional soccer football, the 14-team National Soccer League, played its first games, with franchises coast-to-coast in four states and the Australian Capital Territory. There were 2 teams in Adelaide, 2 in Brisbane, one in Canberra, 3 in Melbourne, and 5 in Sydney. The results of the two opening matches were West Adelaide SC 3, Canberra City FC 1 (at Canberra), and South Melbourne FC 2, Sydney Olympic FC 0 (at Sydney). John Kosmina of West Adelaide, a member of the Australian national team, scored the NSL's first goal.
- Born:
  - Nicki Pedersen, Danish motorcycle rider and World Championship winner in 2003, 2007 and 2008; in Odense
  - Michael Fassbender, German-born Irish film actor, known for 12 Years a Slave; in Heidelberg, West Germany

== April 3, 1977 (Sunday) ==
- A group of 22 Libyan Army officers were publicly hanged in Tripoli and in Benghazi after being sentenced to death for their attempt on August 13, 1975, to overthrow the government of Muammar Gaddafi and his ruling Revolutionary Command Council. Within two weeks, 49 people had been hanged.
- At Medeo in the Kazakh SSR (now Kazakhstan), speed skater Viktor Lyoskin of the Soviet Union broke the world record for fastest 10,000 meter race. His time of 14 minutes, 34.33 seconds would stand for almost three years until being bested in the 1980 Winter Olympics by Eric Heiden.
- Born: Chael Sonnen, American mixed martial artist, promoter and commentator, in Clackamas County, Oregon
- Died:
  - Pierre-Marie Théas, 82, French Roman Catholic bishop, recognized as one of the Righteous among the Nations for his efforts to protect Jews in France during the Nazi German occupation of France
  - Wilhelm Boger, 77, convicted Nazi German war criminal for his atrocities at the Auschwitz concentration camp, died at the Bietigheim-Bissingen prison in West Germany, 18 years after his 1959 arrest and subsequent sentencing to life imprisonment.

== April 4, 1977 (Monday) ==
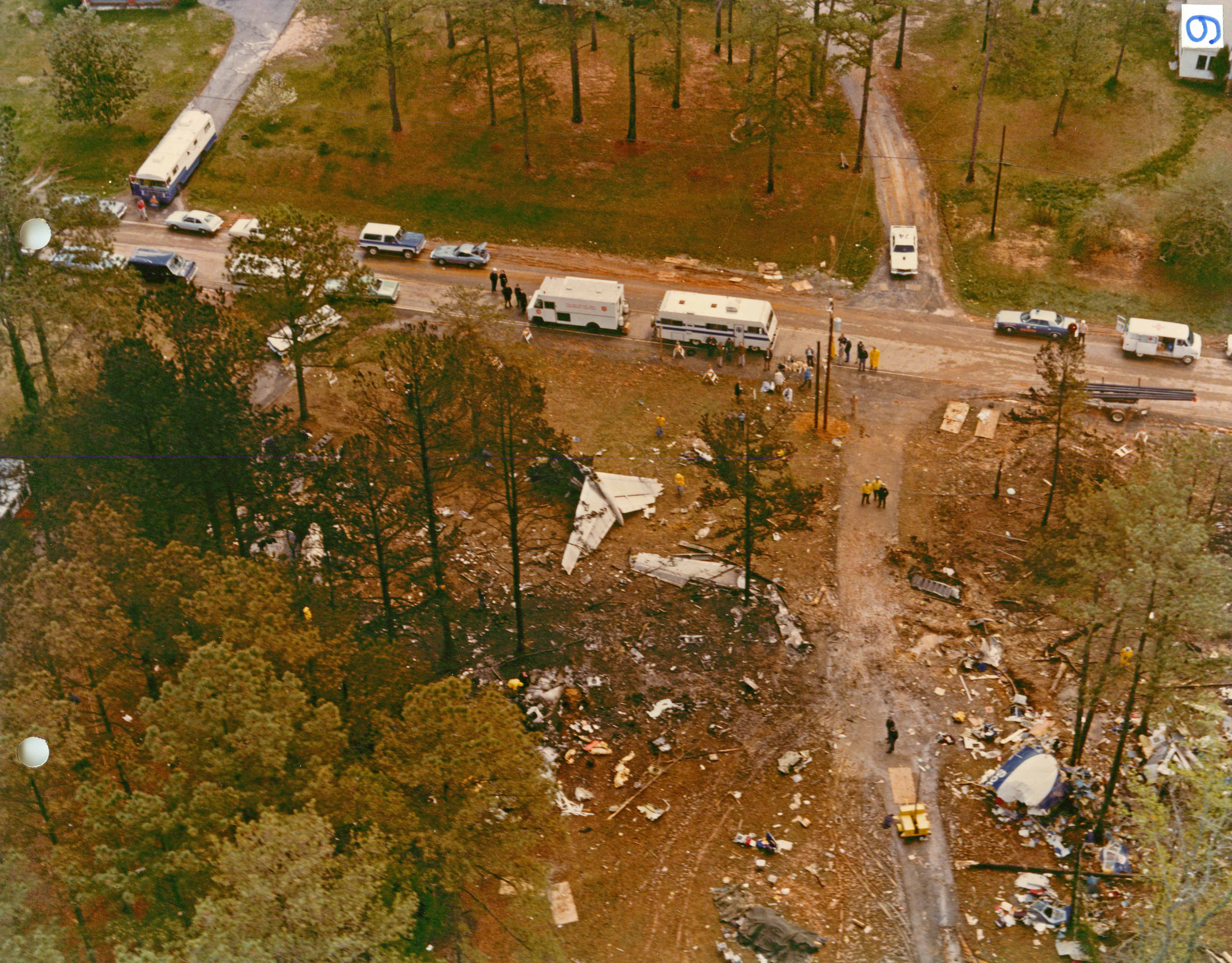
Flight 242 at Georgia Highway 92

- The crash of Southern Airways Flight 242 in the U.S. killed 63 of the 85 people on board, along with nine people on the ground, after the pilot attempted to make an emergency landing on Georgia State Highway 92. The twin-engine DC-9 jet was flying from Huntsville, Alabama to Atlanta and encountered hail and lightning that shut down both its engines before going down near the town of New Hope, Georgia. The pilot's last statement to the Atlanta control tower, made at 4:18 in the afternoon, was "We're putting it on a highway. We're down to nothing."
- Tornadoes killed 21 people in the U.S. state of Alabama, 17 in the Smithfield Homes housing project in western Birmingham. The same weather system brought heavy rains to the Appalachian regions of Kentucky, West Virginia and Virginia, creating massive floods that had mixed with unmelted snow in the mountainous area.
- In Spain, the Spanish Democratic Union (UDE) and the Christian Democratic People's Party (PPDC) merged to form the Partido Demócrata Cristiano (PDC) in advance of the June 15 parliamentary elections. The new party aligned itself with the Union of the Democratic Centre (Spain) (UDC) coalition of parties headed by Prime Minister Adolfo Suárez.
- Sweden's Prime Minister Thorbjorn Falldin announced that the nation's currency, the krona, was being devalued by 6%, and that the national sales tax was being raised from 18.65% to 21.65%. To combat the inflation from the devaluation, Falldin announced a price-freeze.
- In a non-binding referendum in the U.S. state of Massachusetts, residents of the islands of Nantucket and Martha's Vineyard voted overwhelmingly to secede from the state. The vote was reaction to a proposed revision of legislative districts of Massachusetts that would have deprived the islands of their own state representative, as part of reducing the number of state representatives from 240 to 160. State legislative approval would have been required to allow the islands to join another state.
- Henryk Górecki's Symphony No. 3 was given its first public performance, premiering at the Royan Festival in the French département of Charente-Maritime.

== April 5, 1977 (Tuesday) ==
- The 504 Sit-in protests in the U.S. were carried out simultaneously in 10 offices of the federal United States Department of Health, Education, and Welfare (HEW), after HEW Secretary Joseph Califano failed to sign off on regulations (authorized under §504 of the Rehabilitation Act of 1973 to provide disabled persons access to buildings and as well as to provide equal treatment under the law. The protests were successful in getting Califano to act on April 28.
- Following a meeting with U.S. President Jimmy Carter in Washington D.C., Egypt's President Anwar Sadat held a press conference at the Blair House, speaking mostly about the opening of a dialogue between the U.S. and Palestinian leaders about a state on the West Bank of the Jordan River. Sadat also indicated, in a statement that went unreported at the time, that he would be willing to make peace with Israel in the near future. An obscure "Israeli journalist", Wolf Blitzer, the Washington correspondent of the Jerusalem Post asked Sadat about an exchange of Egyptian and Israeli reporters, and Sadat replied "I, myself, have no objections to this. But, believe me, our people are not yet ready for this after 29 years of hatred, and four years, and bitterness.. We must take it gradually." Sadat would tell an American journalist, Mark Bruzonsky, that "the question stayed in his mind" after Blitzer had asked it, and explained that "from that suggestion grew the idea of offering to visit Jerusalem to accelerate the process toward a Middle East peace conference at Geneva," an event that would happen on November 19.
- The Grand National Assembly of Turkey voted, 342 to 1, to move the date for parliamentary elections from October to June 5.
- Twenty minutes after the departure of American Airlines Flight 241 from St. Louis to Los Angeles, the number 3 engine fell off of the Boeing 707 as the airplane was carrying 37 passengers and 7 crew. The crew of the American flight was able to guide the plane back to the airport for a safe landing. The engine was found the next day in a pasture 60 miles (97 km) west of the airport.
- Born:
  - Jonathan Erlich, Argentine-born Israeli tennis player, doubles winner in the 2008 Australian Open; in Buenos Aires
  - Daniel Majstorović, Swedish footballer and centre back with 50 caps for the Sweden national team; in Stockholm
  - Rupali Ganguly, Indian TV actress and Indian Television Academy Award winner as the star of Anupamaa; in Calcutta

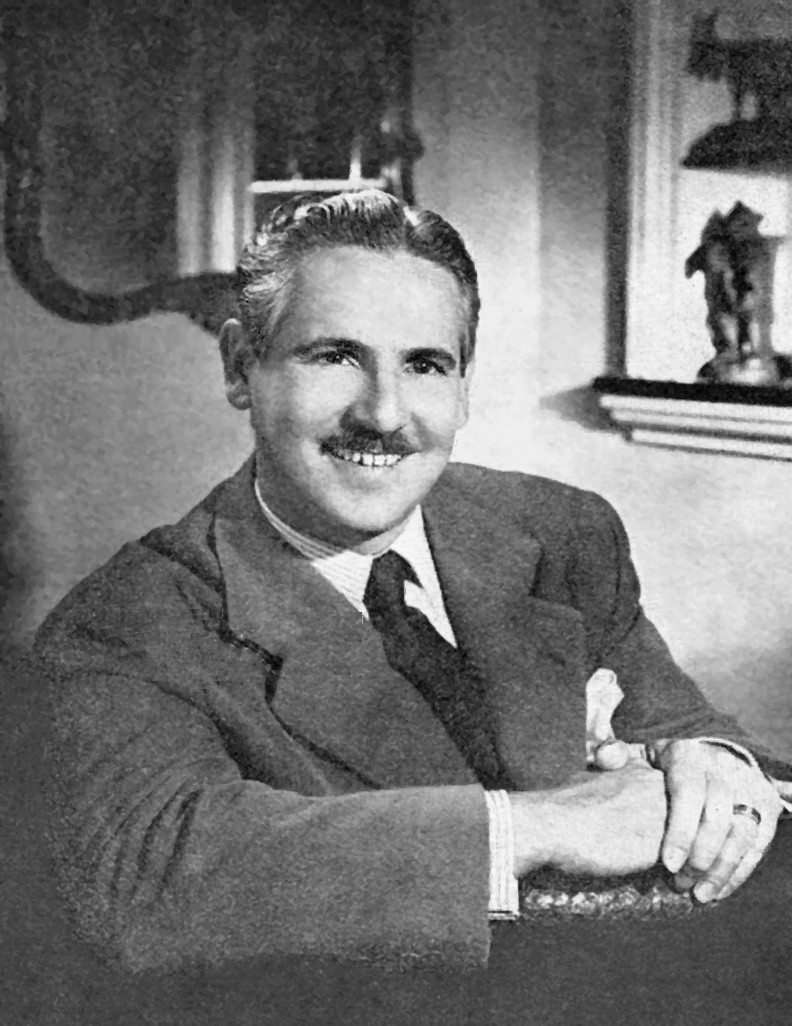
President Prío

- Died:
  - Carlos Prío Socarrás, 73, President of Cuba 1948 to 1952 until his overthrow by Fulgencio Batista, shot himself in the chest while living in U.S. exile at his home in Miami Beach.
  - A. P. Nagarajan, 49, Indian Tamil cinema film director, died of a heart attack.

== April 6, 1977 (Wednesday) ==
- A 6.5 magnitude earthquake struck southwestern Iran, killing at least 348 people and destroying 2,100 homes. Hardest hit was the town of Naghan, where 202 people died. The quake came 15 days after a 7.0 tremor on March 22, near Bandar Abbas, that killed 167 people.
- The white minority government of Rhodesia announced that it had started an operation to relocate 250,000 black African residents from rural tribal lands along the Honde River that marked its border with the neighboring nation of Mozambique, and that 17,000 had been placed them in "protected villages". Black nationalist leader Abel Muzorewa described the seven heavily guarded, fenced "villages" as "concentration camps", in that residents had to return to their villages for a curfew every night.
- U.S. President Jimmy Carter signed legislation that authorized him to reorganize the federal bureaucracy. During his election campaign, Carter had pledged to reduce the number of U.S. government agencies— 2,018 at the time— to no more than 200. Under the law, any proposal submitted to Congress would automatically take effect within 60 days unless either the U.S. Senate or U.S. House of Representatives voted against the change. On the same day, Carter asked Congress to authorize creation of a 2,019th federal agency, the "Agency for Consumer Advocacy".
- The new Seattle Mariners major league baseball team played their first game, losing 7 to 0 to the visiting California Angels at the Kingdome, before a sellout crowd of 57,762 spectators, the largest opening day attendance in MLB history up to that time. The event was also the first indoor baseball game in American League History.
- Merle "Hondo" Chance, an 8-year-old boy, became the 25th and last victim of American serial killer Patrick Wayne Kearney. Chance had last been seen riding his bicycle away from his home in Venice, California. His remains would be found on May 26 by a hiker in the Angeles National Forest.
- Died: Pat Evans, 21, American motorcycle racer, died in a hospital in Bologna, three days after suffering severe head injuries in an accident during a race at the Imola 200 race.

== April 7, 1977 (Thursday) ==
- Israel's Prime Minister Yitzhak Rabin announced his resignation in the wake of a scandal arising from a bank account that he and his wife had maintained in the United States, a violation of Israeli law prohibiting citizens from depositing hard currency outside of Israel with permission from the Finance Ministry. While Rabin was immune from prosecution as prime minister, his wife was not and he chose to quit so that they could face prosecution together, telling viewers "Morally and formally, I could not let her stand alone." Rabin waited until 20 minutes after Israel's victory over Italy in the European Basketball Cup finals to deliver a televised speech.

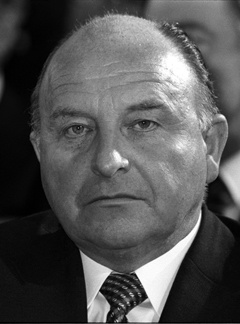
Siegfried Buback

- German Federal Prosecutor Siegfried Buback was assassinated by Red Army Faction terrorists, along with his chauffeur, Wolfgang Göbel, while his car was waiting at a red light near his home in Karlsruhe. A motorcycle pulled alongside his car, and a woman on the back of the cycle opened fire with a machine gun, then sped away. Buback was struck by more than a dozen bullets. Ulrike Meinhof, who had recently escaped from prison, claimed responsibility. Three members of her "Commando" group were arrested after the shooting.
- The eruption of the Mount Karthala volcano in the Comoros destroyed five villages in the African island nation, and killed a group of 80 people who were fishing off at sea when lava struck the water.
- Almost 900 people in Bangladesh were killed by a tornado, including those on 40 boats that were capsized in the Madhumati River.
- The European Champions Cup, a tournament for crowning the champion basketball team in Europe, was won in the Yugoslavian city of Belgrade, as Israeli champion Maccabi Tel Aviv defeated the defending Cup champion, Mobilgirgi Varese of Italy, by one point, 78 to 77. League champions from 21 European nations, as well as the national champions of Egypt and Israel, had competed for the title, sponsored by FIBA, the Fédération Internationale de Basket-ball Amateur.
- The new Toronto Blue Jays played their first Major League Baseball game, defeating the visiting Chicago White Sox, 9 to 5. The opener began after snow was plowed from the field.
- Died:
  - Karl Ritter, 88, Nazi German producer and director of propaganda films, died in Argentina, where he had emigrated after World War II.
  - David Hsin-fu Wand, 45, Chinese-born American professor, author and activist, was killed after plunging from the 11th floor of the Barbizon Plaza Hotel in New York City.

== April 8, 1977 (Friday) ==
- The English punk rock group The Clash, consisting of Joe Strummer (John Mellor) and Mick Jones on guitar and vocals, Paul Simonon on bass and Terry Chimes (billed as "Tory Crimes" and replaced by Topper Headon a week before the release) on drums, released its eponymously named debut album through CBS Records.
- Morocco became the first foreign nation to send troops to the central African nation of Zaire to support President Mobutu Sese Seko's government against the war by secessionists in the Shaba province. The first contingent of 1,500 Moroccan troops had been dispatched by Morocco's King Hassan II at the request of France.
- The U.S. Consumer Product Safety Commission (CPSC) banned the sale of all children's clothing that had been chemically treated with the flame-retardant (but carcinogenic) compound Tris (tris-hydroxymethyl-aminomethane). With 18 million garments to dispose of, the manufacturers exported the clothing to other nations where no ban was in place, until protests in the U.S. and abroad led the CPSC on May 6, 1978, to ban all sales of exported Tris products.
- Born: Mehran Ghassemi, Iranian journalist and expert on Iran's nuclear program and foreign policy; in Shiraz (died of a heart attack 2008)

== April 9, 1977 (Saturday) ==
- The government of Spain legalized the nation's Communist Party, the Partido Comunista de España (PCE), for the first time in 38 years. With the approval of Prime Minister Adolfo Suárez and his government, the Ministry of the Interior registered the PCE as the nation's 125th legal political party in advance of the June 15 parliamentary elections. Spain's dictator Francisco Franco had outlawed the PCE in 1939. Suarez acted after the Spanish Supreme Court declined to rule on the legality of the PCE and declared that the issue was political rather than judicial.
- Future U.S. President Donald Trump, a 30-year-old real estate entrepreneur in New York City, married Czechoslovak-born model Ivana Trump in a ceremony at the Marble Collegiate Church, in a ceremony officiated by church pastor Norman Vincent Peale, known for his 1952 bestseller The Power of Positive Thinking.

== April 10, 1977 (Sunday) ==
- In London, former North Yemen Prime Minister Kadhi Abdullah al-Hagri was shot to death by an assassin, along with his wife and North Yemen's ambassador to the UK. The three were in their car in front of the Royal Lancaster Hotel near Hyde Park.
- Hu Nim, Information Minister for the Communist Khmer Rouge government of Democratic Kampuchea, was arrested by the secret police after being implicated by another arrested official on charges of espionage for the American CIA and other "counter-revolutionary activity". Hu Nim, a member of the regime that carried out the Cambodian genocide, the mass murder and extermination of more than 1.5 million people, was sent to the S-21 security prison in Phnom Penh, and he would be killed on July 6, after enduring almost two months of torture.
- Following the resignation of Yitzhak Rabin as Prime Minister of Israel, the 815-member Central Committee of the ruling Israeli Labor Party chose Defense Minister Shimon Peres as its new leader. The only challenger to Peres, Foreign Minister Yigal Allon, had stepped aside as a candidate on April 9 in return for a promise that he would become a leading member of the cabinet if the Labor Party won the May 17 elections for the Knesset. Peres and the Labor Party would be defeated by Menachem Begin's Likud Party.
- The Japanese Super Cup was inaugurated as a matchup between the first-place finisher in the regular season of the Japan Soccer League and the winner of the Emperor's Cup tournament. In that Furukawa Electric SC of Chiba had finished first in the 1976 season (11 wins, 4 ties, 3 losses) and had won the Emperor's Cup as well (4 to 1 over Yanmar Diesel SC of Osaka, the Super Cup was a rematch between Furukawa and Yanmar, with Furukawa winning, 3 to 2.
- U.S. golfer Tom Watson won the Masters Tournament, finishing two strokes ahead of Jack Nicklaus, 276 to 278.
- Born: Lyudmila Filipova, Bulgarian novelist and journalist; in Sofia

== April 11, 1977 (Monday) ==
- In honor of the Silver Jubilee of Elizabeth II, London Transport introduced its repainted AEC Routemaster double-decker buses, changing from the traditional red to a silver color.
- A Los Angeles Superior Court commissioner ruled that it would be legal for Beverly Hills millionaire Sandra West to be buried dressed in her lace nightgown and sitting in her 1964 Ferrari automobile "with the seat slanted comfortably." Commissioner Franklin E. Dana ruled that the wishes of West, who had died on March 10, were "unusual, but not illegal." On May 19, West's instructions would be carried out at a cemetery in San Antonio, Texas, with the Ferrari and West's body loaded into a 20 feet (6.1 m) long crate and lowered into a 9 feet (2.7 m) deep grave, where two truckloads of concrete were then poured.
- Died:
  - Jacques Prévert, 77, French poet and screenwriter
  - Karen Krantzcke, 31, Australian tennis player, 1968 winner of the women's doubles championship at the Australian Open, died in the U.S., less than an hour after she and Kym Ruddell won the doubles final at the Lionel Cup tennis tournament in Tallahassee, Florida. Krantzcke, who was found to have an enlarged heart, had gone jogging on the grounds of the Forest Meadows Racket Club after the match, and was stricken 40 minutes her win.

== April 12, 1977 (Tuesday) ==
- South Africa's white-minority government rejected recommendations to admit persons of mixed-race ("coloured" under South African race classifications) into the nation's parliament, the House of Assembly. The Minister of Coloured Relations, Hennie Smit, said also that the cabinet of ministers had rejected an elimination of bans against interracial marriage and against sex between whites and non-whites.
- As the second anniversary of the fall of Saigon approached in the reunified Communist Socialist Republic of Vietnam, the government-run Vietnam News Agency announced that six million urban residents of the former South Vietnam would be forcibly relocated to the surrounding countryside. Commentator Nguyen Khac Vien said that 80 percent of the residents of Ho Chi Minh City, the former Saigon, "provide no useful work" for the socialist state and that they would be made to "work with their hands to help complete the Communist revolution."
- U.S. President Jimmy Carter commuted the 20-year prison term of Watergate scandal conspirator G. Gordon Liddy, reducing the sentence to eight years "in the interest of equity and fairness based on a comparison of Mr. Liddy's sentence with those of all others convicted in Watergate related prosecutions." While Liddy still was required to pay $40,000 in fines, the commutation made him eligible for parole later in the year and he would be released on September 7.
- Six weeks before the debut of the film Star Wars, Marvel Comics Group published the first issue of a comic book of the same name with the tag line, "Marvel's Epic Official Adaptation of the Mounumental 20th Century Fox Movie!". Although George Lucas authorized the publication (on November 12, 1976) of a paperback book that introduced the characters, the comic book was the first to provide a preview to fans of what the film would look like.
- A royal wedding was held in the Hashemite Kingdom of Jordan, with ceremonies at the Raghadan Palace in Amman. At the age of 21, Princess Alia bint Hussein, the eldest child of King Hussein, married Jordanian Army Lieutenant-Colonel Nasser Wasfi Mirza.
- Died: Philip K. Wrigley, 82, owner of the Chicago Cubs baseball team and president of the Wm. Wrigley Jr. Company chewing gum enterprise, founder of the short-lived All-American Girls Professional Baseball League.

== April 13, 1977 (Wednesday) ==
- Aston Villa won the Football League Cup, England's premier professional soccer football tournament, in the longest contest— 330 minutes— in The Football League's history, a 3–2 victory over Everton in the third meeting of the teams. The match on March 12 at Wembley Stadium had ended in a 0–0 draw. A replay on March 16 at Hillsborough Stadium in Sheffield finished after extra time as a 1–1 draw. The second replay, at Old Trafford in Manchester, was tied at 2–2 after 90 minutes. In extra time, Brian Little of Aston Villa made the go-ahead goal with less than a minute left in extra time of the third match. As writer Patrick Barclay of The Guardian wrote, "The longest cup final in English football history was decided in the 329th of its 330 minutes," adding that "If the first contest at Wembley had been a bore, the second at Hillsborough a slugging match, last night's affair at Old Trafford was a deluge of thrills from the moment Latchford put Everton ahead in the 38th minute."

== April 14, 1977 (Thursday) ==
- Spain's Communist Party, the Partido Comunista de España (PCE) held the first open meeting of its Central Committee in almost 40 years, celebrating its legalization by the Spanish government. Party Secretary General Santiago Carrillo convened the meeting in a banquet hall in Madrid.
- Born:
  - Sarah Michelle Gellar, American TV and film actress known for the title role in Buffy the Vampire Slayer; on Long Island in New York
  - Rob McElhenney, American TV actor and producer, known for It's Always Sunny in Philadelphia; in Philadelphia

== April 15, 1977 (Friday) ==
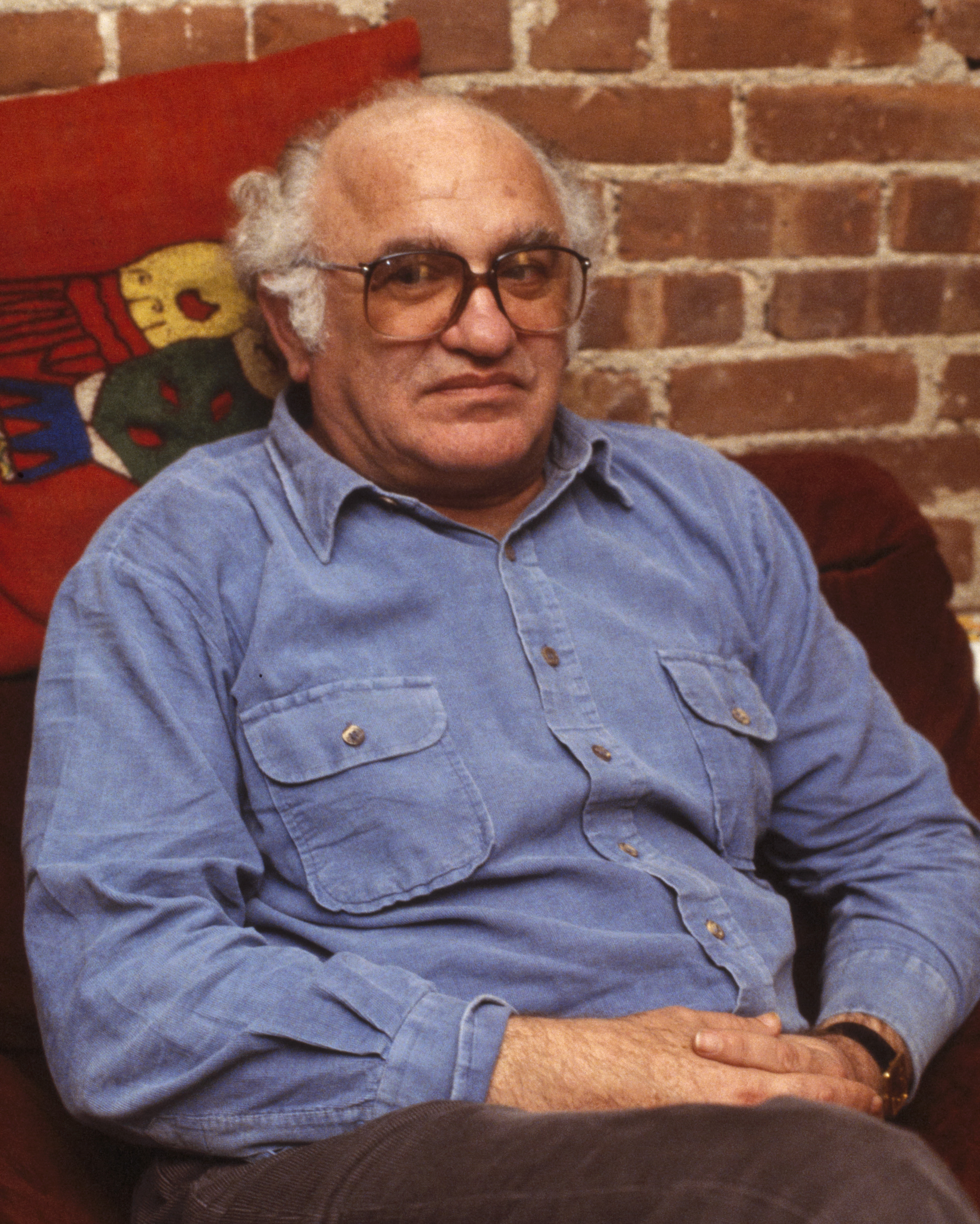
Timerman, the Prisoner Without a Name

- Argentine journalist Jacobo Timerman, editor of the leftist Buenos Aires daily La Opinión, was arrested along with assistant editor Enrique Jara on accusations of being associated with banker David Graiver. Imprisoned and tortured for one year before being transferred to house arrest, Timerman would be released on September 25, 1979, and would be deported to Israel. He would later recount his experience in his 1981 memoir Prisoner Without a Name, Cell Without a Number (Preso Sin Nombre, Celda Sin Numero).
- Born: Dejan Milojevic, Serbian basketball player and coach; in Belgrade, Yugoslavia
- Died: Alexa Stirling, 79, American-born Canadian golfer, winner of the U.S. Women's Amateur Golf Championship in 1916, 1919 and 1920

== April 16, 1977 (Saturday) ==
- The government of Spain announced that elections for all 350 seats of its Chamber of Deputies and all 207 of its Senate would be held on June 15, 1977, for the first free parliamentary voting in 41 years.
- Born: Freddie Ljungberg, Swedish footballer and winger with 75 caps for the Sweden national team; in Vittsjö

== April 17, 1977 (Sunday) ==
- Voting took place in a referendum in the Philippines in 13 provinces on the islands of Mindanao and Palawan where Muslim rebels had demanded autonomy. The Moro National Liberation Front boycotted the referendum. Autonomy was favored in the Western Mindanao region, which included the Zamboanga peninsula and the islands of the Sulu Archipelago, including Basilan and the Central Mindanao region on Mindanao island. Though a union of the two areas into one self-governing territory was rejected, the area is now the Bangsamoro Autonomous Region.
- Elections were held in Belgium for all 212 seats of the Chamber of Representatives (Kamer van Volksvertegenwoordigers/Chambre des représentants), and all 106 seats of the Belgian Senate (Senaat/Sénat). Prime Minister Leo Tindemans and his Christian Social Party (CVP) formed a coalition with the two wings of the Belgian Socialist Party (BSP and PSB) for a majority government of 117 seats in the Chamber and 59 in the Senate.
- An avalanche in the Fagaras Mountains of Romania killed 23 people in a high school group that had been near Bâlea Lake on a skiing trip. The dead were 19 students and four teachers. The state-controlled Agerpres news agency in the Communist nation reported the deaths six days later.
- A group of 11,000 protesters clashed with police in Japan at the opening of the new Narita International Airport at Narita, a suburb of Tokyo. Police said that 24 officers and "an undetermined number of students" had been injured.
- Born: Frederik Magle, Danish composer, concert organist, and pianist; in Stubbekøbing
- Died:
  - William Conway, 64, Irish Roman Catholic Cardinal, Primacy of Ireland since 1964 as Archbishop of Armagh, died of cancer.
  - Sir Peter Kirk, 48, British Conservative MP who was also the first Leader of the Conservatives in the European Parliament, having taken office on January 1, 1973. Kirk, who had suffered his first heart attack less than a year earlier, died of cardiac arrest at his home in Steeple Bumpstead, Essex.

== April 18, 1977 (Monday) ==
- Ian Smith, the Prime Minister of Rhodesia and its white-minority government, won approval for negotiating for eventual black-majority rule, after convening an emergency meeting of his Rhodesian Front Party. The delegates of the party (which held all 50 elected seats in the nation's Parliament) approved the resolution "that transition to black rule is inevitable" by a margin of 422 to 35, but that urged Smith to seek guarantees for "an equitable sharing of political power by whites."
- U.S. President Jimmy Carter delivered what would later be called the "Moral Equivalent of War speech, speaking on national television about his 10-point plan to fight the energy crisis in the U.S. by reducing American dependence on imported oil by 1985. Carter told viewers, "Two days from now, I will present to the Congress my energy proposals," adding that "many of these proposals will be unpopular," and "some will cause you to put up with inconveniences and to make sacrifices." Borrowing a phrase coined by William James, Carter said "This difficult effort will be the 'moral equivalent of war,' except that we will be uniting our efforts to build and not to destroy." A cynical press quickly dubbed Carter's "moral equivalent of war" as "M.E.O.W."
- An annular solar eclipse was visible in Africa.
- Born: Ilya Kaminsky, Soviet Ukrainian-born poet who later immigrated to the U.S.; in Odesa, Ukrainian SSR, Soviet Union

== April 19, 1977 (Tuesday) ==
- Leftist guerrillas kidnapped Mauricio Borgonovo, the foreign minister of the Central American nation of El Salvador, and demanded the immediate release of 37 political prisoners as ransom. The Salvadoran government refused to negotiate with the Fuerzas Popular de Liberacion (FPL) and Borognovo would be found dead in the town of Santa Tecla on May 11, 1977.
- A fire killed 23 people and injured 13 others at the five-story tall Central Hotel in Galveston, Texas, located in a run down section of town.
- The Congresswoman's Caucus, now the Congressional Caucus for Women's Issues, was founded by the 15 U.S. Representatives who were women. The members were 10 Democrats — Yvonne Brathwaite Burke (CA), Pat Schroeder (CO), Martha Keys (KS), Lindy Boggs (LA), Gladys Spellman (MD), Helen Stevenson Meyner (NJ), Shirley Chisholm (NY), Elizabeth Holtzman (NY), Marilyn Lloyd (TN) and Barbara Jordan (TX)— and five Republicans, Shirley Neil Pettis (CA), Marjorie Holt (MD), Margaret Heckler (MA), Virginia D. Smith (NE), Millicent Fenwick (NJ). At the time, there were no women U.S. Senators. Holtzman and Heckler served as the co-chairs.
- In a transfer supervised by the United Nations, Israel released the last of 48 Egyptian prisoners in return for Egypt's return of 11 bodies of Israeli citizens who had died in Egypt. Nine of the remains were of Israeli soldiers killed in the 1973 Yom Kippur War, while the other two bodies were those of Moshe Marzouk and Shmuel Azar, spies who had been executed in Egypt in the 1955 (Lavon Affair).
- Born: Darren "Whackhead" Simpson, South African radio host and prankster; in Durban

== April 20, 1977 (Wednesday) ==
- Ethiopia's military government, the Derg, began an 11-day campaign to prevent the Eritrean People's Revolutionary Party from disrupting the government's May Day festivities. Ethiopian military and paramilitary units killed more than 1,000 college and secondary school students, including the indiscriminate massacre of entire classrooms in order to set an example.
- Guerrillas of the South-West Africa People's Organization (SWAPO), a group fighting for black rule in the South African administered territory of South-West Africa (now Namibia) kidnapped 126 black children and four white staff members of a Roman Catholic mission school in the village of Onamulenga, then moved them across the border into Angola. Ten of the children were able to escape.
- The film Annie Hall, which would win the Academy Award for Best Picture as well as Oscars for Best Director for Woody Allen and Best Actress for Diane Keaton, was released nationwide in the U.S. after a screening at the Los Angeles Film Festival on March 27.
- Died:
  - Wilmer Allison, 72, American tennis player; U.S. Open champion in 1935 and Wimbledon finalist 1930
  - Bryan Foy, 80, American film producer and director known for the Warner Bros B pictures, including the 1953 3D classic House of Wax

== April 21, 1977 (Thursday) ==
- A. M. Sayem, the President of Bangladesh, resigned because of illness and was replaced by General Ziaur Rahman, who had been the nation's dictator as Chief Martial Law Administrator since 1975.
- Pakistan's Prime Minister Zulfiqar Ali Bhutto declared martial law in the three cities in the nation that had made the most urgent demands for his resignation, Karachi, Hyderabad and Lahore. The declaration was followed the next day by even more violence as protests began in other cities, and troops in Karachi fired on a crowd of anti-government protesters who defied an order to halt, killing at least 13.

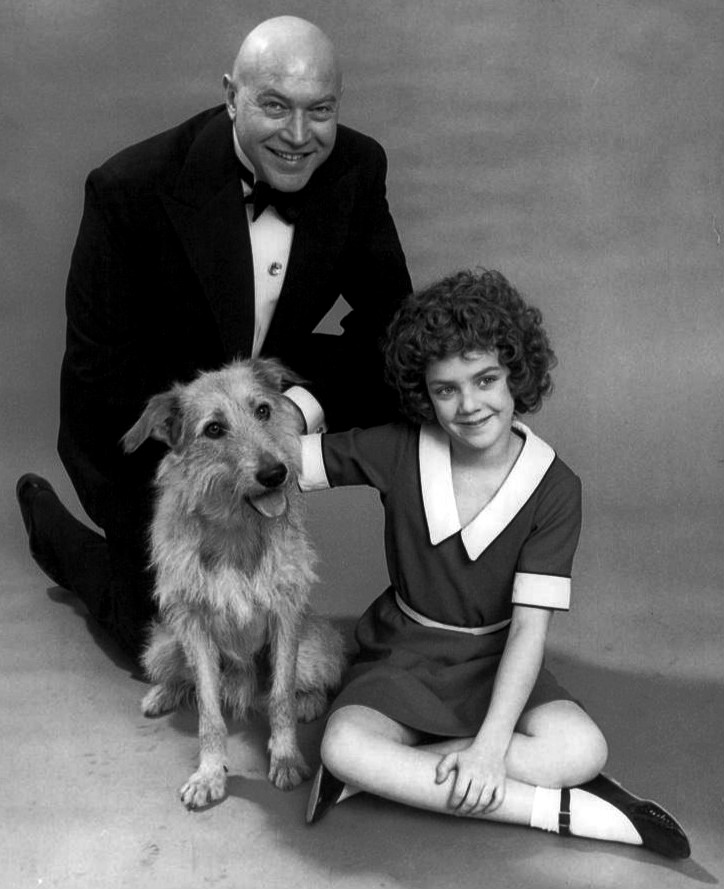
Andrea McCardle as "Annie", with Reid Shelton as "Daddy Warbucks"

- The popular musical Annie, based on the comic strip "Little Orphan Annie", made its debut on Broadway, premiering at the Alvin Theatre, and would go on to win three Tony Awards. With music by Charles Strouse and lyrics by Martin Charnin, Annie had been given a pre-Broadway performance starting on August 10, 1976, at the Goodspeed Opera House in East Haddam, Connecticut.
- Born: Jamie Salé, Canadian figure skater and 2002 Olympic gold medalist (with David Pelletier) in pairs skating; in Calgary
- Died:
  - Gummo Marx (stage name for Milton Marx), 84, American actor and comedian; he was replaced by Zeppo Marx after being drafted into the U.S. Army in World War One, and never appeared in the Marx Brothers' films, becoming instead a talent agent.
  - General Chalard Hiranyasiri, 53, a Thai Army officer who had attempted a coup d'état against Thailand's military government on March 26, was executed after a group of military and civilian leaders found him guilty of treason in a court-martial. The death penalty was invoked because General Chalard had personally shot and killed Major General Aroon Thavatasin, commander of the Thai Army First Division. After the sentence was pronounced, a reporter at the time noted, "The general was killed by machine gun fire three hours later."

== April 22, 1977 (Friday) ==
- Shimon Peres quietly took over the duties of Prime Minister of Israel, although Yitzhak Rabin was forced to remain as the nominal prime minister because of an Israeli law that barred a cabinet minister from resigning from a caretaker government.
- A funeral was held for U.S. outlaw Elmer McCurdy at Guthrie, Oklahoma, more than 66 years after he had been shot by a county sheriff's posse in 1911. McCurdy's body had not been buried at the time, and was displayed for decades at carnivals and at wax museums over the decades that followed until 1976, when a propmaster at a TV studio realized that the "mannequin" had been a human being. McCurdy's coffin was interred at the "Boot Hill" section of Guthrie's Summit View Cemetery.

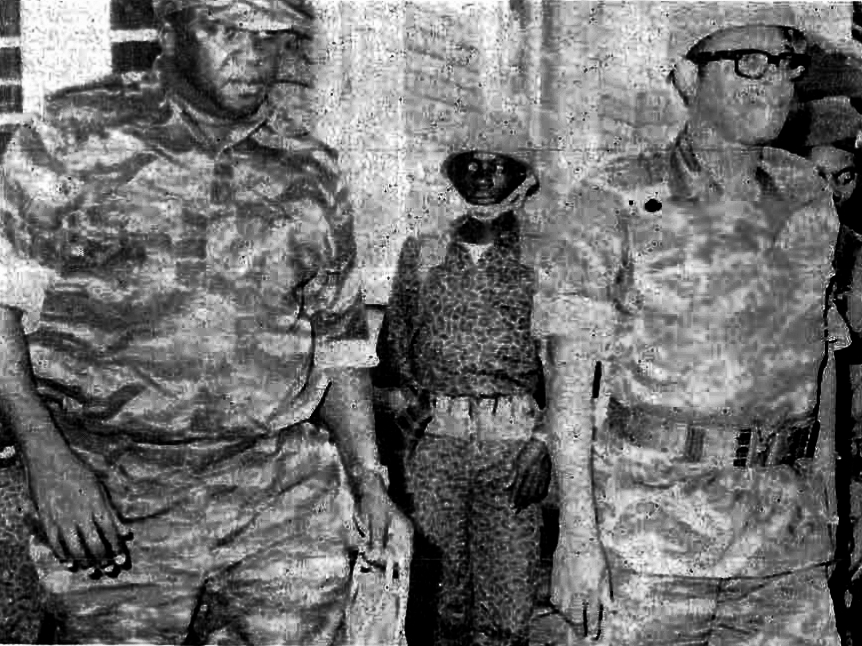
Idi Amin Dada and Mobutu Sese Seko

- Ugandan President Idi Amin visited Zaire and met with Zairean President Mobutu Sese Seko to discuss the Shaba I conflict. Amin agreed to provide aid against the rebels in the Katanga Province.
- Born:
  - Mark van Bommel, Dutch football player and defensive midfielder with 79 caps for the Netherlands national team; in Maasbracht
  - Steven Price, British film composer, Academy Award for Best Original Score winner for the 2013 film Gravity; in Nottingham, Nottinghamshire

== April 23, 1977 (Saturday) ==
- The "Battle of the Z Boys" was fought between bantamweight boxers Carlos Zarate (champion of the World Boxing Council) and Alfonso Zamora (champion of the World Boxing Association). Neither of the Mexican fighters had a professional loss going into the fight at The Forum in Los Angeles at Inglewood. Zarate had 45 wins, 44 of them by knockout, while all 29 of Zamora's fights were won by knockout. However, neither the WBC nor the WBA sanctioned the eagerly-anticipated fight. In the fourth round, Zamora was unable to continue after being knocked down twice by Zarate. Zamora continued as WBA champion, and Zarate would continue as WBC champ until 1979.
- The African nation of Ethiopia terminated its military relationship with the United States, closing the Kagnew Station, the U.S. consulate in Asmara, all U.S. Information Service offices, and the U.S. Navy Medical Research Center. The move came after the U.S. had announced on February 25 that it was reducing military aid because of Ethiopia's violations of human rights. On April 27, the U.S. terminated all arms shipments to Ethiopia.
- The World Health Organization (WHO) declared that the smallpox virus had been completely eradicated in India and that the African nation of Somalia was the only country with known cases of smallpox. A WHO campaign to wipe out the disease in India followed death of 31,000 people in 1973 and 1974.
- The government of Pakistan imposed censorship of the press on all Pakistani newspapers after officials concluded that "exaggerated or wrong reporting" had been made of the deaths during protests over the imposition of martial law.
- Soviet Ukrainian dissident Myroslav Marynovych was arrested in the Ukrainian SSR city of Drohobych along with Mykola Matusevych, and charged with "anti-Soviet agitation" for his activities in the Ukrainian Helsinki Group. Marynovych would spend the next seven years in the VS-389 security camp at Perm in the Russian SFSR, followed by three years of exile in the village of the Kazakh SSR before being allowed to return home.
- Born:
  - John Cena, American professional wrestler with 16 WWE championships; in West Newbury, Massachusetts
  - Kal Penn (stage name for Kalpen Suresh Modi), American film and TV actor known for portraying Kumar Patel in the Harold & Kumar film series, later a staffer at the White House for President Barack Obama; in Montclair, New Jersey
  - John Oliver, British-born American TV comedian and host; in Birmingham, England
  - Andruw Jones, Curaçao-born major league baseball player and 2005 MLB home run leader, with a total 434 homers in his 16-season career; in Willemstad
- Died: Lawrence Revere (pen name for Griffith K. Owens), 61, American gambler and professional blackjack player known for developing several card counting strategies (notably the "Revere Point Count") and his book Playing Blackjack as a Business, died of cancer.

== April 24, 1977 (Sunday) ==
- Abu Abbas (alias for Muhammad Zaidan) founded the Palestinian Liberation Front (PLF) terrorist organization after having become dissatisfied with the Popular Front for the Liberation of Palestine – General Command (PFLP-GC) led by Ahmed Jibril. The PLF would become notorious in 1985 for carrying out the Achille Lauro hijacking, the seizure of a cruise ship and 97 of its passengers.
- Born:
  - Carlos Beltrán, Puerto Rican U.S. baseball player, 1989 AL Rookie of the Year and nine-time MLB All-Star; in Manatí, Puerto Rico
  - Krishna Poonia, Indian Olympic track-and-field competitor; in Agroha, Haryana

== April 25, 1977 (Monday) ==
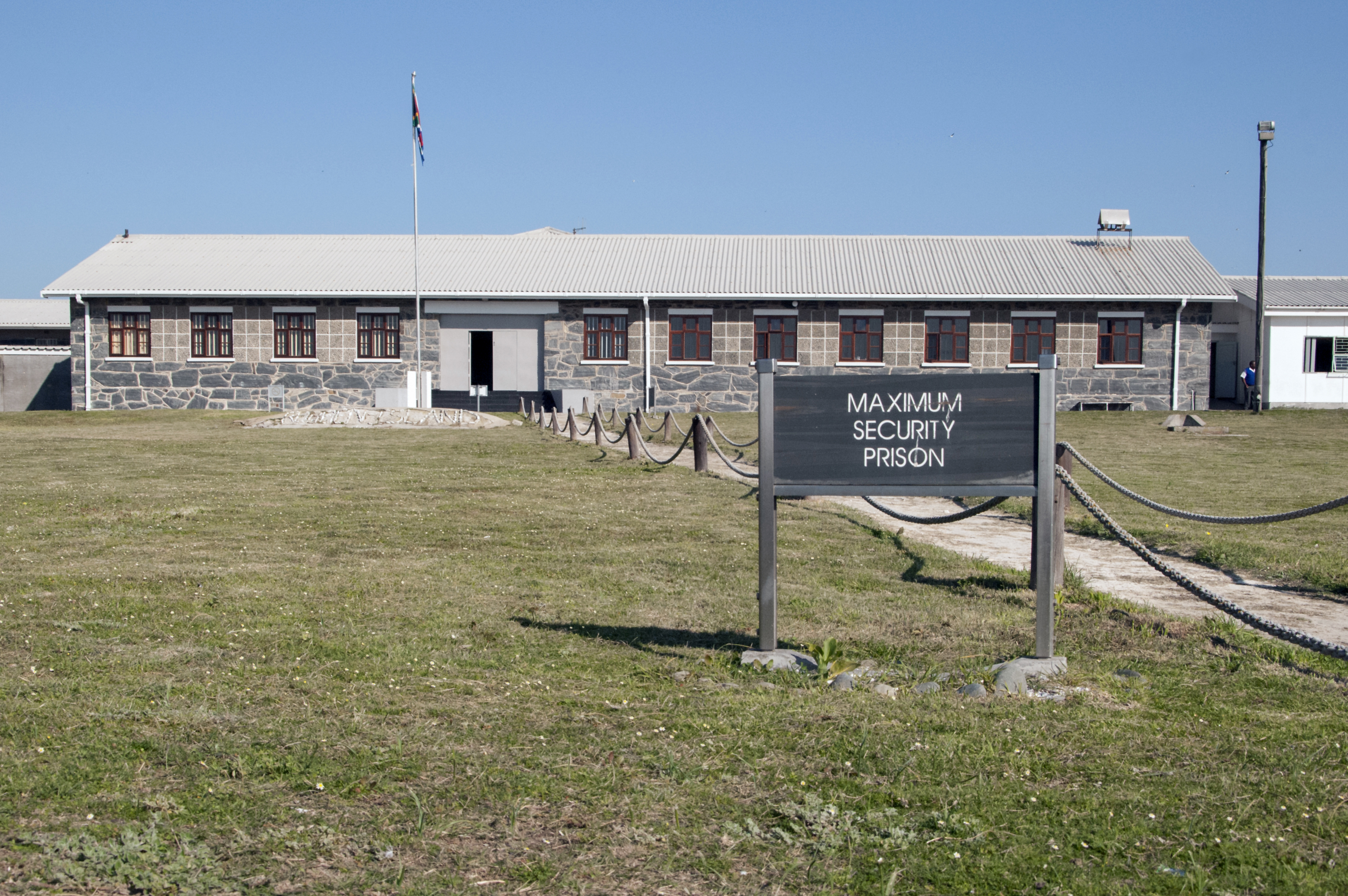
The Robben Island prison in 2018

- A group of reporters became the first outsiders ever allowed to visit South Africa's secret maximum security prison at Robben Island, 7 miles (11 km) off of the coast of Cape Town, where 370 non-white political prisoners were incarcerated by South Africa's white-minority government. The prison, whose inmates included Nelson Mandela, Walter Sisulu, and Govan Mbeki of the African National Congress, had been opened on April 1, 1961. On the day of the tour, Mandela was seen by reporters while he was "clearing weeds from a gravel and dirt pathway with a shovel", but reporters were not allowed to interview any of the inmates. The media was allowed to see Mandela's prison cell.
- East of New Zealand, the Japanese fishing trawler Zuiyō Maru caught the zuiyo-maru carcass, the 3,950 pounds (1,790 kg), 33 feet (10 m) decomposing body of a large, unidentifiable sea creature that resembled descriptions of the prehistoric plesiosaur. The trawler's captain, Akira Tanaka, ultimately dumped the carcass back into the ocean because of the danger of contaminating the ship's cargo of caught fish. Samples of tissue saved by the crew were later found to be similar to that of a basking shark.
- Born: Manolo Cardona, Colombian TV and film actor; in Popayán

== April 26, 1977 (Tuesday) ==
- The U.S. Supreme Court ruled, 5 to 4, that laws prohibiting children born out of wedlock from inheriting from their fathers were prohibited by the Equal Protection Clause of the 14th Amendment of the U.S. Constitution. At the time, laws of descent and distribution in 20 of the 50 U.S. states limited intestate inheritance to "legitimate" children. Writing for the majority in Trimble v. Gordon (430 U.S. 762), Justice Lewis F. Powell wrote "We have expressly considered and rejected the argument that a state may attempt to influence the actions of men and women by imposing sanctions on the children born of their illegitimate relationships," and added "Difficulties in proving paternity in some situations do not justify the total statutory disinheritance of illegitimate children whose fathers die intestate."

Studio 54

- Studio 54, known as the most trendy disco nightclub of the United States in the 1970s because of its popularity among celebrities, opened in New York City at 254 West 54th Street. "
- Polaroid Corporation founder and chairman Edwin H. Land unveiled the invention that would be a financial disaster for the camera and film company, "Polavision", at its annual stockholders meeting in Needham, Massachusetts.
- Born:
  - Samantha Cristoforetti, Italian astronaut, at 199 days (on International Space Station Expeditions 42 and 43) the one-time holder of the record for the longest spaceflight by a woman, and current holder of the longest uninterrupted spaceflight by a European astronaut; in Milan
  - Tom Welling, American TV and film actor known as the star of Smallville as high school student Clark Kent; in Putnam Valley, New York
  - Jason Earles, American TV and film actor known for Hannah Montana; in San Diego
- Died: Zdzislaw Marchwicki, 49, Polish serial killer known as "The Zaglebie Vampire" after being convicted of 14 murders of women, was hanged in a prison in Katowice. His brother Jan Marchwicki, 48, convicted as an accomplice, was hanged an hour later.

== April 27, 1977 (Wednesday) ==
- The U.S. Federal Highway Administration (FHA) published proposed regulations to convert all road signs in the U.S. to the metric system, pursuant to the authority of the Metric Conversion Act of 1975. The proposed rules were published in the Federal Register, with a 45-day public notice and comment period. If effective, speed limit signs would be changed from miles to kilometers during the summer of 1978, in a 90-day period running from July 1, to September 30, 1978, and distance and milepost signs would be changed to metric by September 30, 1982. The Associated Press noted that "There is no plan to print both metric and English figures on signs to ease the familiarization," and that speed signs would be rounded up to "the nearest easily recognizable number", with 55 miles per hour (89 km/h) to be changed to 90 kilometres per hour (56 mph). By June 8, FHA Administrator William M. Cox, would pass word through Iowa Congressman Charles E. Grassley that negative comments had been enough of a protest against the metric system.
- Died:
  - Charles Alston, 69, African-American artist and sculptor
  - Stanley Adams, 62, American TV actor, shot himself to death after a bout with depression.
  - Scott Bradley, 85, American composer and film scorer

== April 28, 1977 (Thursday) ==
- Following the 504 Sit-in protests that began on April 5, the U.S. Department of Health, Education and Welfare (HEW), led by Secretary Joseph A. Califano, issued 47 pages of regulations banning discrimination against handicapped Americans, estimated at 35,000,000 of the 200 million residents of the U.S. by HEW. For the first time, the federal government required that new buildings be handicapped-accessible, and ordered that existing structures associated with HEW activities be modified. The new rules barred employers from refusing to hire a handicapped person if the handicap posed no impairment to performing the requirements of the job, and required that all handicapped children be entitled to the equal rights in public education.
- In West Germany, Red Army Faction terrorists Andreas Baader, Gudrun Ensslin, and Jan-Carl Raspe were sentenced to life imprisonment by a federal court in Stuttgart.
- Died:
  - Sepp Herberger, 80, German footballer who coached the West German national soccer football team to winning the 1954 World Cup
  - Ricardo Cortez (stage name for Jacob Kranze), 76, American character actor known for portraying the "Latin lover in film despite an Austrian heritage
  - Lieutenant General Carlos Fernández Vallespín, 63, Spanish Army officer who served as Chief of Staff of the Spanish Armed Forces for Francisco Franco's Alto Estado Mayor (AEM) and for the Junta de Jefes de Estado Mayor for King Juan Carlos during Spain's transition to democracy, died of a heart attack.

== April 29, 1977 (Friday) ==
- The CBN Satellite Service began transmitting to cable television systems across the United States, after Southern Baptist evangelist Pat Robertson leased transponder space for his creation, the Christian Broadcasting Network. Robertson's programming came from his WYAH-TV station in Portsmouth, Virginia. In the years that followed, CBN would gradually change its identification to "The Family Channel" in 1988. Robertson would sell the network in 1990 and the original CBN service is now owned by The Walt Disney Company and is the Freeform cable channel.
- British Aerospace was founded as a statutory corporation in the United Kingdom, created by the government nationalization and merger of British Aircraft Corporation, Hawker Siddeley Aviation, Hawker Siddeley Dynamics and Scottish Aviation. The nationalization was authorized by the Aircraft and Shipbuilding Industries Act 1977, which had been enacted on March 17. The company would become BAE Systems in 1999.

== April 30, 1977 (Saturday) ==
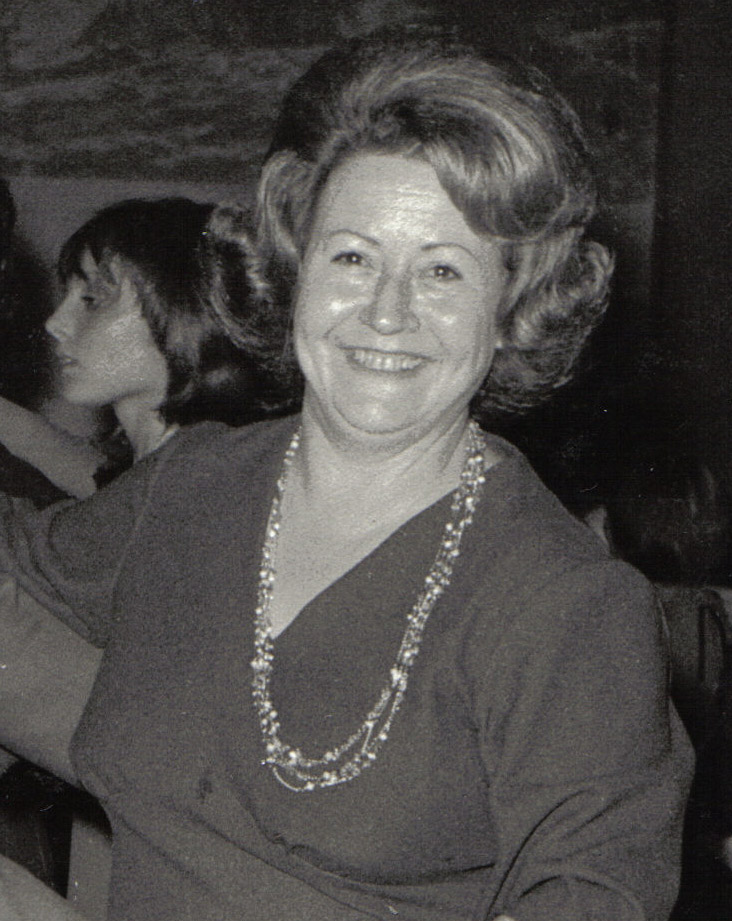
Mrs. de Vincenti before she became a desaparecido

- A group of 14 women in Argentina whose children were among the 30,000 desaparecidos— people arrested by the military government and never seen again— took the brave action of demonstrating against the dictatorship while in front of the Casa Rosada, the presidential palace in Buenos Aires that housed the offices of General Jorge Rafael Videla. "Las Madres de Plaza de Mayo" ("The Mothers of the Plaza de Mayo"). The leader of the group, Azucena Villaflor de Vincenti, was the mother of Nestor de Vincenti, who had disappeared in 1976 after his arrest by Argentine security forces. She would become one of the desaparecidos on December 10, 1977. Her body would not be identified until more than 25 years later, in 2003.
- Fighting began between the Communist governments of Democratic Kampuchea (formerly Cambodia) and the Socialist Republic of Vietnam. Kampuchea's army began a surprise attack on Vietnamese villages in the An Giang Province, and Vietnam retaliated by invading Kampuchea. The Vietnamese would withdraw in January, but would invade on December 21, 1978, after the Khmer Rouge's perpetration of the Ba Chúc massacre on April 30, 1978.
- The Indian state of Punjab was placed under President's rule and Chief Minister Zail Singh was removed from office by order of Acting President B. D. Jatti, until new state elections could be held in June.
- The English rock group Led Zeppelin set a record for paid attendance at a music concert, attracting 76,229 fans to the Pontiac Silverdome, a pro football stadium near the U.S. city of Detroit. In 1973, they had set a record by bring 56,800 fans to Tampa Stadium in Florida, before The Who broke the record in 1975 by playing at Pontiac in front of 75,972 fans.
- Italian-born U.S. professional wrestler Bruno Sammartino, who had been the star attraction of the World Wide Wrestling Federation as the circuit's world heavyweight champion for 11 of the past 14 years (with the exception of nearly three between January 1971 and December 1973), was defeated by Superstar Billy Graham (ring name for Eldridge Coleman).
- The Nitty Gritty Dirt Band became the first U.S. rock band to be allowed to tour the Soviet Union, with its first concert taking place in Riga of the Latvian SSR. It then appeared at Tbilisi in the Georgian SSR and Yerevan in the Armenian SSR (before 21,000 people in an outdoor concert) and then in the Russian SFSR at Leningrad before their Moscow debut on May 21.
