= Naum Babaev =

Russian businessperson

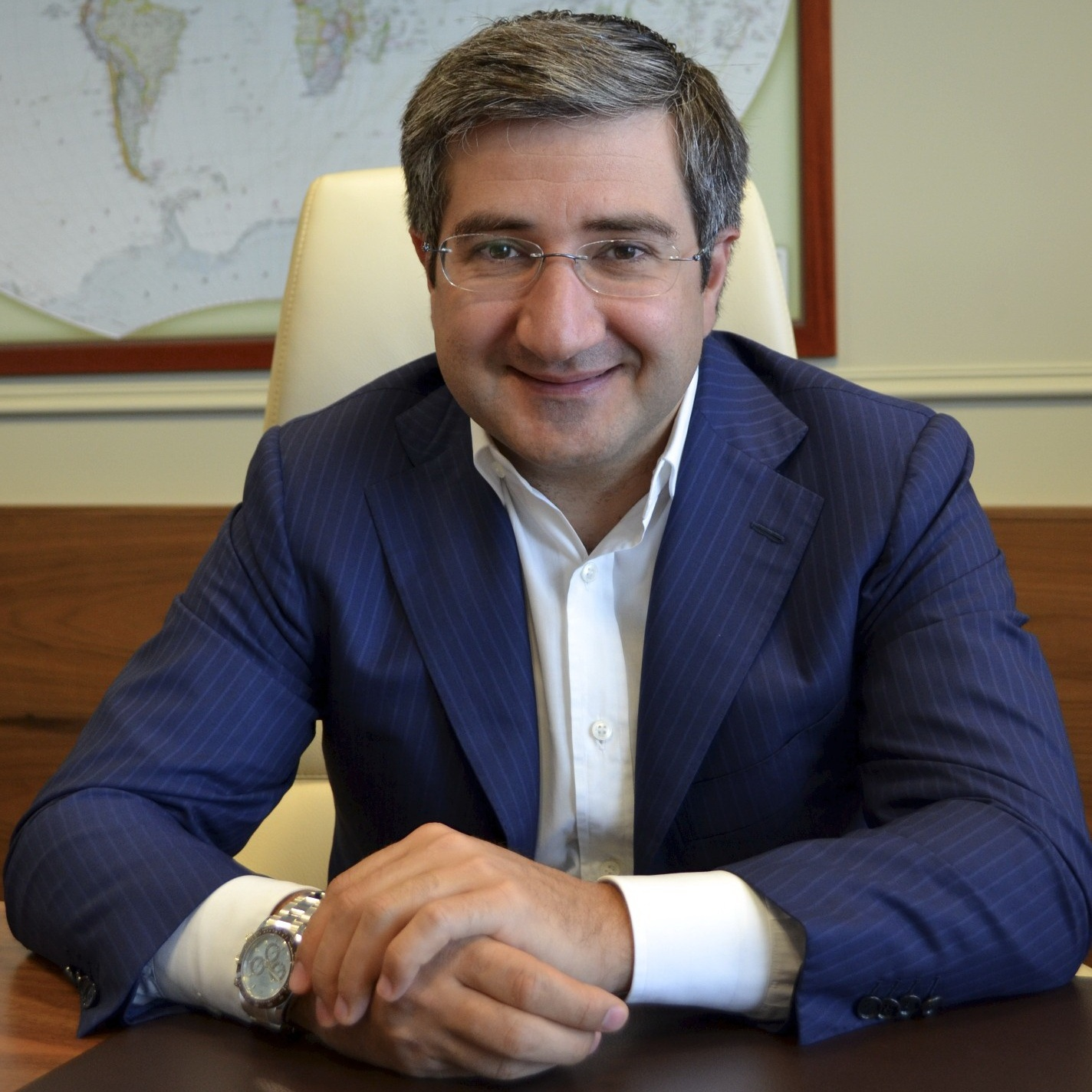
- Born: Naum Alexandrovich Babaev; 17 March 1977 (age 49); Kislovodsk, Stavropol Krai, Russian SFSR, Soviet Union
- Citizenship: Russian, Israeli
- Education: Moscow Finance Institute
- Occupation: Businessman
- Known for: Co-Owner of the Rusmolco and the Damaté Group

Naum Alexandrovich Babaev (Russian: Наум Александрович Бабаев, IPA: nɐ′um ɐlʲɪk′sandrɐvitɕ bɐ′baʲef) is a Russian-Israeli entrepreneur, the founder of the Russian dairy company Rusmolco, a major raw milk producer, and the co-founder and joint owner of DAMATÉ group, a large agricultural holding specialising in poultry farming, dairy farming, and milk processing.

== Education and career ==
Naum Babaev was born in Kislovodsk, Stavropol Krai on March 17, 1977, into the family of Rosa Michailovna and Alexander Naumovich Babaev.

Аfter finishing high school in 1994, Naum entered the Financial Academy under the Government of the Russian Federation and graduated in 1999. Being a college undergraduate, he started off as a financial analyst at Cherkizovsky, a major Russian meat processing plant, which was subsequently reorganized into a JSC Group Cherkizovo, Russia's largest producer of meat products.

In 2000, Babaev took over as a head of the poultry production business unit in the company's agro-industrial complex and was managing it until 2005, when, due to the merger of the company's agro-industrial and meat processing units, a larger facility was formed, namely CHERKIZOVO Group; Naum was appointed the company's Strategy and development director.

According to Vedomosti, the prominent Russian business daily, his achievements at the position were fully recognized with CHERKIZOVO's IPO launch in 2006.

At the beginning of 2007, Babaev resigned to proceed on his own. Cherkizovo's official statement marked his contribution to the group.

== Business ==
Rusmolco was established in October 2007, when Babaev started two mega dairy farms, from the ground up in Penza Oblast about 700 kilometers south-east of Moscow. By 2011, Rusmolco had become a major regional raw milk producer, doubling the average milk productivity in Russia at 9270 kilograms per cow, against the average 4500 kilograms, according to the data of the Ministry of Agriculture of the Russian Federation.

At the beginning of 2012, Rusmolco embarked on a strategic cooperation with a Singapore company, Olam International, a leading agri-business operating in 70 countries. OLAM invested $75 million in the deal, thereby attaining 75% of Rusmolco assets. The partners announced their intention to form a large-scale dairy enterprise with $400 million investment capital (the initial 20-thousand milking herd was meant to reach up to 50 thousand heads in the short run).

In 2012, by a year-end estimation of the Institute for the Agricultural Market Studies, Rusmolco secured the fourth place among the five largest raw milk producers in the Russian Federation.

In 2011, shortly after the Olam International deal, Babaev undertook the effort to consolidate the leftover assets (namely, the turkey production plant, the PENZENSKY dairy complex as well as a veal-and-milk production facility in Penza and Tyumen regions, and 25K hectares of agricultural land. The effort had been a success, resulting in the launch of the agro-industrial holding company Damaté Group.

The Group's priority was turkey meat production. At the time, turkey was not popular with the Russians; the average consumption per capita wobbled at 0, 8–1,0 kg, with the overall production hardly totaling 120-150 thousand tons per year.

By the end of 2016, Damaté became the largest turkey producing company in Russia. According to the Agrifood Strategies data, in 2016, the company produced 60,800 tons of turkey in carcass weight. The Damaté leadership had also been confirmed by Rosptitsesoyuz, the Russian Union of Poultry Producers.

At the end of 2016, Damaté had been ranked among the top-100 largest meat producers in this country.

In 2012, Babaev acquired the dairy product plant Penzensky (MOLCOM), the largest processor of milk in Penza region with a cheese factory in Belinsky town.

At the end of 2013, Damaté, in partnership with food group Danone, launched a high-powered production of the premium quality milk in Tyumen region, Western Siberia. At the beginning of 2017, Tyumen delivered its first tons of milk to Danone production facilities

Babaev owns Damaté on a par with the holding's CEO Rashid Khairov. They had met in 1998, before the Damaté endeavor. According to Vedomosti, in their current partnership, Babaev is implementing the strategic management of the firm, while Khairov is being responsible for the day-to-day management.

Babaev also invested in an Israeli food start up «Entoprotech »

== Personal life ==
Naum Babaev is married to Anna, a photographer. The family is raising three children, Alexander (2006), Mikhail (2009), and Elizaveta (2013).

== Israeli Citizenship ==
On December 8, 2022, news portal «The Moscow Post» announced that Babaev got an Israeli citizenship in October 2021 due to his Jewish ancestry. Additionally, the portal reported that the attorney who helped with obtaining the citizenship did not receive due fees, and applied to a court in Russia to rectify this.
