= 1977 Northern Mariana Islands constitutional referendum =

Ballot measure in the Northern Mariana Islands

A constitutional referendum was held in the Northern Mariana Islands on 6 March 1977. The new constitution was approved by 93% of voters and came into force on 9 January 1978.

== Background ==
A Constitutional Assembly had been elected and drafted the new constitution between 18 October until 5 December 1976.

== Results ==
Choice	Votes	%
For	3,557	93.24
Against	258	6.76
Invalid/blank votes	19	–
Total	3,834	100
Registered voters/turnout	6,554	58.50
Source: Direct Democracy
