= January 1977 =

Month of 1977

<<	January 1977					>>
Su	Mo	Tu	We	Th	Fr	Sa
						1
2	3	4	5	6	7	8
9	10	11	12	13	14	15
16	17	18	19	20	21	22
23	24	25	26	27	28	29
30	31

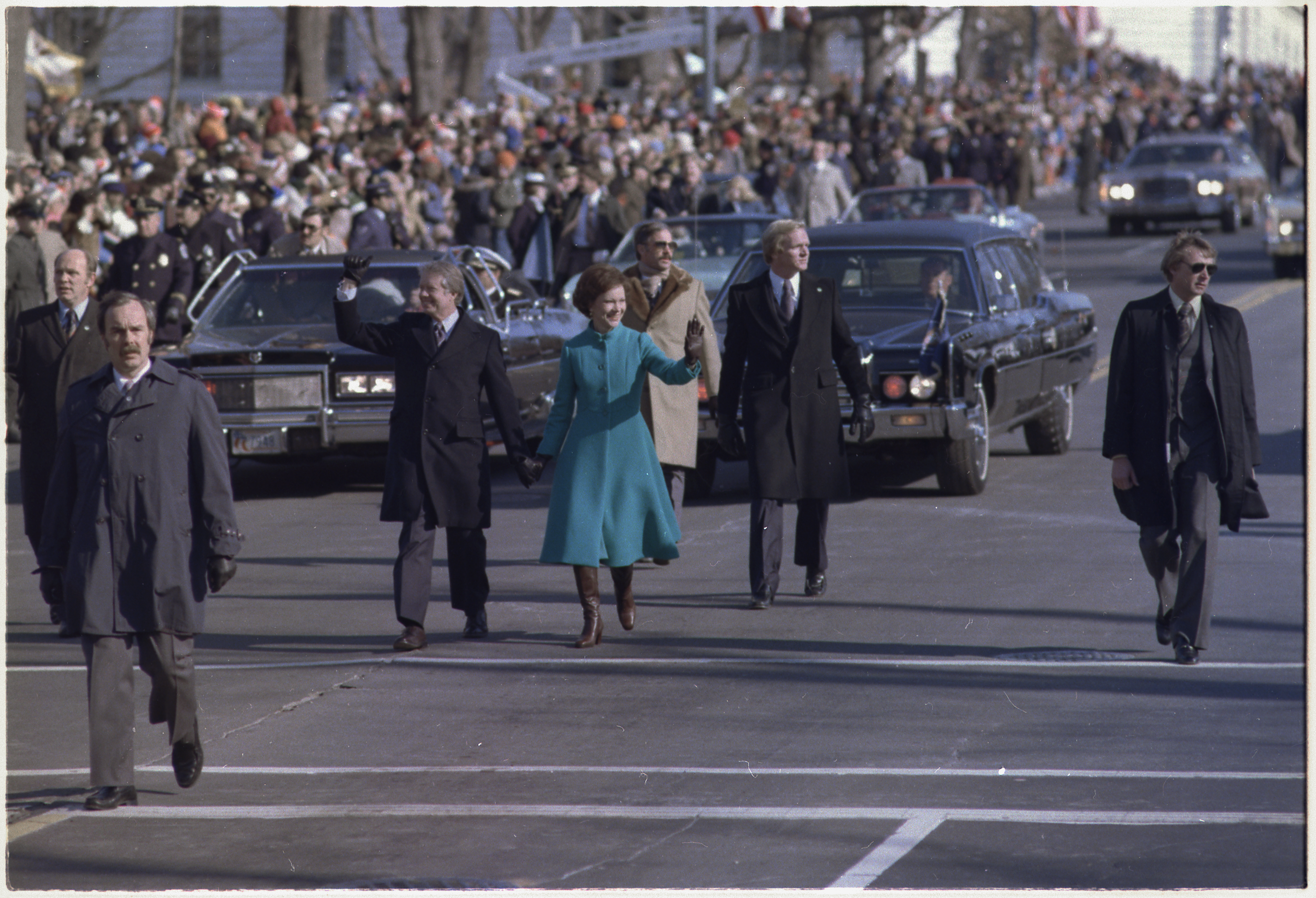
January 20, 1977: Jimmy Carter inaugurated as 39th U.S. president

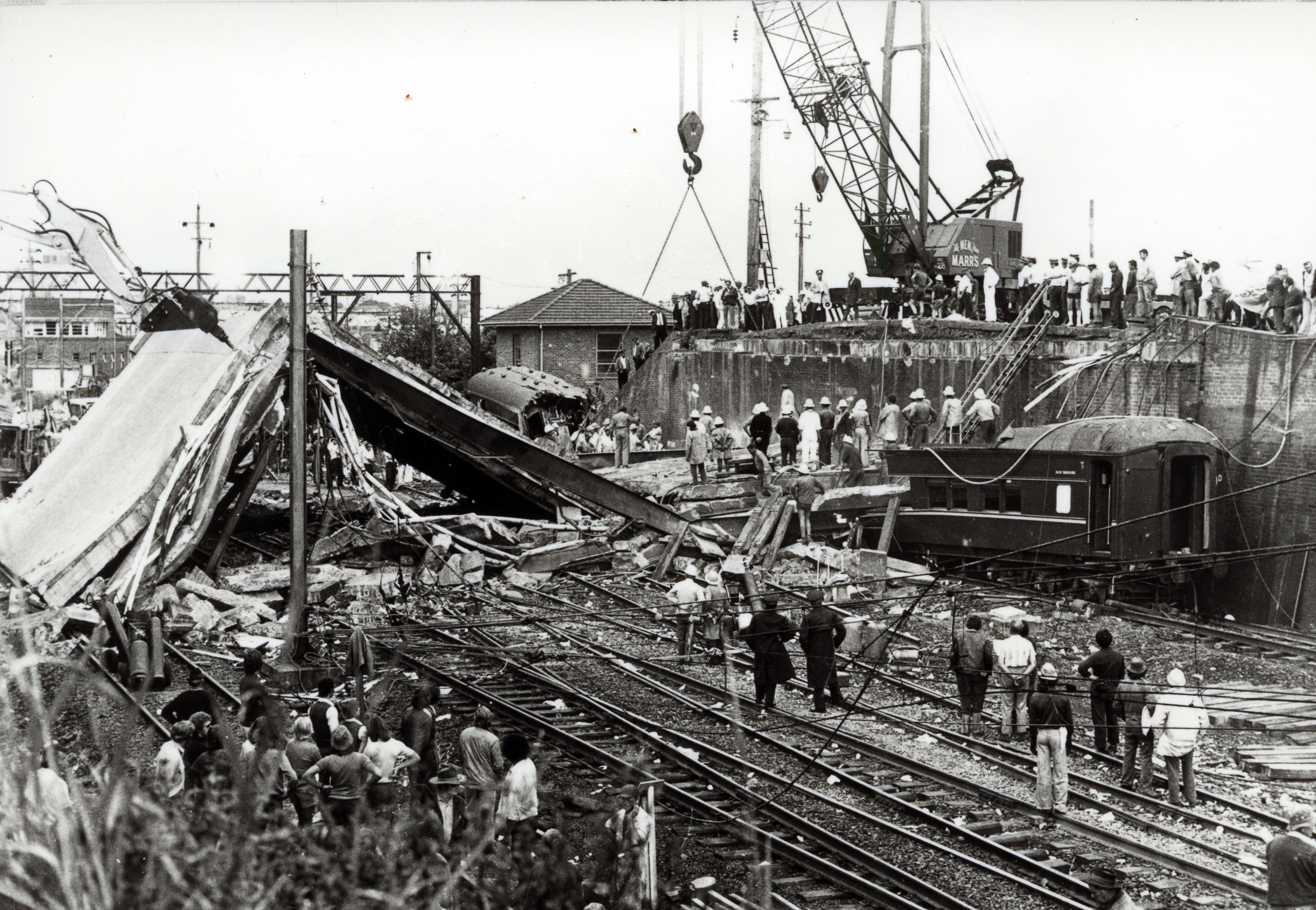
January 18, 1977: Worst railway crash in Australian history kills 83 people.

January 31, 1977: "Inside-out" Centre Pompidou opens in Paris

The following events occurred in January 1977:

== January 1, 1977 (Saturday) ==
- Jacqueline Means became the first woman to be officially ordained as a priest in the U.S. Episcopal Church. The Episcopal Bishop of Erie, Pennsylvania, conducted the ordination for Means at her All Saints Church in Indianapolis, Indiana.
- The University of Pittsburgh Panthers, ranked #1 in the wire service polls at the end of the 1976 college football season, defeated the #5-ranked Georgia Bulldogs, 27 to 3, in the Sugar Bowl to preserve its unbeaten record. Pitt would be voted #1 in the final AP and UPI polls for the unofficial college football championship.
- Born:
  - Hasan Salihamidžić, Bosnian footballer and sports administrator known for 20 seasons with Bayern Munich and 42 appearances for the Bosnia and Herzegovina national team; in Jablanica, Bosnia and Herzegovina
  - Jerry Yan (stage name for Liao Yangzhen), Taiwanese TV actor and singer; in Taoyuan
- Died:
  - Roland Hayes, 89, African-American lyric tenor and composer.
  - Danny Frisella, 30, American baseball pitcher for the Milwaukee Brewers, was killed when the dune buggy in which he was riding overturned.

== January 2, 1977 (Sunday) ==
- The nation of South Yemen and its capital, Aden, switched from driving on the left side of the road (its law during its British colonial days) to driving on the right, consistent with the rest of the Arab nations.
- Nine people were killed in a hotel fire at the Walnut Towers Motor Inn in Shamokin, Pennsylvania. Two volunteer firemen, one of whom was injured while trying to rescue the hotel's manager, were arrested six days later and charged with one count of arson and nine counts of homicide.
- Died:
  - Erroll Garner, 55, American jazz pianist and composer known for the hit song "Misty", died of cardiac arrest from emphysema.
  - Pete Cross, 28, former NBA player, died at his home of an epileptic seizure.
  - Émilien Amaury, 67, French publisher, was killed when he was thrown from his horse while riding in the Chantilly Forest.

== January 3, 1977 (Monday) ==
- Apple Computer, Inc. was incorporated by Steve Wozniak and Steve Jobs, with a headquarters in Cupertino, California.
- The controversial 42nd Amendment to the Constitution of India went into effect, granting India's Parliament the authority to make further changes to the nation's Constitution without ratification by its states. The change in the fundamental law also prohibited India's court system from reviewing any of the amendments, and required two-thirds approval by Parliament to repeal a law.
- In the royal wedding in Thailand, Crown Prince Vajiralongkorn married his first cousin, Soamsawali Kitiyakara. The ceremony took place at exactly 8:49 a.m. at Princess Sangwan's palace in Bangkok, a time planned by the royal astrologer. The couple would divorce in 1991, before Vajiralongkorn's ascension to the throne in 2016 as King of Thailand.
- BBC Radio Cymru, the first all-Welsh language radio station, went on the air in Britain at 6:45 with news from Gwyn Llewellyn and Geraint Jones, followed at 7:00 with the first episode of the breakfast show cy:Helo Bobol ("Hello, People!"), presented by Hywel Gwynfryn.
- In Lebanon, at least 24 people were killed in Beirut when a car bomb exploded near the headquarters of the Phalangist security service in the Christian district of Ashrafieyeh.
- The daily newspaper comic strip The Amazing Spider-Man was first published, 16 years after Spider-Man had been introduced as a comic book.
- The Pitt Panthers were voted as the national college football champion, under the system recognized by the NCAA prior to playoffs, based on the poll of sportswriters by the Associated Press, and a poll of 42 coaches by United Press International. In the UPI poll, Pitt outpointed the USC Trojans, 416 to 376.
- Died:
  - Avraham Ofer, 54, Israeli Minister of Housing, shot himself to death after driving to a beach near his home. Ofer had been implicated in a corruption scandal that would become known as the Yadlin affair.
  - Harry Hansen, 92, American author and encyclopedia editor

== January 4, 1977 (Tuesday) ==
- U.S. Congressman Thomas P. "Tip" O'Neill of Massachusetts was formally elected Speaker of the House in a 291 to 142 vote along party lines, as Democrats voted unanimously for him while Republicans voted unanimously for Minority Leader John J. Rhodes of Ohio. Neither O'Neill nor Rhodes voted.
- Hasan Muhammad di Tiro, founder of the Free Aceh Movement in Indonesia, proclaimed the independence of that nation's Aceh Province as the Acehnese Republic. The Free Aceh movement would be suppressed by the government by 1986.
- Following up on its December 27 announcement of an 18% increase in wages over a five-year period, the Soviet Union's government announced that it would cut prices for consumer goods by as much as 25% for "knitwear, underwear, women's footwear, medicines, refrigerators and some TV sets", while prices would increase for "carpets, some luxury items, handmade clothing and public transportation."
- Born:
  - Falalu A Dorayi, Nigerian film director; in Gwale
  - Irán Castillo, Mexican TV actress; in Veracruz
  - Tim Wheeler, Northern Irish singer-songwriter and musician, frontman of Ash, in Downpatrick
- Died: Ibrahim Biçakçiu, 71, Albanian politician who collaborated with the German occupation of Albania during World War II and was the last German-appointed nominal Prime Minister of Albania for 50 days in 1944. After his release from prison in 1962, he was given a job cleaning public restrooms in his hometown of Elbasan.

== January 5, 1977 (Wednesday) ==
- The protest occupation of Bastion Point, known as Takaparawhau to the Māori people in New Zealand, began after the New Zealand government announced that it had acquired the land and would be auctioning it to the highest bidder for development of high income housing. Joe Hawke, a Māori leader, led a group that camped at the site, then began planting gardens, two days before construction was to begin, to prevent the loss of the scenic land on Waitematā Harbour. The protest would continue for 506 days, until May 25, 1978, with the arrest of the occupiers by police assisted by the New Zealand Army. A new government would return Takaparawhau/Baston Point to the Māoris in 1988.
- A disgruntled former pilot for Australia's Connellan Airways, a small commuter airline, killed himself and four other people by crashing an airplane into the airline's offices at Alice Springs. Colin Forman, who had been fired in September, drove about 1,200 miles (2,000 km) from his home in the Queensland city of Mount Isa to Wyndham Airport in Western Australia, stole a twin-engine Beechcraft Baron from the airport, and then flew it 685 miles (1,102 km) to Alice Springs and the building housing Ord Air Charter.
- Israel's parliament, the Knesset, voted to dissolve itself and to schedule national elections for May 17.
- Died: Matt McGinn, 48, Scottish folk singer and songwriter died in a fire after falling asleep while smoking in bed.

== January 6, 1977 (Thursday) ==
- Charter 77, a manifesto by Czech and Slovak citizens of Czechoslovakia against the eastern European nation's Communist government, was published in West Germany along with the names of 242 people who had signed the document, including future president Václav Havel. The Czechoslovak government followed up from the publication by arresting the signers.
- Andrew Daulton Lee, an American spying for the Soviet Union, was arrested by police in front of the Soviet Embassy in Mexico City. Initially charged with littering for throwing trash on the ground, Lee was searched and found to have a microfilm of top secret U.S. documents. During his interrogation under torture, Lee admitted to espionage and implicated his friend, Christopher John Boyce, who would be arrested in the U.S. 10 days later. The next day, based on Lee's statement, police also arrested Ivan Rogalsky, a Soviet resident of the U.S., and charged him with passing secret agent about the U.S. space shuttle program to Yevgeniy Karpov, a KGB agent who was a member of the Soviet delegation to the United Nations. Lee would be convicted of espionage on May 14, and sentenced to life imprisonment, but would be paroled in 1998.
- Born:
  - Tom Boxer (stage name for Cosmin Simionică), Romanian musician and record producer; in Craiova
  - Genevieve O'Reilly, Irish film actress; in Dublin.
- Died:
  - Dolly Sinatra, 79, mother of singer Frank Sinatra, was killed along with three other people in the crash of a chartered Jet Avia Learjet 24 that had taken off from Palm Springs, California, toward Las Vegas. The Learjet wreckage was found on the slope of Mount San Gorgonia, 22 miles (35 km) from Palm Springs, after a two-day search.
  - Dardo Cabo, 36, Argentine journalist and right-wing terrorist, was executed in detention by Argentina's military government.
  - Abdul Majid Daryabadi, 84, Indian Muslim scholar

== January 7, 1977 (Friday) ==
- Police in France raided a hotel in Paris and arrested Palestinian terrorist leader Abu Daoud, a suspected leader of the massacre of 11 Israeli athletes at the 1972 Summer Olympics. A French court rejected West Germany's extradition request, however, and deported Daoud to Algeria on January 11 before a new request could be made.
- Pakistan's Prime Minister Zulfiqar Ali Bhutto announced in a speech in the nation's 216-seat National Assembly that he would ask the president to dissolve Parliament and to schedule a new election. Voting for the National Assembly would take place on March 7.
- Born: Andi Siebenhofer, Austrian extreme sports athlete; in Knittelfeld
- Died:
  - Marvin Pipkin, 87, American engineer and inventor known for creating the "soft white" frosted light bulb
  - Bunker Spreckels (Adolph Bernard Spreckels III), 27, American surfboard designer and heir to the Spreckels Sugar Company fortune, died of an overdose of morphine.

== January 8, 1977 (Saturday) ==
- A bomb explosion killed 7 people in a crowded Moscow subway car at 5:33 in the afternoon (1433 UTC). The train car was between the Izmailovskaya and Pervomaiskaya stations of the Moscow Metro when the blast occurred. At 6:05, a second bomb detonated inside a grocery store close to KGB headquarters, and at 6:10, a third bomb exploded near another grocery store on 25 October Street, just a few hundred meters away from the headquarters of the Communist Party of the Soviet Union. TASS, the Soviet news agency reported the explosion two days later with a statement that the subway blast was not large and that "medical help was given to those suffering injury," without mention of deaths. The bombings would later be attributed to three members of an Armenian separatist group, who would be executed on January 29, 1979.
- Soviet Army General Viktor Kulikov was announced as the new commander in chief of the Warsaw Pact military alliance to replace the late Marshal Ivan Yakubovsky.
- Died:
  - Juan Jose Peruyero, 46, Cuban exile to the U.S., opponent of the Cuban communist government and veteran of the Bay of Pigs Invasion, was shot to death by two men as he stepped outside of his home in Miami.
  - William D. Pawley, 80, U.S. financier and philanthropist, and former U.S. ambassador to Peru and to Brazil, shot himself to death.

== January 9, 1977 (Sunday) ==
- The Oakland Raiders defeated the Minnesota Vikings, 32 to 14, to win Super Bowl XI before a record crowd of 103,438 spectators at the Rose Bowl stadium in Pasadena, California. The telecast of the game on NBC was watched by an estimated 81,900,000 people, at the time a record for the largest audience to watch a live sporting event.
- The "shoot-out" was used for the very first time in FIFA World Cup competition, after Tunisia and visiting Morocco remained drawn, 1 to 1, at the end of extra time in the first round of the qualification tournament. The teams had played to a 1–1 draw in the first game in Morocco. Referee Walter Hungerbühler of Switzerland ordered five penalty shots apiece to resolve the tie, and Tunisia won the shootout, 4 to 2.

== January 10, 1977 (Monday) ==
- Mount Nyiragongo erupted in northeastern Zaire (now the Democratic Republic of the Congo). Since 1894, the volcanic crater had housed an active lake of lava and when the walls of the crater fractured, lava flowed down the mountain at speeds of up to 35 miles per hour (56 km/h), killing at least 50 people in the villages of Kibati and Moniki. A Reuters report after the volcano's re-eruption in 1994 noted that "seventy deaths" were reported to the United Nations in the 1977 event.

== January 11, 1977 (Tuesday) ==
- In Pakistan, four days after Prime Minister Bhutto had announced his intention to hold general elections, the nine major opposition parties, ranging from the right-wing Jamaat-e-Islami to the leftist National Awami Party, organized into the Pakistan National Alliance (PNA). In the March 8 election, Bhutto's Pakistan Peoples Party would win 155 of the 216 seats. The PNA, which would get only 36, accused Bhutto of fraud, followed by mass protests, rioting, and the arrest of opposition leaders.
- Soviet television premiered its first rock and roll music show, Melodii i ritmy zarubezhnoi estrady ("Melodies and Rhythms of Foreign Variety Music").
- The first episode of Finnish children's TV show Pikku Kakkonen ("Little Number Two") was aired on Yle TV2, and presented by Pekka Salo. The show celebrated its 49th anniversary in 2026.
- Born:
  - Anni Friesinger-Postma, German speed skater and three-time Olympic gold medalist; in Bad Reichenhall, West Germany
  - Devin Ratray, American film actor; in New York City

== January 12, 1977 (Wednesday) ==
- Stewart Copeland of the U.S., drummer for the band Curved Air, arrived in London and met in a jam session with English schoolteacher Gordon Sumner, singer and bass player for the band Last Exit, and guitarist Henry Padovani of Corsica. Copeland persuaded Sumner and Padovani to join him and to form a new rock band, which they named The Police. The group would make its appearance on March 1 in Newport, Wales. Sumner, nicknamed "Sting", would later leave The Police to start a solo career.
- An avalanche in the Italian Alps buried part of the village of Foppolo in Bergamo province and killed eight people.
- Born:
  - Zurab Pololikashvili, Georgian diplomat and Secretary General, since 2018, of the United Nations World Tourism Organization; in Tbilisi, Georgian SSR, Soviet Union
  - Piolo Pascual, Filipino film and TV actor and producer; in Malate, Manila
- Died:
  - Yuri Soloviev, 36, Soviet ballet dancer and the premier danseur of the Kirov Ballet, shot himself to death at his dacha near Leningrad.
  - Henri-Georges Clouzot, 69, French film director known for The Wages of Fear, Les Diaboliques and ''The Mystery of Picasso

== January 13, 1977 (Thursday) ==
- All 90 people aboard Aeroflot Flight 3843 were killed when the Tupolev Tu-104 twinjet's left engine caught fire. The twinjet had taken off from Novosibirsk and was approaching its destination of Alma-Ata in the Kazakh SSR when the cabin filled with carbon monoxide, and crashed two miles short of the runway and burst into flames. The crash was not reported in the Soviet press but anonymous sources informed Western reporters of the crash 10 days later.
- The crash of a Japan Air Lines cargo plane killed three crew and two passengers shortly after the DC-8's pilot had performed the takeoff and ascent while drunk. Hauling a payload of 56 live cattle to Japan, the jet took off from Anchorage, Alaska, at 6:33 a.m. local time. The airplane stalled two minutes later and fell from an altitude of 160 feet (49 m) after having been "overrotated" to the left while making a turn. An autopsy of pilot Hugh Marsh found him to have a blood alcohol level of 0.298 percent (298 milligrams of alcohol per 100 milliliters of blood), almost three times as much as the 0.10 percent level defined as legally drunk. The takeoff had been allowed despite a telephone call to Japan Air Lines by the taxi driver who had taken the crew to the airport. The National Transportation Safety Board concluded that "the probable cause of the accident was a stall that resulted from the pilot's control inputs aggravated by airframe icing while the pilot was under the influence of alcohol. Contributing to the cause of this accident was the failure of the other flightcrew members to prevent the captain from attempting the flight."
- Born: Orlando Bloom, English action film actor known for The Hobbit and the Pirates of the Caribbean film series; in Canterbury, Kent
- Died: Ye Qisun, 78, persecuted Chinese physicist

== January 14, 1977 (Friday) ==
- The Soviet freighter Ivan Sechenov sank with the loss of 22 of her crew after colliding with the Greek cargo ship Praktikolas Maris in the Sea of Marmara in Turkey.
- The pilot for the popular TV anthology Fantasy Island aired in the U.S. as the feature for the Saturday Movie of the Week. The made-for-TV film, and a sequel, would prove popular enough for the ABC network to launch a weekly series on January 28, 1978.
- French singer Claudine Longet was found guilty of reckless homicide by a 12-person jury in the U.S. state of Colorado on charges arising from the shooting of professional skier Vladimir "Spider" Sabich. The charge was a misdemeanor rather than a felony, and carried with it a charge of no more than two years in jail or a fine of no more than $5,000, or both. The prosecution had sought a conviction for felony reckless manslaughter. She was sentenced on January 31 to 30 days of jail time and two years probation.
- Born:
  - Narain Karthikeyan, Indian race car driver and the first driver from India to compete in Formula One and NASCAR; in Coimbatore, Tamil Nadu state
  - Yandel (stage name for Llandel Veguilla), Puerto Rican American reggae singer; in Cayey, Puerto Rico
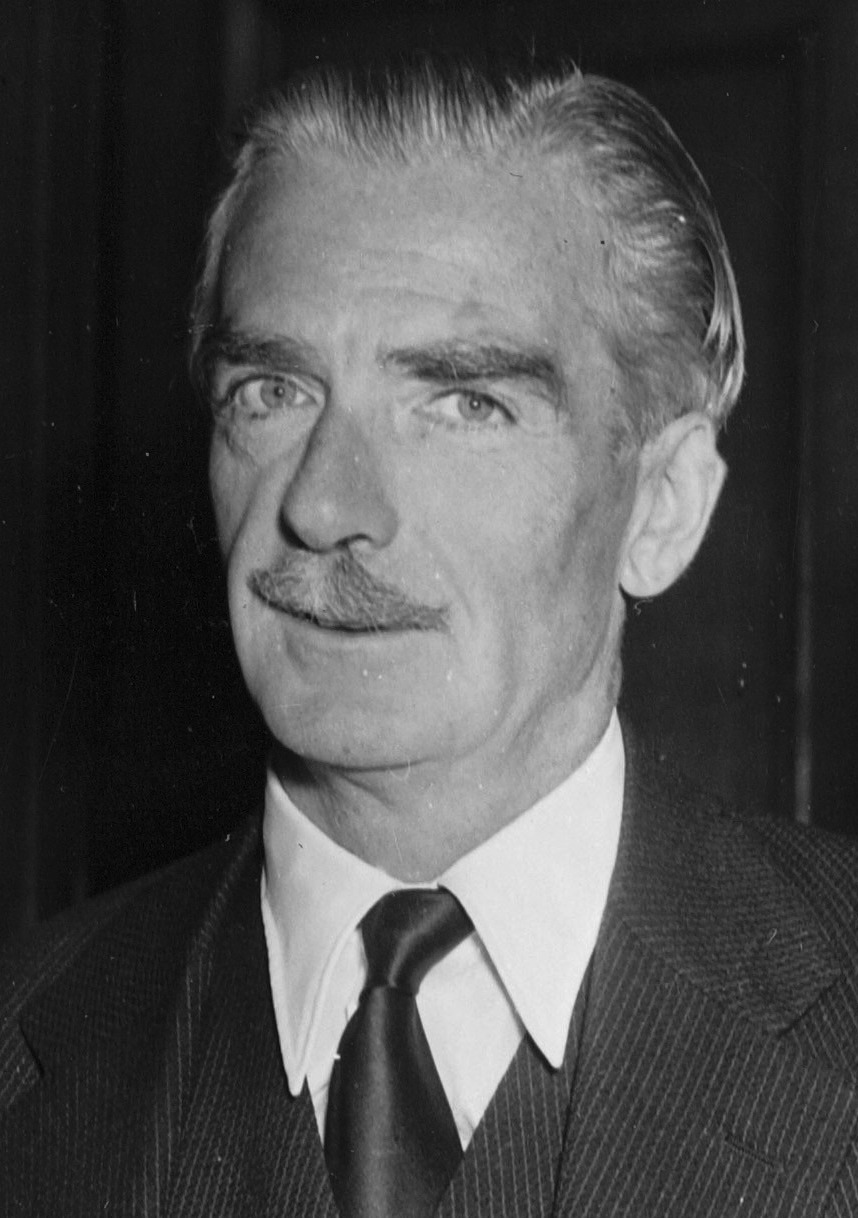
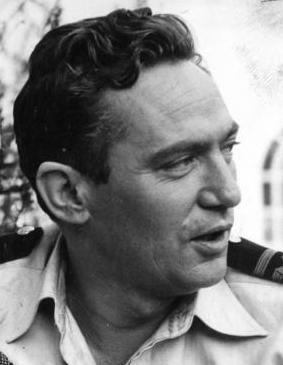
Anthony Eden, Peter Finch
- Died:
  - Sir Anthony Eden, 79, Prime Minister of the United Kingdom from 1955 to 1957
  - Peter Finch, 60, English-born Australian film star and posthumous winner of the Academy Award for Best Actor, died of a heart attack. Finch, who had achieved success as the star of the 1976 motion picture Network, collapsed as he was walking into the Beverly Hills Hotel, where he was preparing to meet Network director Sidney Lumet in advance of the pair's live appearance on a Los Angeles TV talk show. The night before, Finch had appeared as a guest of Johnny Carson on The Tonight Show.
  - Anaïs Nin, 73, French-born American diarist and novelist known for her series of journals covering 62 years of her daily observations

== January 15, 1977 (Saturday) ==
- The U.S. Data Encryption Standard, designed by the IBM Corporation as a 56-bit symmetric-key algorithm for the encryption of digital data was approved for use by all federal agencies for unclassified data. DES would remain the standard for 25 years before being replaced by the Advanced Encryption Standard.
- In Sweden, all 22 people on Linjeflyg Flight 618 were killed when the Vickers Viscount crashed as it was approaching its scheduled destination of Stockholm. The airliner had taken off earlier from Jönköping on the final leg of a multi-stop flight that originated in Kristianstad. Because of ice formation on the stabilizer, the Viscount made a vertical dive from an altitude of 1,150 feet (350 m) and plunged into a parking lot in Stockholm's Kälvesta neighborhood.
- The Cypriot cargo ship Sigrid, having arrived from Bordeaux and transporting machines intended for a factory in Serbia, sank in front of the Port of Rijeka after a strong scirocco blew it into the breakwater.
- Born: Giorgia Meloni, the first woman to serve as Prime Minister of Italy, incumbent since 2022; in Rome
- Died: Hans Alser, 24, Swedish table tennis player and 1967 doubles world champion, was killed in the Linjeflyg plane crash.

== January 16, 1977 (Sunday) ==
- In the west African nation of Benin, Bob Denard, a French soldier of fortune, led a group of fellow mercenary soldiers in "Opération Crevette", an attempt to overthrow President Mathieu Kérékou. The operation, financed by Benin's neighbors in the nations of Togo, the Ivory Coast, Gabon and Morocco, was prepared to install former Dahomey/Benin president Émile Zinsou to power.
- The cold wave of January 1977 began, causing record low temperatures across the United States and other portions of the Western Hemisphere, setting records that would still stand nearly half of a century later. In Florida, where a low of 10 °F (−12 °C) was measured in Pensacola, the record cold caused two billion dollars in damage at the time (equivalent to almost $10 billion in 2023). In Atlanta in Georgia, a low of 1 °F (−17 °C) was measured on January 17, while in Ohio, Cincinnati had a low of −25 °F (−32 °C). In China, a record low of −10.1 °C (14 °F) was seen in Shanghai on January 31. The cold wave would dissipate on January 21, but would be followed on January 28 by the Blizzard of 1977.
- The driver of a bus and 41 passengers were killed in the Mexican city of Tlalnepantla de Baz after the driver tried to reach a railroad crossing ahead of an oncoming train. Most of the victims were residents of Santa Cecilia Acatitlan who were on their way to markets in Mexico City.
- Died: K. C. S. Paniker, 65, Indian abstract painter

== January 17, 1977 (Monday) ==
- Gary Gilmore became the first person to be legally executed in the United States since the restoration of the death penalty in U.S. states, and the first since Luis Monge on June 2, 1967. Gilmore, who had murdered gas station employee Max Jensen and motel manager Bennie Bushnell in June, 1976, was brought before a firing squad at the Utah State Prison in Draper, Utah. He was taken to a former cannery and strapped to a chair. At 8:07 in the morning local time, five local police officers, armed with .30-30-caliber rifles and all volunteers, fired at Gilmore's chest from a distance of 20 feet (6.1 m) and killed him.
- A U.S. Navy LCM-6, transporting 124 U.S. Marines and U.S. Navy members from Barcelona back to their ships, USS Trenton and USS Guam, sailed into the path of the Spanish freighter Urlea and was capsized in Spain's Barcelona harbor. Spanish tugboats saved at least 12 men by setting the launch ship upright. Forty-nine enlisted Marines and sailors were killed.
- The white-minority government of the Rhodesia hanged eight black nationalists in Salisbury after finding them guilty of urban terrorism and sabotage.
- Michigan became the first U.S. state to permit lawyers to run advertisements beyond their regular telephone directory listings, as the Michigan Supreme Court approved changes to the state's Code of Professional Responsibility.
- Born: Leigh Whannell, Australian film screenwriter and director; in Melbourne

== January 18, 1977 (Tuesday) ==
- Australia's worst railway disaster killed 83 people and injured 213 at Granville, New South Wales, a suburb of Sydney. The commuter train was hauling eight passenger cars from Mount Victoria to Sydney when it derailed at 8:09 a.m. and struck a pillar supporting the Bold Street overpass. The bridge, and the motor vehicles on it, collapsed on top of the third and fourth railway cars.
- Džemal Bijedić, the Prime Minister of Yugoslavia (as President of the Federal Executive Council), was killed in a plane crash along with his wife and six other people. Bijedić had taken off from Belgrade on a flight to Sarajevo in bad weather in a Learjet 25 that flew into the side of a mountain near Kreševo.
- Led by microbiologist Joseph McDade, scientists at the U.S. Centers for Disease Control announced that they had identified a previously unknown strain of bacteria as the cause of the mysterious Legionnaires' disease that had killed 34 people at the 1976 national convention of the American Legion. The bacterium was subsequently named Legionella pneumophila.
- The Trident submarine-launched ballistic missile, designed to carry multiple nuclear warheads, was successful in its first test. Sent up from a launching pad in Cape Canaveral in Florida, rather than from a submarine, the unarmed missile traveled almost 4,600 miles (7,400 km) to a point in the South Atlantic Ocean near Ascension Island.
- The government of Syria used deception to arrest the entire leadership of the Lebanese Arab Army, a Muslim faction of officers and soldiers who had which had broken away from the Army of Lebanon in 1976 during the Lebanese Civil War. Leaders Mustafa Hamdan, Ahmed Al-Khatib, Ghazi Ghotaymi, Youssif Manssour, and Ahmad Addam were all invited to a meeting with Syria's President Hafez al-Assad in Damascus, and then arrested an imprisoned as soon as they crossed from Lebanon into Syria. They would remain in prison for almost two years before being conditionally released on October 8, 1978.
- Died:
  - Luciano Re Cecconi, 28, Italian footballer, midfielder of the Lazio team and for Italy's national soccer football team as a midfielder, was shot to death by a jewelry store manager in Rome, after Cecconi and a teammate were posing as armed robbers for a practical joke.
  - Carl Zuckmayer, 80, German playwright

== January 19, 1977 (Wednesday) ==
- All 11 people on board an Ejército del Aire airplane were killed in Spain when the CASA C-207C Azor crashed into the side of a mountain near Chiva during its approach to Valencia.

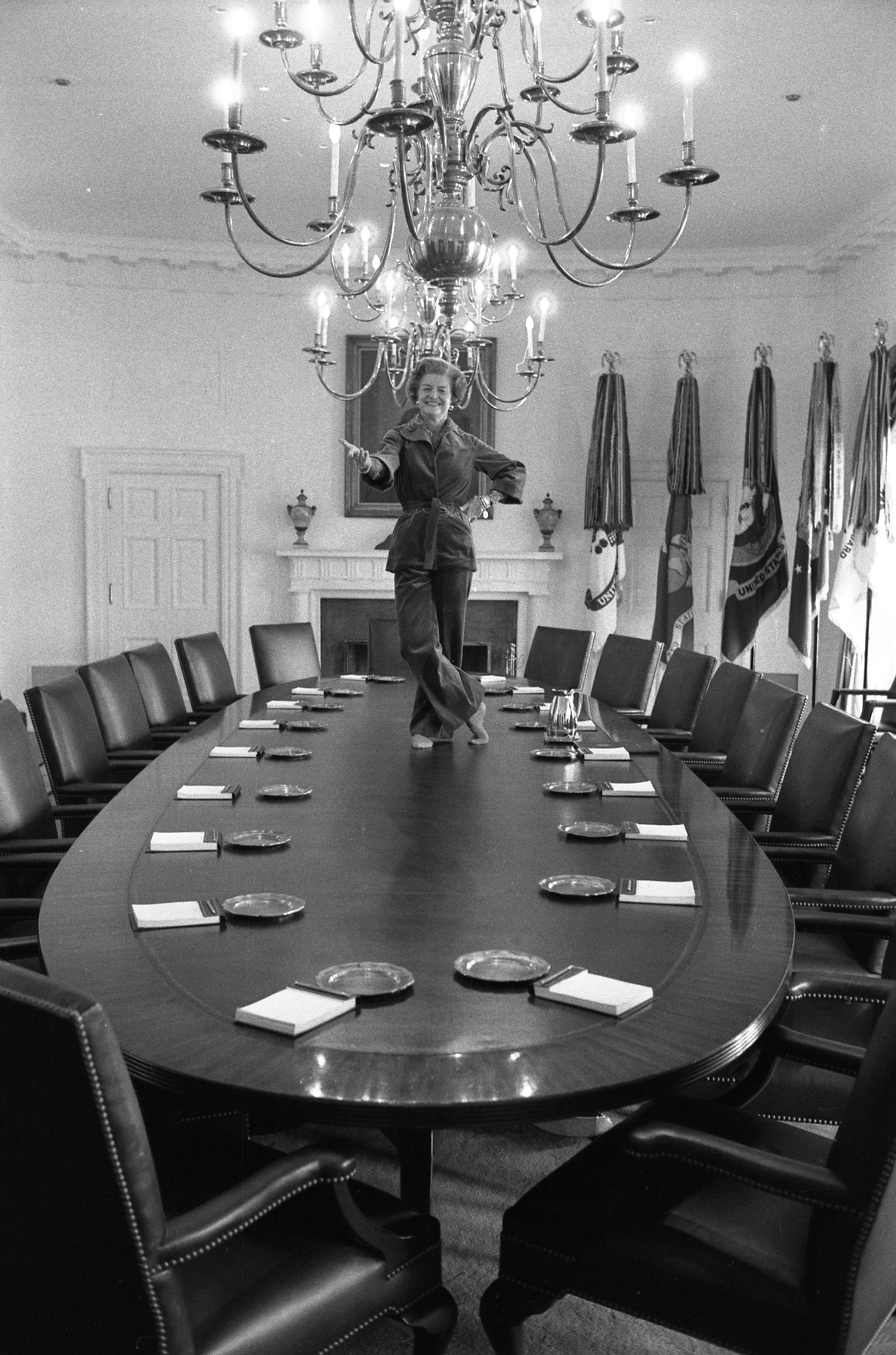
First Lady Betty Ford

- On her last full day as First Lady of the United States, Betty Ford used her training as a former dancer and jumped from a chair onto the conference table in the Cabinet Room of the White House, while official photographer David Hume Kennerly took pictures. Mrs. Ford had been a student of choreographer Martha Graham in the 1940s. The photo remained private until Kennerly received permission to include it in his autobiography in 1989.
- On his last full day in office, U.S. President Gerald R. Ford issued a presidential pardon to Iva Toguri D'Aquino, a U.S.citizen who had broadcast English language propaganda from Japan to American troops. Mixing misinformation and opinion between popular American songs played on the radio, she was one of several people to earn the nickname "Tokyo Rose" from troops. Following World War II, D'Aquino, had her U.S. citizenship revoked and served six years in prison after being convicted of treason following the war. Her citizenship was restored as part of the pardon.
- With record cold temperatures across the eastern United States, snow fell in Miami, Florida, for the first time in the history of the city. However, because snow was not observed from any of the city's National Weather Service recording stations, the event remained unofficial.
- Died: Yvonne Printemps, 82, French singer, stage and film actress

== January 20, 1977 (Thursday) ==
- Jimmy Carter was sworn in as the 39th President of the United States. Carter began his address by acknowledging the outgoing president, Republican Gerald Ford, by saying "For myself and for our Nation, I want to thank my predecessor for all he has done to heal our land." During the inaugural parade from the U.S. Capitol to the White House, the new President and First Lady Rosalynn Carter got out of their limousine and walked the rest of the way.
- India's Prime Minister Indira Gandhi declared a partial end to 19 months of dictatorial rule during her 1975 proclamation of a national emergency. Gandhi ordered the release of most political prisoners incarcerated without trial under the Maintenance of Internal Security Act. Gandhi also announced the lifting of press censorship and a revocation of a ban on public rallies.
- At Zamboanga City, Philippine Navy Rear Admiral Romulo Espaldon and Moro National Liberation Front representative Tham Manjoorsa signed a ceasefire agreement to end fighting in the Moro conflict on the island of Mindanao. The ceasefire gollowed the signing of the 1976 Tripoli Agreement on December 23.
- A joint Commission of scholars from the Roman Catholic Church and the Church of England published a proposal to reunite the Catholic and Anglican churches to end a schism that had started in 1534.
- A court in Portsmouth in England published the will of Ernest Digweed after it was probated, directing that Digweed's net estate of £26,107 (equivalent at the time to US$44,000) would be held in trust until as late as the year 2057 to be paid to Jesus Christ if the Second Coming (the Christian belief of the return of Jesus to Earth) occurred within 80 years after probate, along with a provision that he money be invested for 21 years before any income could be dispersed. Digweed had died at the age of 81 on September 20, 1976; 21 years and a day after Digweed's death, the Portsmouth Public Trustee would turn over all income from the Trust to the office of the Chancellor of the Exchequer.
- Born: Melody (stage name for Natalie T'Sobbel Lefebvre), Belgian pop singer; in Ronse, East Flanders
- Died:
  - Snehalata Reddy, 44, Indian stage and film actress, died from a lung infection five days after being released from India's Bangalore Central Jail, where she had been held for eight months as a political prisoner of the Indira Gandhi "national emergency".
  - Dimitrios Kiousopoulos, 84, Prime Minister of Greece in 1952

== January 21, 1977 (Friday) ==
- On his first full day in office, U.S. President Carter signed Executive Order 11967, granting an unconditional presidential pardon to the 570,000 men who had evaded draft notices during the Vietnam War. The law did not offer amnesty to deserters from the military.
- Italy's Chamber of Deputies approved "one of Western Europe's most liberal abortion bills" by a vote of 310 to 296, allowing a pregnant woman the final choice on abortion during the first trimester of pregnancy. The measure still required approval by the Italian Senate.
- Mexico lifted its ban against citizens band radios, and allowed visitors driving from the U.S. to bring their CB radios with them. Previously, tourists had been required to leave the radios at the border prior to entering Mexico. The Mexican Department of Tourism announced also that its "Green Angels" service of highway patrols were equipped with CB radios to receive emergency calls from vehicles on the highway.
- At Olympic Auditorium in Los Angeles, world welterweight boxing champion Carlos Palomino defended his WBC title against U.S. champion Armando Muñíz. The meeting marked the first-ever title bout in boxing between two college graduates. After 14 evenly-matched rounds, Palomino defeated Muñíz in a technical knockout in the 15th round.
- Born:
  - Jerry Trainor, American TV actor known for iCarly; in San Diego
  - Loïc Lerouge, French sprinter
- Died: John La Gatta, 82, Italian-born American advertising illustrator

== January 22, 1977 (Saturday) ==
- Kenya Airways, the national airline of the African nation of Kenya, was founded after the 31-year old East African Airways (EAA) ceased operations. EAA had been operated jointly by the governments of Kenya, Tanzania and Uganda until relations among the three countries worsened and the EAA assets were divided.
- A railway accident in Bolivia killed 19 people and injured 30 after a locomotive raced out of control while attempting to make a steep descent from the station at Banderani (at an altitude of 16,000 feet (4,900 m) on its way to Cochabamba. The brakes of the pulling locomotive failed and pulled the cars behind it off of the tracks.
- Born: Hidetoshi Nakata, Japanese footballer with 77 appearances for the Japan national team; in Kōfu, Yamanashi Prefecture
- Died:
  - Pascual Pérez, 50, Argentine boxer who was world flyweight champion from 1954 to 1960, as well as being a 1948 Olympic gold medalist, died of kidney failure.
  - Jason Moyo, 49, founder and leader of the Zimbabwe People's Revolutionary Army, was assassinated by a parcel bomb that had been mailed to the Lusaka office of the African National Congress.

== January 23, 1977 (Sunday) ==
- Six of the 12 crew of the Austrian freighter Lucona were killed by a time bomb planted on orders of Austrian businessman Udo Proksch, who sank the ship in order to make a claim for $18 million of insurance. The Lucona scandal would eventually unravel with the conviction of Proksch for murder, and the indictments of former Defense Minister Karl Lütgendorf, Foreign Affairs Minister Leopold Gratz and Finance Minister Hannes Androsch.
- Primitivo "Tibo" Mijares, a reporter and former aide to Philippine President Ferdinand Marcos, boarded a helicopter in Guam along with General Fabian Ver, ostensibly to fly to the Philippines. Mijares was never seen in public again. Mijares had testified before a U.S. House of Representatives subcommittee against Marcos in 1975 and published a book, The Conjugal Dictatorship of Ferdinand and Imelda Marcos, prior to his disappearance.
- At the request of Prime Minister Indira Gandhi, India's President Fakhruddin Ali Ahmed dissolved the Lok Sabha parliament and scheduled parliamentary elections. On the same day, Gandhi released all political prisoners jailed during her administration.
- Rafaela Porras Ayllón, a Spanish Catholic nun who established the Handmaids of the Sacred Heart of Jesus, was canonized as a saint by Pope Paul VI.
- Born: Andrei Melyukh, Soviet serial killer; in Kanashevo, Russian SFSR, Soviet Union
- Died: Bernard "Toots" Shor, 73, American restaurateur

== January 24, 1977 (Monday) ==
- Five activists from the Communist Party of Spain (PCE) and the Comisiones Obreras labor union were killed by right-wing extremists in the "Massacre of Atocha", an attack on the Spanish Communist Party headquarters located at 55 Calle de Atocha in Madrid. The attack, and others like it, came during the Spanish transition to democracy, 14 months after the death of Francisco Franco.
- On the British television soap opera Coronation Street, the role of "Tracy Barlow" was created with an episode featuring her birth. The Tracy Barlow character, one of the longest-running fictional persons, has continued for more than 45 years, with the exception of the 1984–85 season and the 2000 and 2001 seasons, and portrayed by four actresses.
- Born: Luciano D'Alessandro, Venezuelan-born Colombian TV actor and star of multiple telenovelas, including La ley del corazón; in El Tigre
- Died:
  - Eli Lilly, 91, American pharmaceutical corporation owner and philanthropist
  - Lee Parry (stage name for Mathilde Charlotte Benz), 76, German silent film actress

== January 25, 1977 (Tuesday) ==
- Khoy Thoun, who had become the Finance Minister of Democratic Kampuchea after the Khmer Rouge takeover of Cambodia, became the highest-ranking casualty of the Khmer Rouge's reign of terror, when he was arrested on the orders of Kampuchean leader Pol Pot on charges of immorality and being a "revisionist". Public Works Minister Tauch Phoeun was arrested the next day. Khoy Thoun, his wife and seven children were incarcerated at the S-21 Concentration Camp and later executed.
- The English punk rock band The Clash, fronted by guitarist and lead vocalist John Mellor, was signed to CBS Records for £100,000 (equivalent to £600,000 in 2023) despite having played only 30 appearances and mostly as the opening act for another band.
- The Japanese pop music duo Pink Lady (Mitsuyo "Mie" Nemoto and Keiko "Kei" Masuda) released their debut album, Pepper Keibu, which included the songs "Pepper Keibu" and "S.O.S".
- Born:
  - Hatem Trabelsi, Tunisian footballer and right-back with 66 appearances for the Tunisia national team and long-time star for Ajax Amsterdam; in Ariana
  - Christian Ingebrigtsen, Norwegian singer and guitarist for the British-Norwegian group A1; in Oslo
- Died: Phyllis Ackerman, 83, American art historian and editor of the six-volume A Survey of Persian Art

== January 26, 1977 (Wednesday) ==
- The Aboriginal Land Rights Act 1976 (officially "An Act providing for the granting of Traditional Aboriginal Land in the Northern Territory for the benefit of Aboriginals, and for other purposes" went into effect in Australia's Northern Territory as the first Australia's first federal law to recognize the Aboriginal Australian system of land ownership by occupying of the land. The Act also made official the concept of inalienable freehold title based on inheritance of occupied territory.
- The German feminist magazine EMMA, founded by Alice Schwarzer, published its first issue.
- Born:
  - Vince Carter, American NBA basketball forward for 22 seasons in four different decades, 1999 Rookie of the Year; in Daytona Beach, Florida
  - Preslav Nakov, Bulgarian computer scientist; in Veliko Turnovo
- Died:
  - Dietrich von Hildebrand, 87, Italian-born German Roman Catholic theologian
  - Laurence Merrick, 50, American film director, was shot and killed in the parking lot of the acting school that he had founded. Although the Manson Family was suspected because of Merrick's directing of the 1973 documentary Manson, a mentally ill acting student would confess to the murder in 1981.

== January 27, 1977 (Thursday) ==
- Dagmar Hagelin, a 17-year-old Swedish citizen who had been born in Argentina, was seized by Argentine security forces while visiting the Buenos Aires suburb of El Palomar. She became one of the 30,000 desaparecidos during the South American nation's "Dirty War" that followed the overthrow of the Peronist government by the military, and never seen again in public. Argentine Navy Commander Alfredo Astiz, nicknamed "The Blonde Angel of Death" (El Ángel Rubio de la Muerte), shot and wounded Hagelin after mistaking her for a terrorist, and she was subsequently taken to ESMA, an officers' school, tortured to death and then murdered. Astiz would be charged with the murder of multiple desaparecidos in 2005 and sentenced to life imprisonment in 2011. Hagelin's body was never found.
- Gunvor Galtung Haavik, an employee of the Norwegian Ministry of Foreign Affairs who had worked as the secretary to Norway's Ambassador to the Soviet Union from 1947 to 1955, was arrested after 21 years by Norwegian security police. She had been identified as a partner in crime by Soviet spy Oleg Gordievsky.
- Within Vatican City, the Sacred Congregation of the Doctrine of the Faith issued a 19-page declaration, approved by Pope Paul VI, ruling that women would not be allowed to serve as priests within the Roman Catholic Church. The document concluded, "The Catholic Church has never felt that priestly or episcopal ordination can be validly conferred on women."

== January 28, 1977 (Friday) ==
- The Palace of Europe was inaugurated in France at Strasbourg as the permanent meeting place of the Council of Europe, which had 19 member nations at the time. The new structure, designed by Henry Bernard, became the seat for the European Court of Human Rights, as well as the Council's Committee of Foreign Ministers and of the Council's Parliamentary Assembly.
- A fire killed 17 of the 18 people at the Stratford Hotel in Breckenridge, Minnesota. Most of the victims were guests who had decided to spend the night because of a storm that had dropped temperatures to −20 °F (−29 °C), with 40 miles per hour (64 km/h) winds producing a wind chill factor of −80 °F (−62 °C).
- The Italian Parliament approved the nation's strict Land Use Law, regulating construction, land acquisition and developmental procedures.
- The 1974 murder conviction of former United Mine Workers president Tony Boyle was overturned by the Pennsylvania Supreme Court and a new trial was ordered. Boyle would be convicted on retrial in 1978.
- The Shining, the horror novel and the first hardcover bestseller by Stephen King, is published.
- Born: Takuma Sato, Japanese race car driver who won the Indianapolis 500 in 2017 and 2020; in Tokyo
- Died: Burt Mustin, 94, American character actor known for portraying elderly men on television and on film. The acting career of Mustin, who had retired from being a car dealer, began when he was 67 years old, and he was seen in 350 television episodes and 85 movies.

== January 29, 1977 (Saturday) ==
- An Italian parliamentary commission indicted Mario Tanassi, who had been defense minister in 1970 and 1972, on charges of involvement in the Lockheed bribery scandal, along with Tanassi's predecessor as defense minister, Luigi Gui. By a margin of one vote, a tiebreaker by the president of the Commission, an indictment was not returned on former Prime Minister Mariano Rumor.
- Serial killer Velma Barfield, a caretaker for elderly people in Lumberton, North Carolina, committed the first of four poisonings of her patients in slightly more than a year, starting with Montgomery Edwards. His widow, Dolly, died of similar symptoms on March 1 and Barfield began working for two other people, John Henry Lee (June 4) and Rowland Taylor, who died on February 3, 1978. Barfield would be arrested in May. Also suspected of killing her second husband and her mother, she would be convicted of the murder of Taylor. On November 2, 1984, she would become the first person in the U.S. to be legally executed by lethal injection, a form of poisoning.

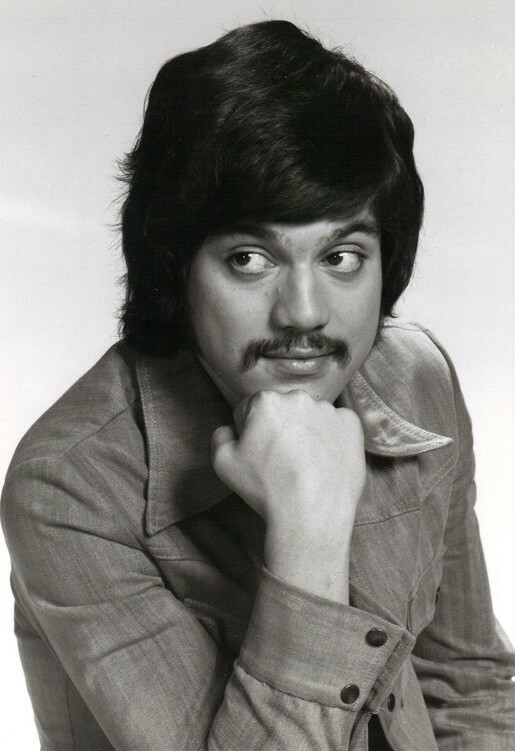
Prinze

- Died: Freddie Prinze, 22, American comedian, TV actor and co-star of the hit show Chico and the Man, died one day after he shot himself. The final episode in which Prinze appeared, videotaped hours before he shot himself, would air on March 4, 1977.

== January 30, 1977 (Sunday) ==
- The eighth and concluding episode of the ABC miniseries Roots was watched in an estimated 36,380,000 U.S. households and over 100 million viewers, becoming the most-watched TV episode up to that time. As of 2023, the record has been exceeded only by the final episode of M*A*S*H, watched on February 28, 1983, by 105.9 million people.
- Soldiers from the Zimbabwe African People's Union (ZAPU) invaded the Rhodesian village of Manama, 15 miles (24 km) from the border with Botswana and took with them 380 black African schoolchildren and eight adults from the Manama Lutheran Mission school in . Five boys were able to escape and give the news of the kidnapping of most of the 230 girls and 170 boys. On February 6, a group of 140 black Rhodesian parents were allowed to visit the estimated 380 teenagers being held in Francistown in Botswana. Only 52 of the youths agreed to leave.

== January 31, 1977 (Monday) ==
- Named for the late President of France, the Centre Pompidou, France's national museum of art and culture, was opened in Paris. A collaborative work of architects Richard Rogers, Su Rogers, Renzo Piano, and Gianfranco Franchini, the Centre Pompidou was the first 'inside-out' building with its structural system, mechanical systems, and circulation exposed on the exterior of the building, and would be described 30 years later as a design that "turned the architecture world upside down."
- In the U.S., construction was ordered halted on the Tellico Dam in Tennessee because of the danger posed to an endangered species of fish, the snail darter. The U.S. Sixth Circuit Court of Appeals reversed a lower court decision and reinstated a permanent injunction. In 1979, after relocation of snail darters to another site, Congress would pass legislation exempting the Tellico Dam from the Endangered Species Act.
- Secured to a specially-made trailer, the space shuttle Enterprise was towed out of the Rockwell International assembly plant in Palmdale, California, by an equally elaborate truck to make its first trip, a 36 miles (58 km) trek to the NASA Research Center at Edwards Air Force Base. The distance took 8 hours and 35 minutes as the shuttle was moved at an average speed of 3.5 miles per hour (5.6 km/h) through the streets of Palmdale and Lancaster, where power lines, traffic signals and light poles had been removed to provide the 60 feet (18 m) clearance needed.
- With only three teams left after four others folded during the 1976–77 season, the Southern Hockey League ceased operations. The ambitious attempt to bring ice hockey to the southeastern United States ended with a game between the first-place Hampton (VA) Gulls and the fourth-place Baltimore Clippers. The other team, the third-place Charlotte (NC) Checkers, had played against Baltimore the day before.
- Born: Kerry Washington, American TV and film actress and star of the ABC drama Scandal; in New York City
