= Permanent representative =

Head of a diplomatic mission to an international organisation

A permanent representative is a diplomat who is the head of a country's diplomatic mission to an international organisation.

Organizations that receive permanent representatives from their member states include the United Nations, the World Trade Organization, NATO, the European Union, the African Union, the Organisation of Islamic Cooperation, and the Organization of American States. Permanent representatives can be sent to subunits or field offices of an organization. For example, in addition to the permanent representatives sent to the United Nations headquarters in New York City, UN member states also appoint permanent representatives to other UN offices, such as those in Geneva, Nairobi, and Vienna.

Permanent representatives are often informally described as ambassadors. However, although a permanent representative typically holds the diplomatic rank of an ambassador, because they are accredited to an international organisation, their official title is permanent representative. For example, the United States ambassador to the United Nations is technically called the permanent representative to the UN, even though they are widely referred to as an ambassador.

Diplomatic representatives of the pope are titled apostolic nuncio or papal nuncio, which is equivalent to permanent representative.

Some international organizations, such as UNESCO, use the title permanent delegate to refer to the head of a diplomatic mission accredited to them.

== See also ==
- Permanent representative to the United Nations
- List of current permanent representatives to the United Nations
- Committee of Permanent Representatives (of the European Union)
- OIC Committee of Permanent Representatives
- Ministers Deputies
- Observer status
