= Juan Jose Peruyero =

Cuban exile and activist

- Born: c. 1931; Cuba
- Died: January 8, 1977; Miami, Florida, U.S.
- Cause of death: Assassination
- Spouse: Eneida Peruyero
- Children: 2 daughters

Juan Jose Peruyero (c. 1931 – January 8, 1977) was a Cuban exile and anti-communist activist. He took part in the Bay of Pigs Invasion in 1961, and he later served as the president of its veteran association in Miami, Florida, where he was assassinated in 1977. He is the namesake of the Juan J. Peruyero Museum and Manuel F. Artime Library in Miami, also known as the Bay of Pigs Museum.

== Life ==
Peruyero was born circa 1931.

Peruyero was a member of Brigade 2506 who carried out the Bay of Pigs Invasion on April 17, 1961. He was captured by Castro's forces and imprisoned for a year. After he returned to the United States, Peruyero served as the president of the Cuban Bay of Pigs Invasion Brigade Veteran Association.

With his wife Eneida, Peruyero had two daughter, Eneidita and Nelda.

Peruyero was assassinated in Miami on January 8, 1977. He was shot in the back outside his house, and he died at the Jackson Memorial Hospital shortly after. He had been warned by Cuban exile Emilio Milián to take precautions three days earlier. In October 1977, Carlos Rivero Collado, another Bay of Pigs veteran and the son of former Cuban Prime Minister Andrés Rivero Agüero, claimed that Peruyero had been killed by the Castro regime, as were Jose Elias de la Torriente and Rolando Masferrer. By 2006, the murder was still unresolved.

The Cuban-American historian María Cristina García states that Peruyero was murdered by extremist members of his own Brigade. During the 1973-6 wave of terrorism in Miami, Peruyero had condemned the participation of fellow Brigade veterans in terrorist activities. Following his murder, a group of Brigade members responded that they would continue "all kinds of actions to fight against the communist tyranny."

Peruyero is the namesake of the Juan J. Peruyero Museum and Manuel F. Artime Library, also known as the Bay of Pigs Museum, established in Miami in 1988.

== See also ==
- Emilio Milián
