= Ministers Deputies =

Representatives of the CEC Ministers of Strasbourg

The Ministers Deputies (or Ministers' Deputies) are the representatives of the Council of Europe Committee of Ministers at Strasbourg.

While the Committee of Ministers is the executive organ of the Council of Europe, it actually only meets once year in Strasbourg, in what are known as the ministerial sessions. Its day-to-day work is carried out by the deputies, who are the permanent representatives, mostly of ambassadorial rank, the heads of their countries’ diplomatic missions in Strasbourg. So most of the time that the Committee of Ministers is quoted as having done something, it is actually the deputies who have taken the decision. Their decisions have the same weight and effect as the Committee of Ministers.

The Deputies currently meet at least once a week in plenary, usually on a Wednesday, in the great Committee of Ministers meeting room at the front of the Palace of Europe, and several times a week in committee, as one of their rapporteur groups, or ad hoc working groups. The frequency of meetings has increased considerably since 1989. They have regular special human rights meetings in their capacity of supervising the execution of the judgments of the European Court of Human Rights.

The chairmanship of the deputies changes every six months, at each session of the Committee of Ministers, following the English alphabetical order of member states. The current chair (November 2021 – May 2022) is Italy.

There is also a Bureau, set up in 1975 to assist the chairmanship, which consists of the current chair, the two previous and the three future chairpersons.

== History ==
The system of permanent representatives was set up by the Committee of Ministers in May 1951. It was the following year that they took a separate decision to appoint a deputy to whom they delegated most of the work. Legally, therefore, the deputies and the permanent representatives are distinct, although for practical purposes they are almost always the same person. While they currently all reside in Strasbourg, this is not obligatory, and Ireland and Iceland only opened missions there in the 1990s.
