= René Andrei =

French sculptor

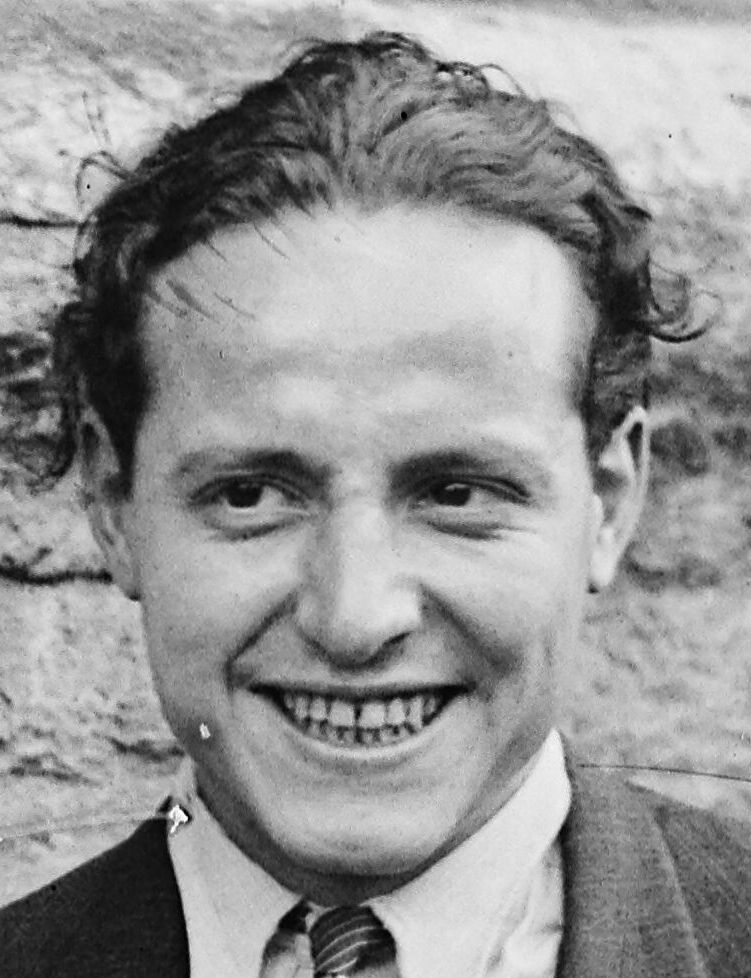
- Andrei in 1931
- Born: 25 February 1906; Paris, France
- Died: 20 August 1987 (aged 81); Arpajon, France
- Occupation: Sculptor

René Andrei (25 February 1906 – 20 August 1987) was a French sculptor.

He was son of a sculptor, educated from 1920 with Louis Aimé Lejeune and taking lessons in Montparnasse.

His work was part of the sculpture event in the art competition at the 1924 Summer Olympics. This, while he attended Beaux-Arts de Paris and received lessons from Henri Bouchard.

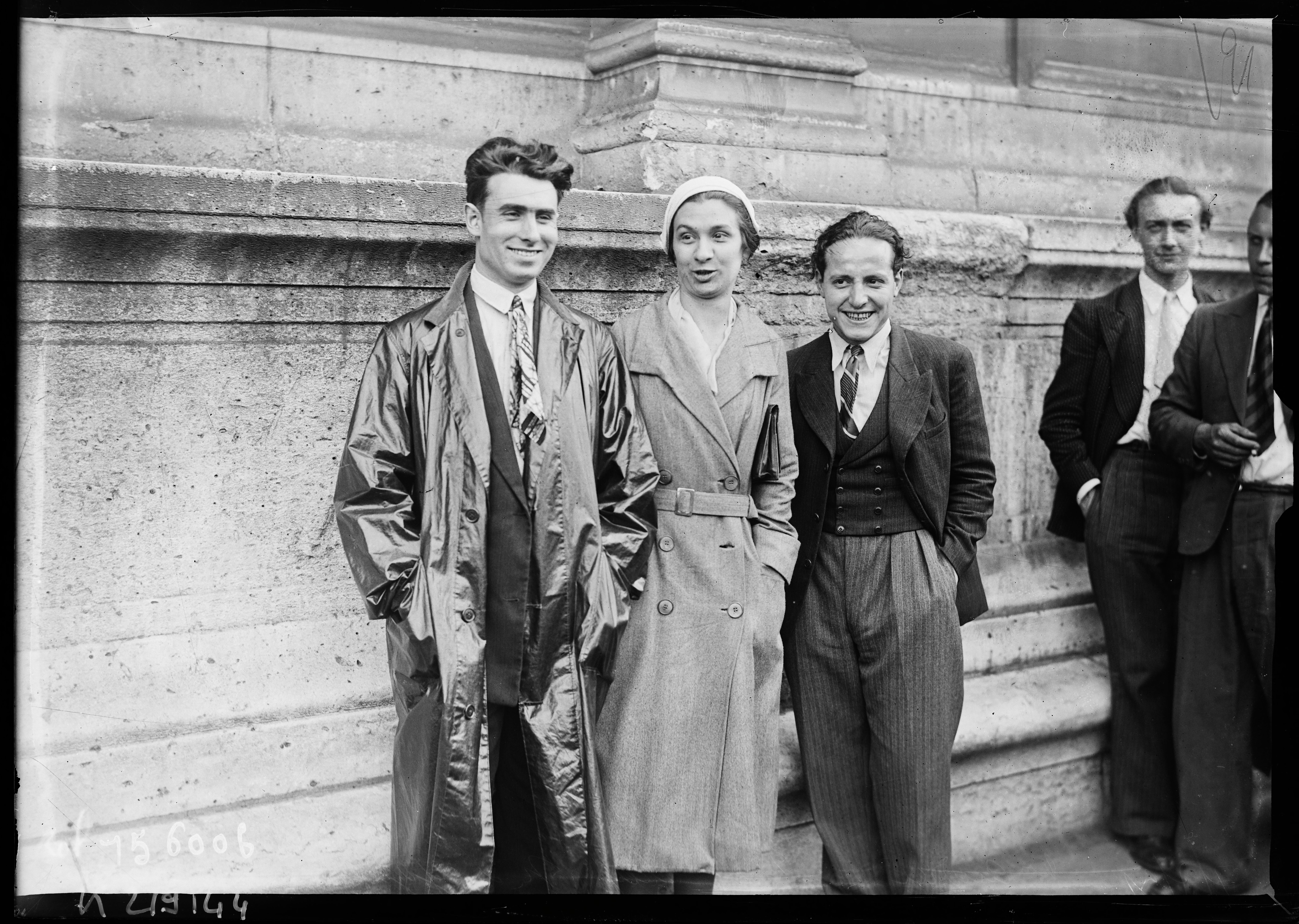
Andrei (right) shared second price with Hélène Bouley-Hue (middle) in the 1931 Prix de Rome. Winner was Louis Leygue (left)

In 1937 he won a grand prize, the Grand Prix des Arts. He was member of Société des Artistes Français, a french club for artists.

== Biography ==
René Jean Louis Andrei was born on February 25, 1906, in Paris. The son of a Parisian craftsman and sculptor, in 1920 he began attending the studio of Louis Aimé Lejeune and the drawing academies in Montparnasse.

In 1925, he received an honorable mention at the Salon des Artistes Français.

In 1926, he enrolled at the École des Beaux-Arts in Paris. He continued his artistic training during a stay in Madrid, where he was a resident at the Casa de Velázquez from 1935 to 1936.

He died on August 20, 1987, in Arpajon, and was buried at the Bagneux Cemetery in Paris (Section 28).
