= Knittelfeld =

- Municipality
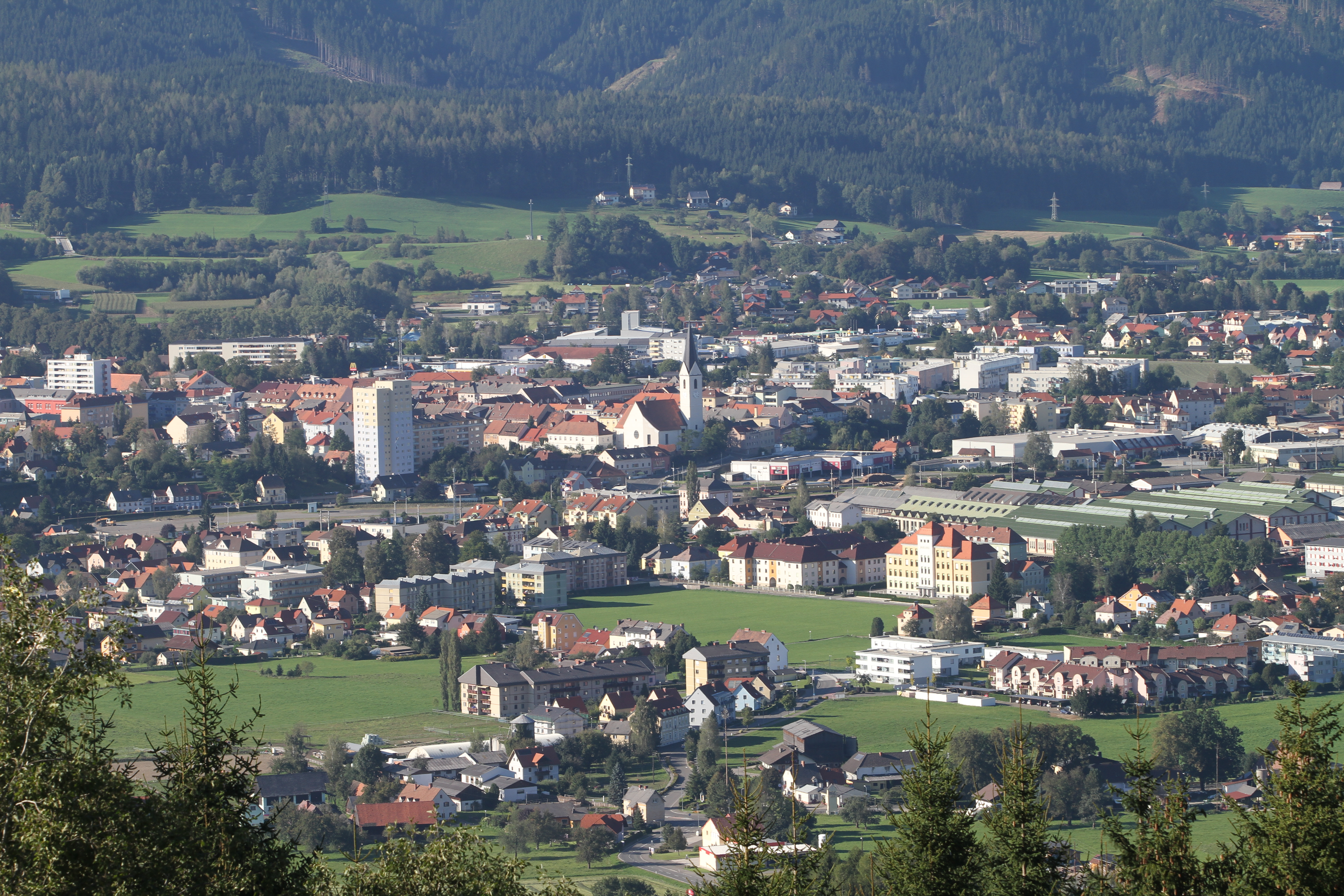

- Coat of arms

- Location within Austria
- Coordinates: 47°12′54″N 14°49′46″E
- Country: Austria
- State: Styria
- District: Murtal

Government
  - Mayor: Harald Bergmann (SPÖ)

Area
  - Total: 13.81 km^{2} (5.33 sq mi)
- Elevation: 645 m (2,116 ft)

Population (2018-01-01)
  - Total: 12,626
  - Density: 914.3/km^{2} (2,368/sq mi)
- Time zone: UTC+1 (CET)
  - Summer (DST): UTC+2 (CEST)
- Postal code: 8720
- Area code: 03512
- Vehicle registration: MT
- Website: www.knittelfeld.at

Knittelfeld (German: [ˈknitl̩ˌfɛlt]) is a city in Styria, Austria, located on the banks of the Mur river.

The name of the town has become notorious for the Knittelfeld Putsch of September 7, 2002, a party meeting of the Freedom Party of Austria, which resulted in the 2002 Austrian elections.

== Notable people ==
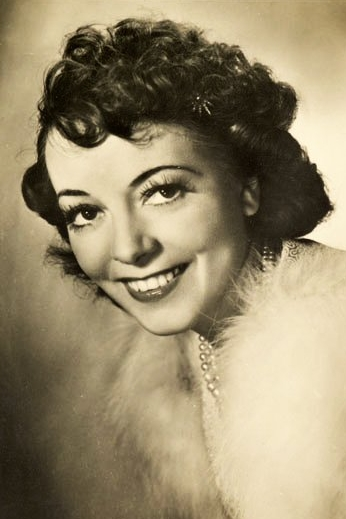
Lizzi Waldmüller

The following are past and present notable residents of Knittelfeld.

- Hermann Lichtenegger (1900–1984), resistance fighter, politician (KPÖ) and Govt. minister
- Lizzi Waldmüller (1904–1945), singer and actress
- Franz Weissmann (1911–2005), Brazilian sculptor, emigrated to Brazil aged 11, a founder of the Neo-Concrete Movement
- Karl Troll (1923–1977), politician (SPÖ)
- Gert Hofbauer (1937–2017), Austrian conductor and trumpeter

=== Sport ===
- Zoran Lerchbacher (born 1972), darts player
- Klaus Ambrosch (born 1973), decathlete
- Harald Proczyk (born 1975), racing driver
- Jürgen Saler (born 1977), a retired Austrian footballer who scored over 280 goals
- Andi Siebenhofer (born 1977), extreme sports athlete and entrepreneur
- Stefan Rucker (born 1980), former racing cyclist
- Marcel Ritzmaier (born 1993), football player, played over 240 games
