= Louis Leygue =

French sculptor and painter

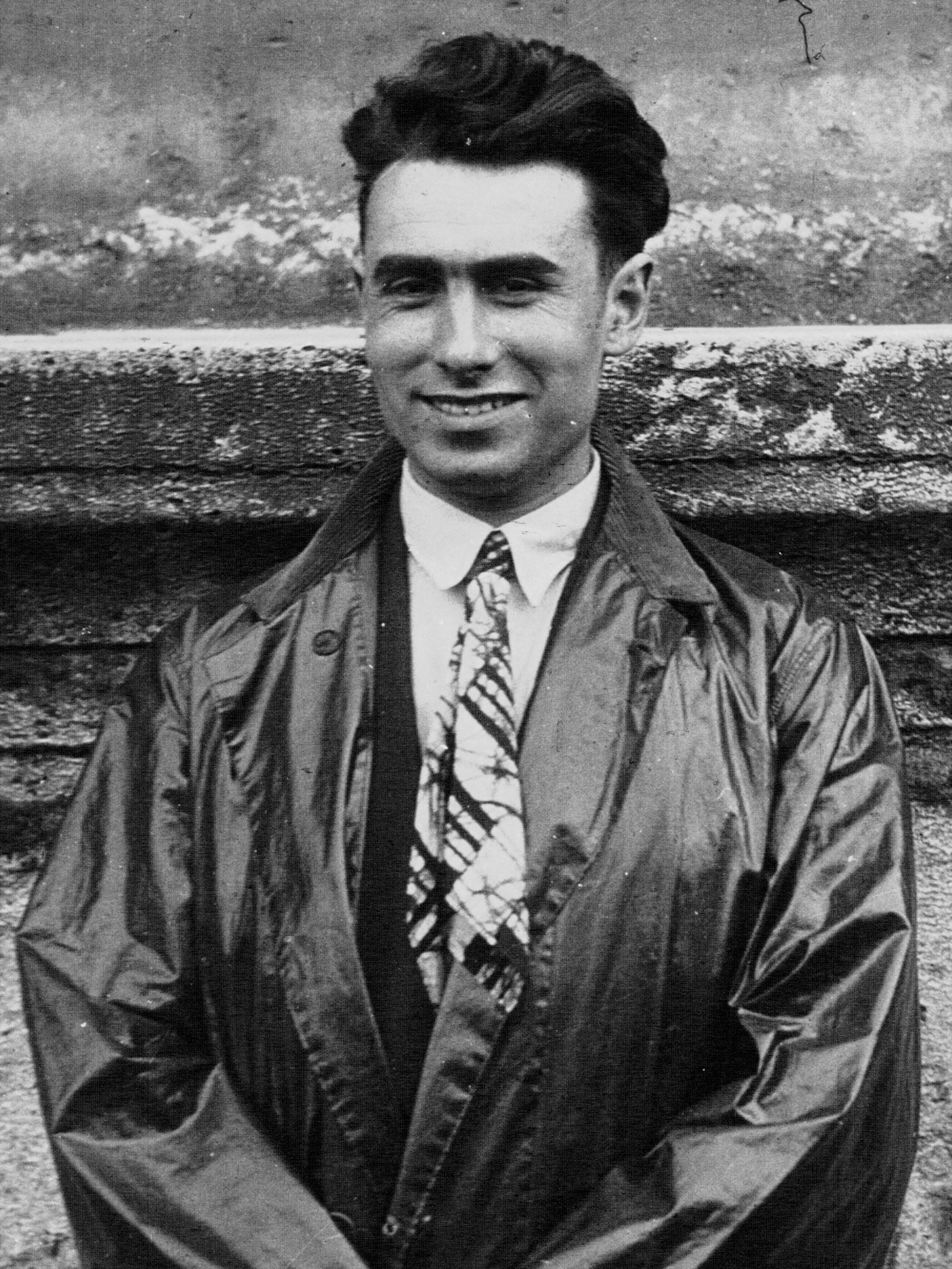
- Leygue in 1931
- Born: 25 August 1905; Bourg-en-Bresse, France
- Died: 5 March 1992 (aged 86); Paris, France
- Occupation: Sculptor

Louis Leygue (born 25 August 1905 in Bourg-en-Bresse) was a French sculptor and painter. As a sculptor he worked in the traditional stone but also pioneered the use of various metals. He was particularly adept in depicting horses.

"La richesse d'une cité devrait pouvoir s'évaluer au nombre de ses statues"

— Leygue

== Biography ==
Early studies were at the Lycée Charlemagne and in 1921 he was accepted as a student by the École Germain Pilon and studied under Robert Wlérick. In 1923 he was accepted by the Ếcole Supérieure des Arts Décoratifs and entered the studio of Jules Coutan at the École Nationale des Beaux Arts. Sickness then interrupted his studies for two years but in 1926 he was back with Coutan and then studied under François-Léon Sicard. In 1928 there was another interruption to his studies when he carried out his military service at Dijon and in 1928 he returned to the École des Beaux Arts and now studied under Paul Landowski.

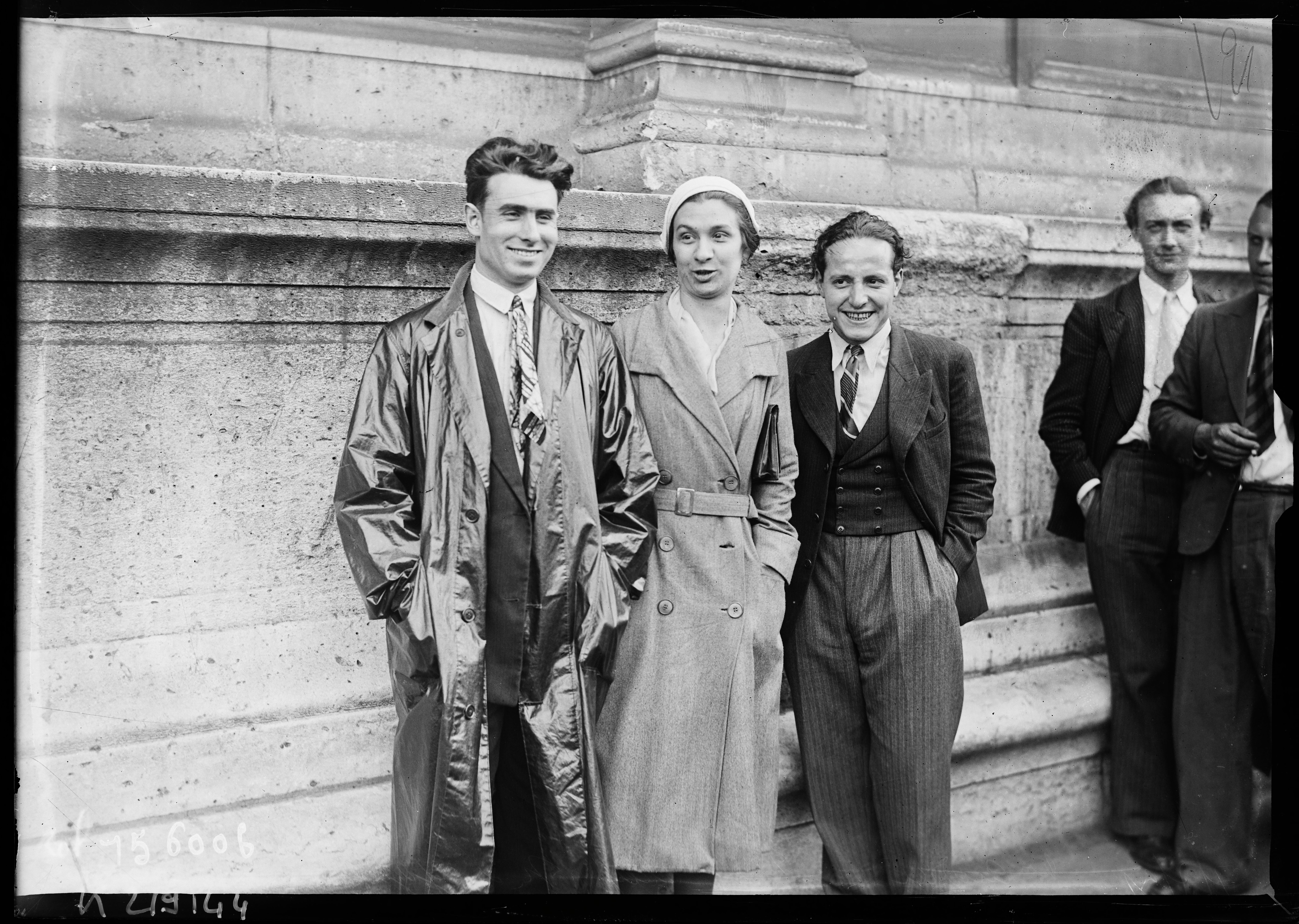
Winners of the 1931 Prix de Rome. Louis Leygue (left) won, while René Andrei (right) shared second price with Hélène Bouley-Hue (middle).

In 1930 he tried for the Prix de Rome with his attempt at that year's set subject "Tireur à l’arc". The next year he competed again, now the set subject being "Le Héros et les Jeunes Filles"' and was the winner which guaranteed him three years studying at the Villa Medicis but sadly he was taken ill again. Recovered he set off for Rome but firstly married Marianne Cochet, also a student at the École des Beaux-Arts. In 1936 once their time in Rome came to an end, the couple returned to Paris and moved into a studio in the 15th arrondissement of Paris. In 1938 he received the prestigious commission to take part in the decoration of the new French embassy being built in Ottawa. He returned to France from Canada just before the declaration of war. The war years were difficult for Leygue who got by teaching design. He was arrested by the Gestapo, imprisoned at Fresnes and sent to Germany before being transferred to a concentration camp. His health suffered badly and the experiences of this period were to leave an emotional scar.

The war over Leygue was offered and accepted the position of "Professeur Chef d’atelier de sculpture" at the Ếcole nouvelle des Beaux-Arts, and the Paris Berri gallery mounted his first exhibition of design drawings and small sculptures. A second exhibition concentrated on his studies of horses which he had spent time studying during the war years. In 1948 he created the striking monument in Nantua to the men, women and children deported by the Germans. Works in 1950 included his "Triptoleme" and in 1951 his works included "L’Enfant Martyr", the Thann war memorial, decoration of the "Salle des Traités" at the Quai d’Orsay and an equestrian statue of Rochambeau. 1954 saw Leygue made professor at the Ếcole Normale Supérieure d’Enseignement Technique and the government of Abidjan organized a tender to select the sculptor for two cariatides in wood for the "Cour d’Assises" which Leygue won. This took Leygue to West Africa and whilst there he was commissioned to execute decoration for Abidjan's town hall and the work "Jeune Afrique" for an Abidjan bridge.

During his working life, Leygue created many sculptures for schools and other educational establishments and many of these were commissioned under the so-called "1% scheme". Under this scheme and to encourage interest in and support for artists, 1% of the total funds allocated for new buildings particularly schools was put aside to commission and pay sculptors to create works.

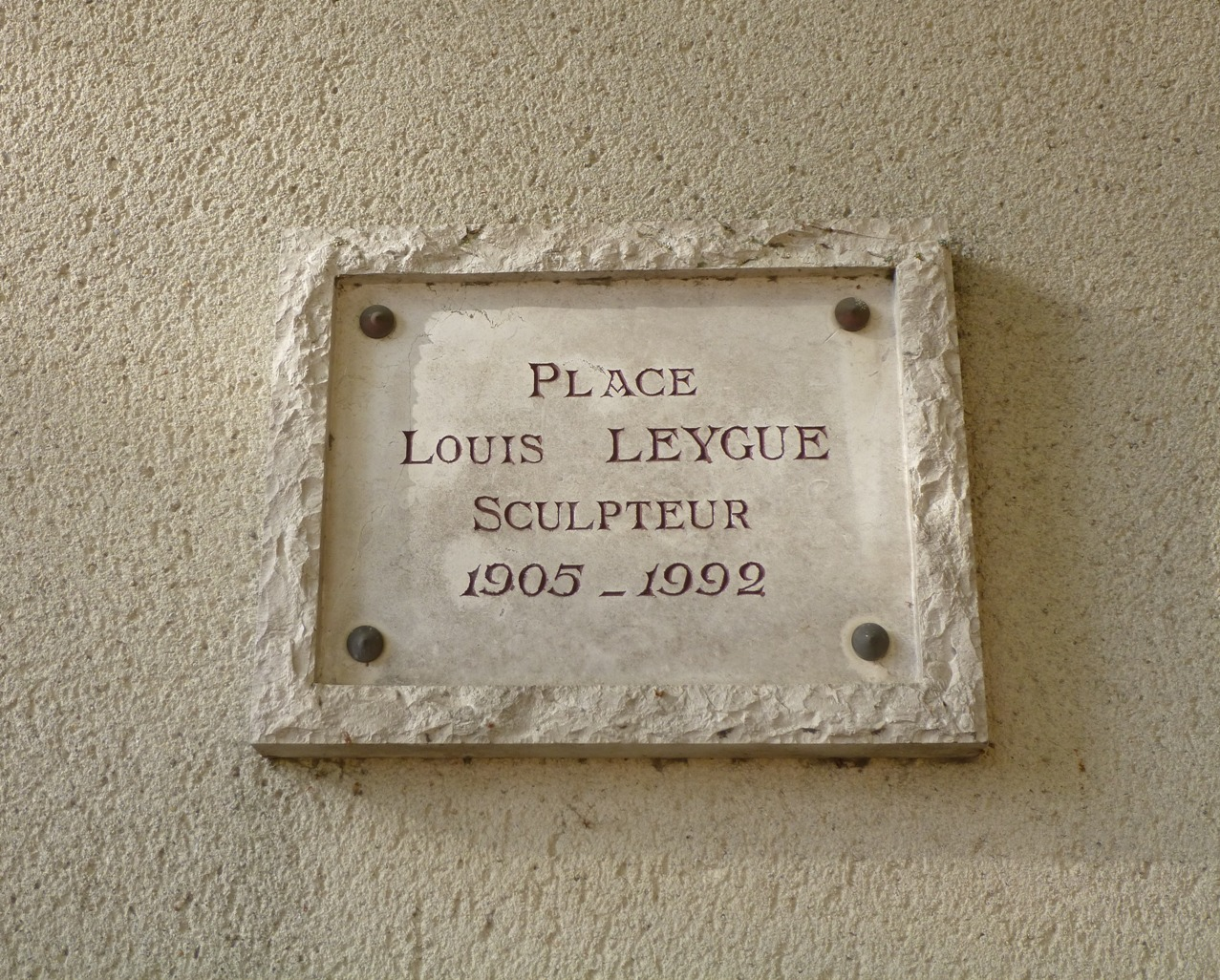
A street named in Leygue's honour in Naveil

1958 saw Leygue execute the works "Minotaure", "Cortège" and "Oiseau-Harpe". The next year saw his copper and bronze work " La Main de Prométhée" and "L’Arbre de la Science" for Saint Die and " Le Grand Cervidé" for Orléans. The École des Arts et Métiers in Paris ordered the huge work "Taureau révulsé" and two studies of a bull, both in bronze. In 1962 he was commissioned to decorate the Paris "Maison de la Radio"'s auditorium and he created "Les Bruissements de la forêt" and "Les Rumeurs de la ville". In 1966 he worked on various furnishings for Rottes church including a painted mural entitled "Les Quatre Cavaliers de l’Apocalypse" and, to celebrate the first heart transplant, the work "Le Don Du Cœur". In 1969 he was elected a member of the Académie des Beaux-Arts, and created a fountain for the Balance district in Avignon and the work "L’Envol" for Dijon. In 1971 he worked on a large fountain in Aquitaine and another called "Les Corolles du jour" in Paris' "La Defense" area. Leygue was also an accomplished medallist and produced several medallions for the French mint. In 1982 he was commissioned to create "Soleil" for Langres. In 1985 he donated a number of his works to the Musée de Vendôme and the Musée de Naviel was established. The work "Le Phare Englouti" was executed in 1987., "Le Pêcheur au carrelet" and a sculpture for the Lycée Lisbonne and in 1951 he created the work "Prisonnier Politique inconnu". Leygue died on 2 March 1992 and his main works were as follows:-

== Main works ==
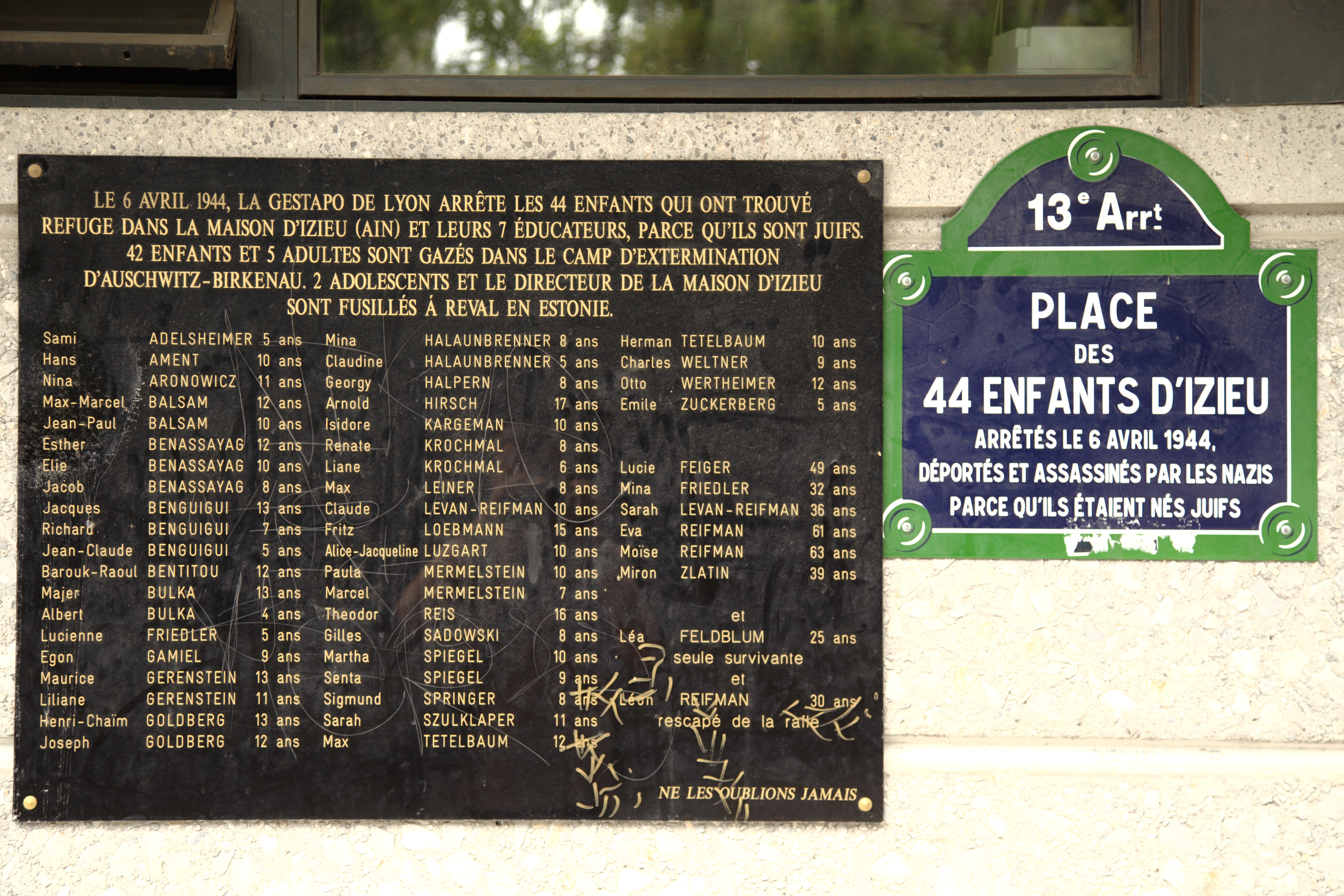
Jewish children who were victims of Gestapo barbarity

=== Work for the French embassy in Ottawa in Canada ===
In 1938, the architect Eugène Beaudouin, Prix de Rome winner, was commissioned to design the new French embassy building in Ottawa and Louis Leygue and Jean Prouvé were charged with creating the sculptural decoration involved. Leygue's work included sculptures in the "Grand Salon", positioned around a 17th-century tapestry from Gobelins depicting Constantine's victory and a reproduction of the Vimy memorial.

=== Mémorial aux Déportés de l'Ain ===
Leygue was commissioned to create this memorial to the 1400 citizens of the Ain deported by the Nazis. He sculpts the body of a dead victim encased within a large slab of stone. The memorial is located at Nantua by Lake Nantua. It lists the names of the Jewish deportees from Izieu including many children and the names of the camps to which the deportees were sent. This plaque in Izieu recounts the episode of the Jewish children.

== "Jeune Afrique". Work for a bridge in Abidjan ==
Executed in 1954-1957 after Leygue had won a tender organised by the Côte d'Ivoire government.

== "L’Astronomie" ==
This 1955 sculpture can be seen at Toulouse's Lycée Bellevue. In Leygue's composition a woman symbolizing astronomy holds a sundial in her right hand and looks to the horizon.

== "Le Prisonnier politique inconnu" ==
With this work of 1953 Leygue relived his experiences as a deportee and created similar works to explore the cruelty of the persecution of one man by another. "L’Enfant martyr" of 1946, "Le Silence" of 1946, "L' Evasion" of 1954 and "La Patrie où Varsovie" of 1946 are examples, as was the "Le Gisant de Nantua".

== "Cortège" ==
A 1957 work in bronze now in the Musée Rodin in Paris.

== La Maison de la Radio.Paris ==
This building on the banks of the Seine facing the pont de Grenelle and inaugurated in 1963 was designed by the architect Henry Bernard and the architects Jean and Édouard Niermans were subcontracted to build the "grande salle de concert", the "salle de musique" and the "salle des variétés" and for the decoration of the "grande salle de concert" they used Leygue and Raymond Stubes. Leygue executed a bas-relief and decorated the casing for the organ.

== "Fée" ==
This 1963 work is located in a school in Paris' Porte Briancon.

== "Cortège" ==
A second version of this work created in 1967/68, this copy is in the Cité Floréal district of Saint Denis.

== "Soleil & Nature" ==
A 1970 composition in Le Grand-Quevilly

== "Corolles du jour" ==
In 1971 Leygue executed this work in red copper. It forms part of a fountain in the "La Défense" area in Courbevoie

== "Le Cavalier Tombé" ==
This sculpture is located in Vendôme's Parc Ronsard.

== Equestrian statue of Louis XIV ==
Leygue was commissioned to execute a copy of Bernin's statue for the Palais Taverna in Rome

== "Le Soleil de Langres" ==
Leygue executed this work in 1982/1983 for the Société des autoroutes Lorraine-Bourgogne. The piece is in stainless steel, is 15 metres high and stands next to the Autoroute A31 near Langres/Mardor.

== Sculptures created for schools under the "1%" scheme ==
In 1951 a law was introduced whereby 1% of the total funds given for the construction of new schools would be used to fund a work of sculpture to decorate the school in question. Leygue received several such commissions included "Le renouveau" for the lycée Angellier in Boulogne-sur-Mer in 1980, "Au-dessus de la mêlée" for the lycée Romain Rolland in Ivry in 1977, "Les voiles du futur" for the lycée La Roquelle in Coutances in 1972, "Soleil et nature" for the lycée technique de Grand-Quevilly in Rouen in 1970. Further such commissions were "Le Bovidé" for the lycée agricole in Coutances in 1969,"L’appel du large" for the lycée mixte in Sables-d’Olonne in 1965, "L’enseignement audio-visuel" for the lycée d’enseignement technique in Lille in 1964, "La main de Prométhée" for the lycée technique in Toulouse in 1960, "Le Phénix" for Caen university in 1955 and "La Fontaine-Tournante" for the lycée climatique in Argelès-Gazost in 1954.

== Le Phénix ==
During the Normandy invasion, Caen was subjected to fierce fighting and aerial bombing and the ancient university was completely destroyed. The architect Henry Bernard was commissioned in 1945 to design the new university buildings and he employed Leygue and the painter Yvonne Guégan to assist in this project, which ran from 1948 to 1970. Leygue sculpted a huge depiction of a Phoenix in bronze and this stands on the university's esplanade.

== "Les Voiles du futur" ==
This work in cement was executed in 1971 and stands on the lawn in front of the lycée La Roquelle.

== Église Notre Dame des Roses ==
This church in Grisy-Suisnes was designed by the architect Anton Korady. It has stained glass by Jacques Loire and sculptures by Leygue and Maurice Calka. Building took place from 1964 to 1966.

== Reims ==
Leygue and Georges Saupique worked on creating several replacements for statues on the front of the cathedral which had been badly damaged by German artillery fire in the 1914-1918 war.

== Église Notre-Dame des Rottes in Vendôme ==
For this church Leygue worked on the altar with depictions of Christ's death and resurrection, and a copper tabernacle and in the crypt is his "Horsemen of the Apocalypse.

== Église de Saint-Auban in Alpes-Maritimes ==
In 1941 executed two sculptures in wood for this church.

== Ossuary in Pederobba ==
Leygue worked on this monumental sculpture of two seated figures representing France and Italy, sat in front of a wall 88 metres in length. Across their knees lies the body of a dead French soldier. The architect was Camille Montagne and the inauguration took place in 1937. The ossuary contains the remains of one thousand French soldiers who gave their lives fighting alongside the Italians near Trieste and not far from Mount Tomba and whose remains could not be found and each of the thousand bricks in the wall carries the name of dead soldier.

== Thann War Memorial ==
The memorial stands in the place de la République and was inaugurated in 1951. Designed by the architect Jean-Daniel Evette, the memorial comprises an obelisk 11 metres high, in Euville stone. Leygue's statue of a female allegory of victory stands before the obelisk.

== Works in the Musée de Vendôme ==
The museum holds several sculptures and paintings by Leygue including "Triptoleme", a 1950 bronze and another bronze "La France" dating to 1955.

== Principal honours ==
- In 1921 he was awarded the first prize in the entry competition for the Ecole Germain Pilon
- In 1923 he was awarded first prize for that year by the Ecole Nationale des Arts Décoratifs de Paris
- In 1931 he was awarded the Grand Prix de Rome
- In 1945 he was made professor at the Ecole Nationale des Beaux Arts de Paris
- In 1955 he was made a Chevalier de la Légion d'Honneur
- In 1965 he became a member of the Institut de France and was elected to the Académie des Beaux Arts
- In 1970 he was made an "Officier des Arts et Lettres"elected presaident of the Académie des Beaux Arts
- In 1980 he became an "Officier de la Légion d'Honneur"
- In 1982 he was reelected as president of the Académie des Beaux Arts.
