= OIC Committee of Permanent Representatives =

The Committee of Permanent Representatives is created by article 13 of the new Charter of the Organisation of the Islamic Conference. It consists of the ambassadors accredited to the OIC at its headquarters in Jeddah, Saudi Arabia. According to article 13 the "prerogatives and modes of operation of the Committee of Permanent Representatives shall be defined by the Council of Foreign Ministers."

Like the Executive Committee, the Committee of Permanent Representatives was created to enhance the OIC's ability to act more effectively and more quickly on matters of international concern to its member states.
