= Palace of Europe =

Seat of the Council of Europe

- Palais de l'Europe
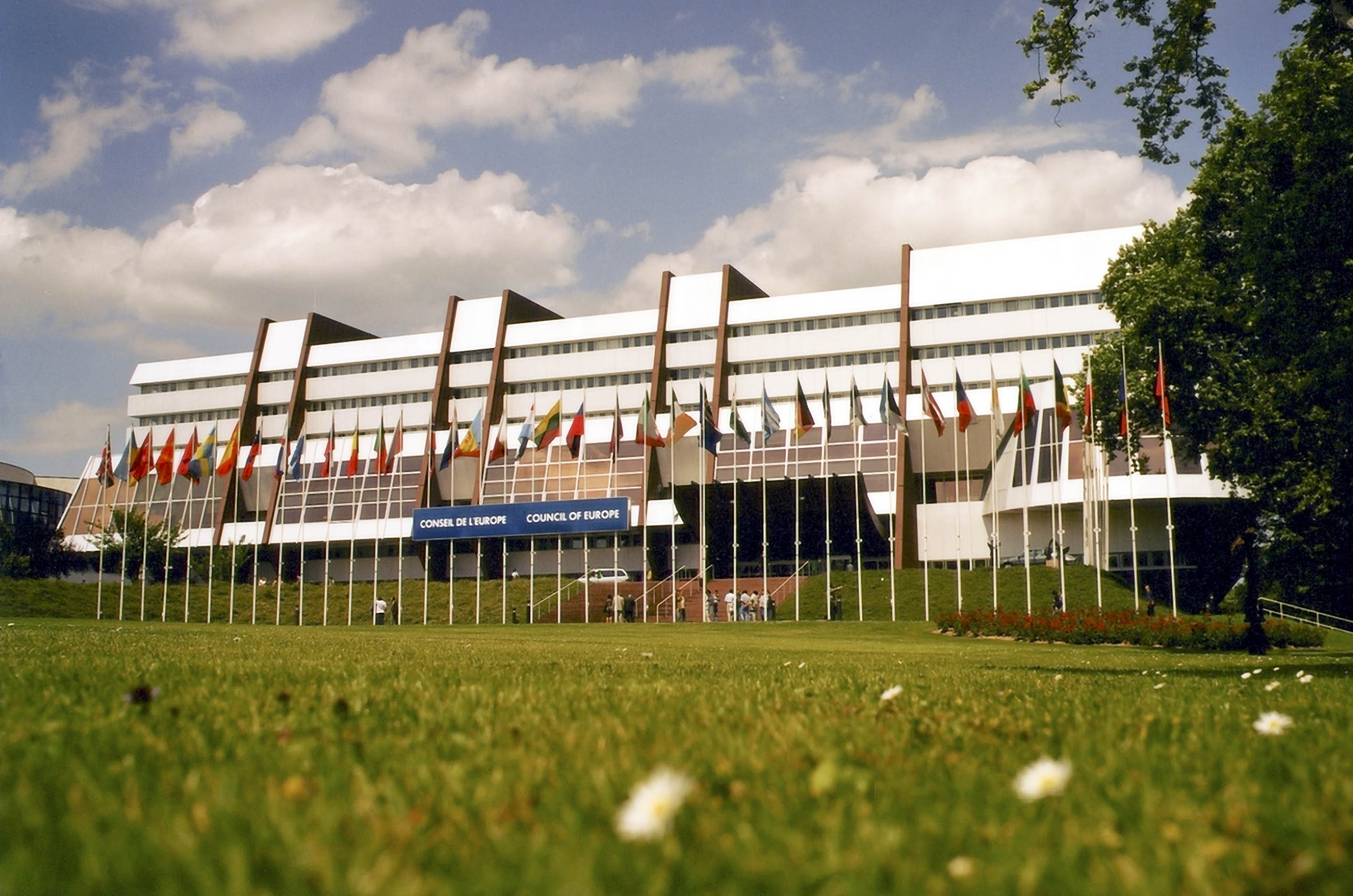
- Facade of the Palace of Europe with flags of member States
- Interactive map of the Palace of Europe area

General information
- Location: Strasbourg, Alsace, France
- Coordinates: 48°35′42″N 7°46′19″E
- Current tenants: Council of Europe
- Construction started: 1972
- Completed: 1977
- Owner: Council of Europe

Technical details
- Floor area: 64,000 m^{2}

Design and construction
- Architect: Henry Bernard

The Palace of Europe (French: Palais de l'Europe) is a building located in Strasbourg, France, that has served as the seat of the Council of Europe since 1977 when it replaced the "House of Europe". Between 1977 and 1999 it was also the Strasbourg seat of the European Parliament.

== Background and history ==
The first assemblies of the Council of Europe used to take place in the stately, 1880s main building of Strasbourg University, the former Kaiser-Wilhelms-Universität. Between 1950 and 1977, they took place in a provisory concrete building of purely functional architecture, the House of Europe (Maison de l'Europe), that stood where there now is the lawn leading up to the Palace of Europe. The architect of this building was Bertrand Monnet.

The first stone of the Palace of Europe was laid on 15 May 1972 by the Swiss politician Pierre Graber. The building, designed by architect Henry Bernard, was inaugurated on 28 January 1977. It was built on the site of a tennis court that had been inaugurated in the 1930s and also used to serve as an ice rink in winter.

== Design ==
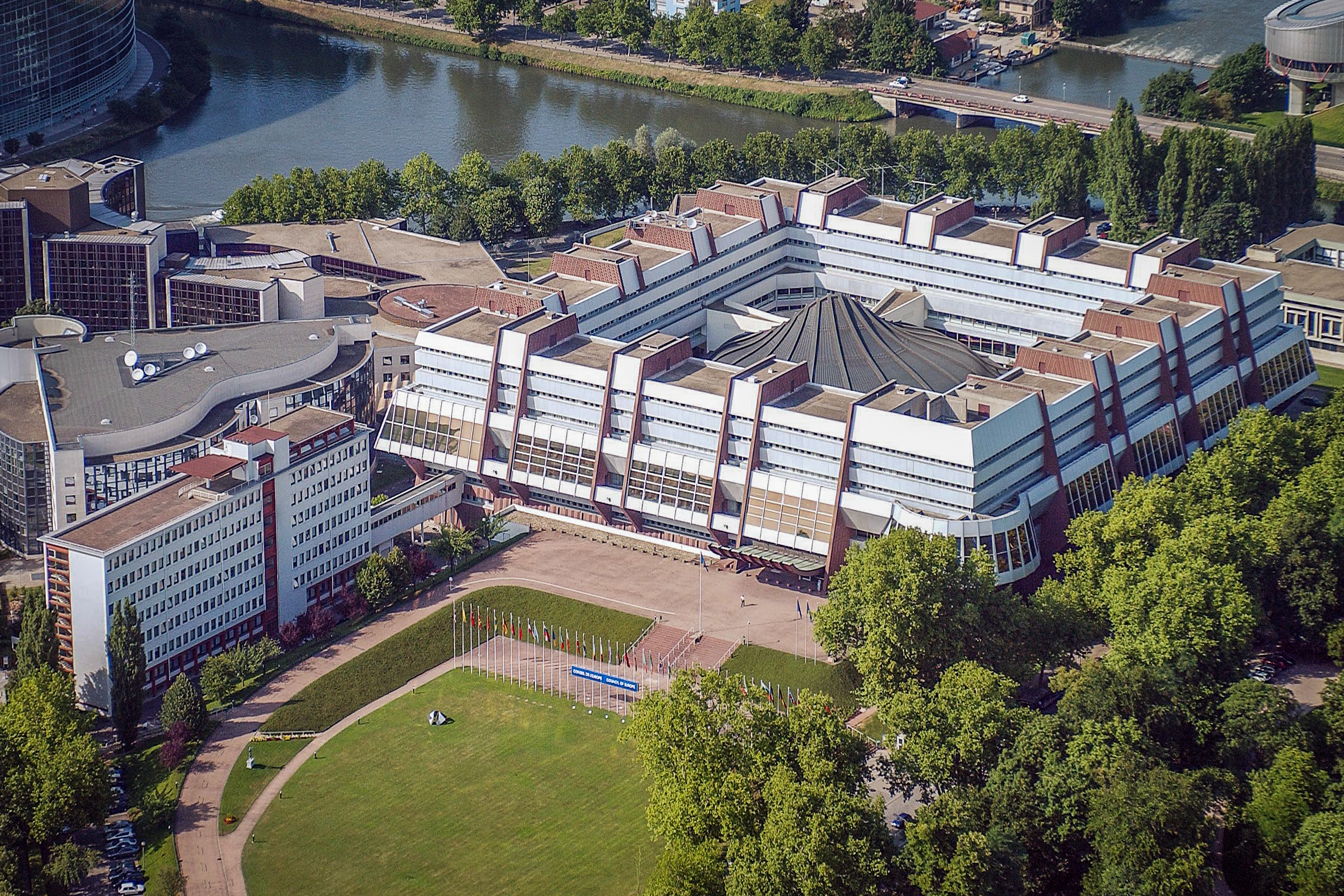
Aerial view of the Palace of Europe

The building's hemicycle

The Palace of Europe is square in shape, 106 metres on each side, with a height of 38 metres (nine stories). Its total working area is 64,000 square metres. It has 17 meeting rooms and a thousand offices for staff of the Council of Europe secretariat. The exterior of the building is red, silver, and brown. The Palace of Europe is located in the "European District" of Strasbourg, about two kilometres northeast of the Grande Île.

From the outside, the Palace of Europe resembles a fortress, since the rows of windows are arranged like arrow slits. The Parliament chamber is covered by a giant dome and resembles an enormous shell.

== Occupants ==
The Committee of Ministers, normally represented by the Ministers Deputies, meets in a circular room projecting from a corner of the eastern wing of the building. The Parliamentary Assembly of the Council of Europe uses the large debating chamber in the centre of the building, called the Hemicycle, famous for its unusual architecture. The Congress of the Council of Europe also holds its plenary sessions in the Hemicycle. The Palace of Europe also accommodates the part of the Council of Europe Secretariat, including the Private Office of the Secretary General of the Council of Europe.

Until 1999, the building also hosted plenary sessions of the European Parliament (an institution of the European Union, which is separate from the Council of Europe). The European Parliament now has its own building, Immeuble Louise Weiss, across the Ill River.

== See also ==
- European Court of Human Rights building
