= Andi Siebenhofer =

Austrian athlete and entrepreneur (born 1977)

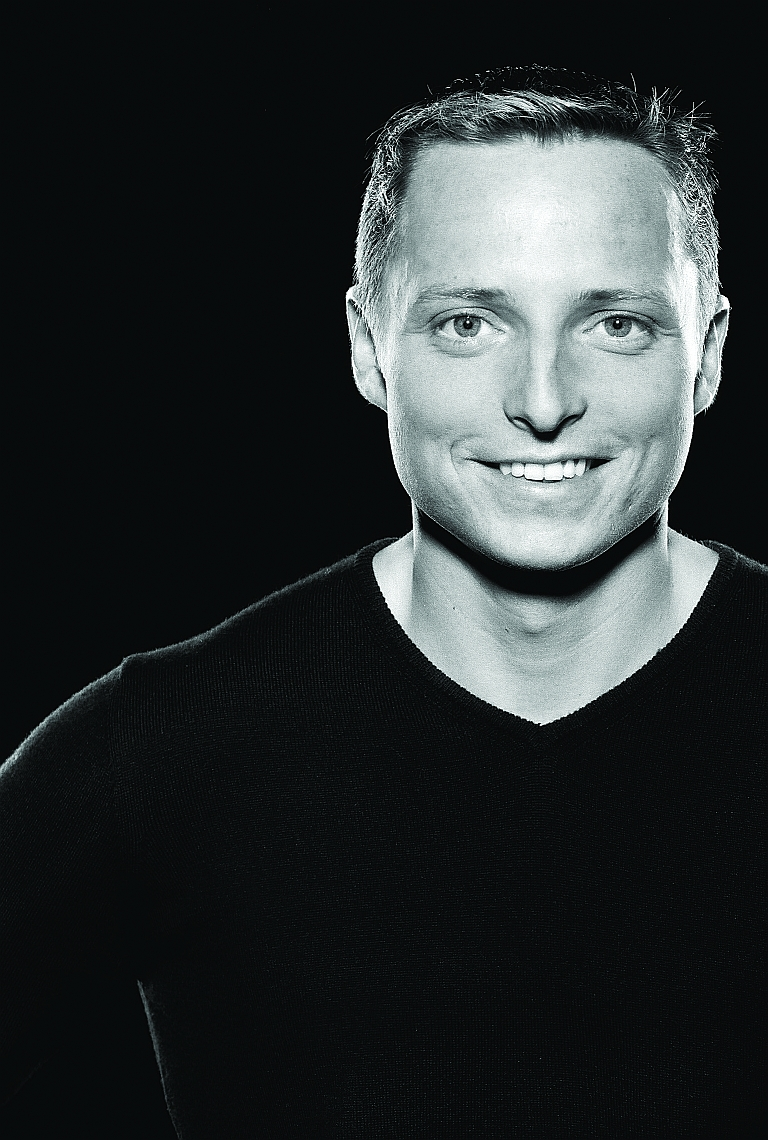
- Siebenhofer in 2010
- Born: January 7, 1977 (age 49); Knittelfeld, Styria, Austria
- Occupations: General Manager and owner of The 7 Group LTD
- Years active: 1995–present
- Website: The 7 Group

Andi (Andreas) Siebenhofer, born on 7 January 1977 in Knittelfeld, Styria, Austria is a former Austrian extreme sports athlete and entrepreneur.

== Life ==
Siebenhofer grew up in a working-class family in Kobenz, near the Styrian city of Knittelfeld. At the age of 16, he became an extreme sports athlete. He also began an apprenticeship and worked 7 years as an engineer/train driver for the ÖBB (Austrian Federal Railway).

== Extreme Sport ==
2000, first world record: From 8 April until 22 May, he initially climbed the Huascarán without any outside help. With its 6,785 meters, it is the highest mountain in Peru. Instead of coming down, he flew with a paraglider to the valley, world record.
2004, 23 December: second world record, longest non-stop flight with a motorized paraglider, 850 km across the Mediterranean. After getting into a storm, he landed just next to the military headquarters of North Egypt in Marsa Matruh and was imprisoned.

== Entrepreneur ==
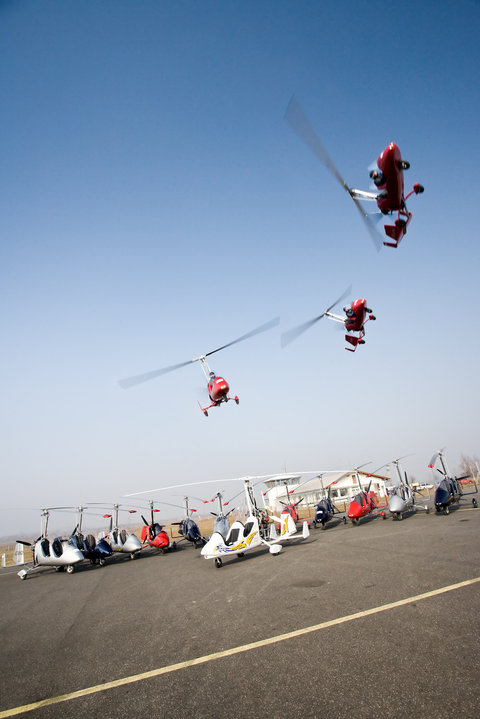
Siebenhofers former gyrocopter-base in Hungary

Early – 2005 – he became aware of so-called gyrocopters in Europe. He established the gyrocopter distribution and training headquarters in Austria, Hungary, Slovakia, Denmark and Spain. The foundation was the Meidl Airport in Fertőszentmiklós, Hungary, where he also established a flight training school.

Other manufacturers committed Siebenhofer as a test pilot.

Today – since 2009 – he is the owner of “The 7 Group LTD”, Erbil, Iraqi Kurdistan. In this year, he will receive the assignment to establish the first training headquarters for Kurdish pilots in Iraq, from Kurdistan Regional Government in Erbil, Iraq, in cooperation with the US Army. Gyrocopters, as well as (as of 2011) helicopters, will be deployed.

2010 and 2011, further gyrocopters will be delivered to the Kurdish interior ministry and pilots will be trained. To prevent terroristic encroachments, the interior ministry will monitor the approach- and take off paths of the airports in Erbil and Sulaymaniyah.

Beginning in 2011, Siebenhofers company delivered helicopters of the type Eurocopter EC 120B for the traffic police in Iraqi Kurdistan. Just as with the gyrocopters, he will train the pilots as well as the ground crew.

14 January 2014 was a historic day in Kurdish history: For the first time ever, a Kurdish-only crew flew a helicopter (EC 120B) over Erbil. The crew were Brigadier Khalid Ali Barzinji and First Lieutenant Sarhang Barwari, both trained by The 7 Group.

During the advancement of the Islamic State towards Kurdistan, Siebenhofer did not leave Kurdistan, although he knows he is a target of IS. He is still involved in training and coordinating the missions of the Kurdish police.

In August 2013 7 Group LTD deployed two Eurocopter EC135 helicopters to Kurdistan for the Kurdistan CTU (counter terrorism unit). 7 Group LTD has re-equipped the helicopters. One (S/N 661) was prior owned by Roman Abramovich and the other one (S/N 681) was originally ordered by the Spanish police, but due to the financial crisis the Spanish government has to step back from the order. So The 7 Group took over the brand new helicopter from Airbus Helicopters, at this time still called Eurocopter.

During the run of the so-called Islamic state towards the capital of Iraqi Kurdistan, Erbil, the 7 Group assisted the Peshmerga. Although the helicopters so far on duty by the Kurdish Police are not equipped for Medevac missions, Siebenhofer personally and his company, The Kurdish Aviation Team, did their utmost and risk their lives when flying to the front line for evacuation of wounded Peshmerga fighters. On these missions, the helicopters were fired at twice and on one occasion a pilot was wounded in his leg. Fortunately and due to the excellent training provided, no total loss was recorded. In addition, an EMS squad was established in Dohuk.

In June 2014 Andi Siebenhofer was awarded a contract by the Counter-Terrorism and Security unit of the Province Sulaymaniyah to establish a new aviation department. Since then, this department was continuously expanded. As of June 2016, 16 pilots and 8 aviation technicians were trained.

During this time four gyroplanes (type Autogyro MTO Sport) where deployed to be used as a basic training equipment. At the same time three Airbus Helicopters AS350B3+ (new designation: H125; S/N 4636, 4743 and 8063) as well as one Cessna Caravan EX (S/N 5043) were delivered to add up to the fleet of the Ministry of Interiors. While the EC135 are stationed in Erbil, the AS350 operate out of Sulaymaniyah.

In July 2016, Andi Siebenhofer met the Federal Minister for Europe, Integration and Foreign Affairs of Austria, Sebastian Kurz, in Erbil.

On July 17, 2016, Andi Siebenhofer and his company 7 Group LTD were awarded by minister Karim Sinjary a new contract for the provision of services, maintenance and training of the complete aviation fleet of the Kurdish Ministry of Interiors. At this time, the fleet comprises 39 aircraft: 2 MD902, 2 EC135, 4 EC120B, 3 AS350B3, 12 MD530, 1 MD500, 1 Cessna Caravan EX, 12 AutoGyro MTO Sport and 2 AutoGyro Calidus.

== Trivia ==
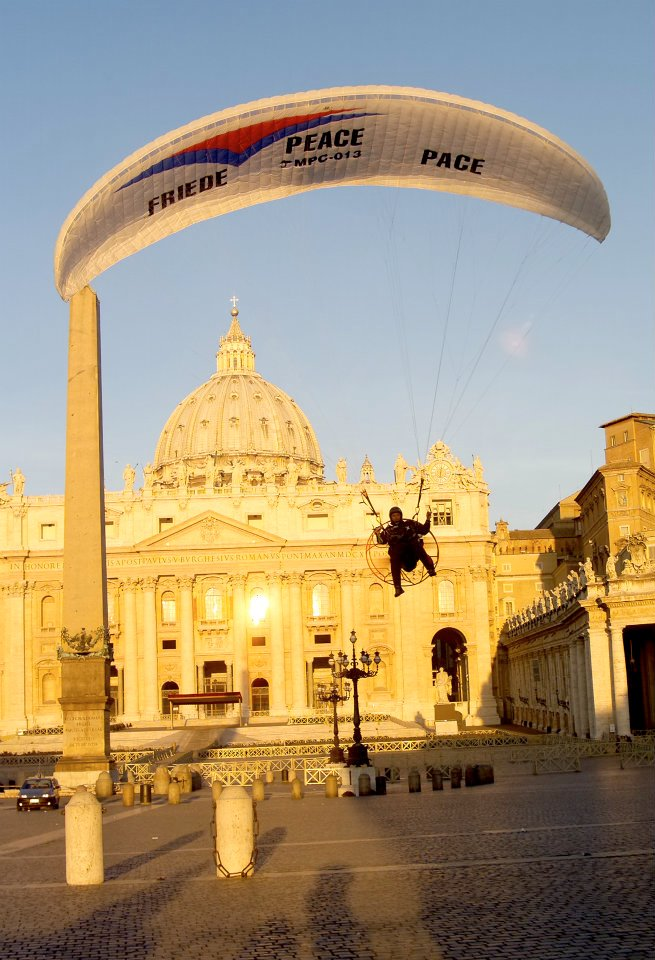
Siebenhofer's landing on St. Peter's Square on 28 March 2003

In 2003 Siebenhofer became internationally known. In the course of a protest action and with 2000 signatures in his baggage, he flew with his paraglider in five days 900 km from Seckau Abbey in Styria to the Vatican City, where he landed on St. Peter's Square on the 28 March. He wanted to hand over signatures to Pope John Paul II. He was arrested due to violation of airspace, but released the following day.
