= Preslav Nakov =

Bulgarian computer scientist

- Born: 26 January 1977 (age 49); Veliko Turnovo, Bulgaria
- Education: University of California, Berkeley (PhD in Computer Science); Sofia University (MSc in Computer Science)
- Known for: Natural language processing Detecting fake news online Sentiment analysis
- Scientific career
- Fields: Computer Science
- Workplaces: Mohamed bin Zayed University of Artificial Intelligence; Qatar Computing Research Institute; National University of Singapore; Sofia University "St. Kliment Ohridski"; Bulgarian Academy of Sciences; University of California, Berkeley; University College London
- Thesis: Using the Web as an Implicit Training Set: Application to Noun Compound Syntax and Semantics (2007)
- Doctoral advisor: Marti Hearst
- Website: Personal website

Preslav Nakov (born on 26 January 1977 in Veliko Turnovo, Bulgaria) is a computer scientist who works on natural language processing. He is particularly known for his research on fake news detection, automatic detection of offensive language, and biomedical text mining. Nakov obtained a PhD in computer science under the supervision of Marti Hearst from the University of California, Berkeley. He was the first person to receive the prestigious John Atanasov Presidential Award for achievements in the development of the information society by the President of Bulgaria.

== Education ==
Preslav Nakov grew up in Veliko Turnovo, Bulgaria, where he attended primary and secondary school, obtaining a Diploma in Mathematics from the Secondary School of Mathematics and Natural Sciences 'Vassil Drumev' in 1996. He then obtained a MSc degree in Informatics (Computer Science) with specialisations in Artificial Intelligence and Information and Communication Technologies from Sofia University in 2001. During his MSc studies, he worked as a teaching assistant at Sofia University and the Bulgarian Academy of Sciences, as well as a guest lecturer at University College London during a visit in Spring 1999. Subsequently, he enrolled into the PhD program at the Department of Electrical Engineering and Computer Science, University of California, Berkeley, partly supported by a Fulbright Scholarship. Under the supervision of Marti Hearst, he wrote a thesis on the topic of text mining from the Web, and graduated with a PhD in Computer Science from UC Berkeley in 2007.

== Career ==
Upon graduating from the University of California, Berkeley, Nakov started work as a Research Fellow at the National University of Singapore. From 2012 to 2022, he was a Principal Research Scientist at the Qatar Computing Research Institute (QCRI). Since 2022, he has been a Full Professor of Natural Language Processing at Mohamed bin Zayed University of Artificial Intelligence and serves as Department Chair. He maintains a position as an honorary lecturer at Sofia University.

== Research ==
Preslav Nakov works in the area of natural language processing and text mining. He has published over 300 peer-reviewed research papers. Preslav Nakov's early research was on lexical semantics and text mining. He published influential papers on biomedical text mining, most prominently on methods to identify citation sentences in biomedical papers. He is, though, best known for his research on fake news detection, including his work on predicting the factuality and bias of news sources, as well as his research on the automatic detection of offensive language. Nakov also previously led the organisation of a popular evaluation campaign on sentiment analysis systems as part of SemEval between the years of 2015 and 2017. He currently coordinates the Tanbih News Aggregator project, a large project with partners at the Qatar Computing Research Institute and the MIT Computer Science and Artificial Intelligence Laboratory, which aims to uncover stance, bias and propaganda in news.

== Selected honors and distinctions ==
- 2003 John Atanasov Presidential Award for achievements in the development of the information society
- 2011 RANLP 2011 Young Researcher Award
- 2020 Conference on Information and Knowledge Management, best paper award
