= Henry Bernard (architect) =

French architect and urban planner

- Born: 21 February 1912; Albertville, France
- Died: 10 December 1994 (aged 82)
- Occupation: Architect
- Awards: Prix de Rome, 1938
- Buildings: Palace of Europe; Maison de la Radio
- Projects: Campus 1 of the University of Caen Lower Normandy

Henry Bernard (21 February 1912, Albertville, France – 10 December 1994) was a French architect and urban planner.

== Family ==
Son of Henri Bernard, born 25 September 1880 in Albertville, and Louise Jeanne Marie "Lily" Vallat, born 22 August 1882 in Saint-Étienne, his parents married on 22 May 1911 in Sury-le-Comtal. Bernard had two brothers, Pierre, born in 1913, and Jean, born in 1933 from another marriage.

== Biography ==
Bernard received his diploma in architecture in 1938. That same year he won first prize in the Prix de Rome. Afterwards he worked as an architect in charge of civil buildings and national monuments, a position concerned with the renovation of historic buildings. He also served as urban planner for the city of Grenoble, director of the Atelier parisien d'urbanisme, and studio director of the École nationale supérieure des Beaux-Arts. He was elected to the Académie des Beaux-Arts in 1968, replacing Jean Dupas. He became president of that institution in 1988, serving until his death in 1994.

== Works ==
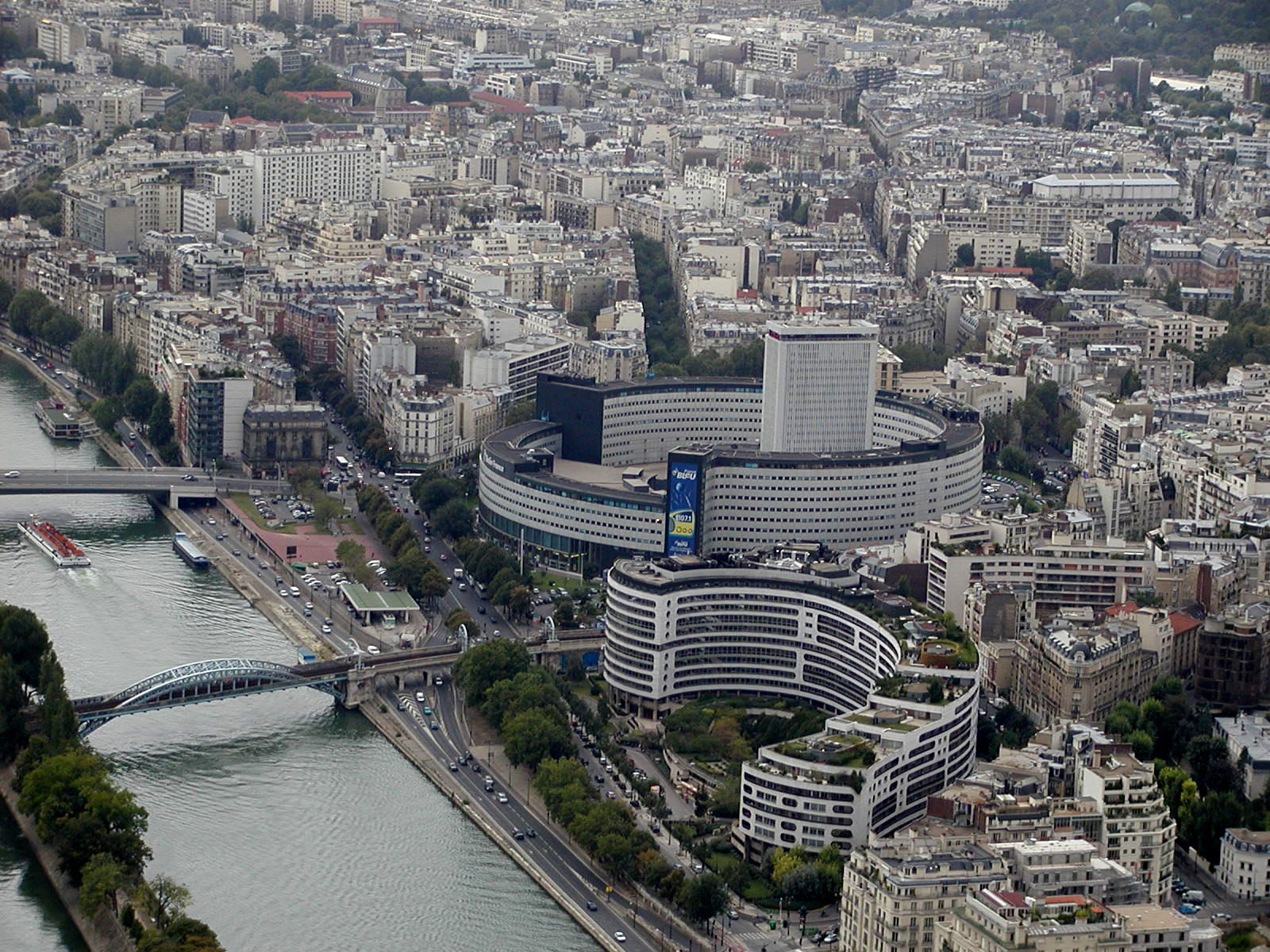
The Maison de la Radio

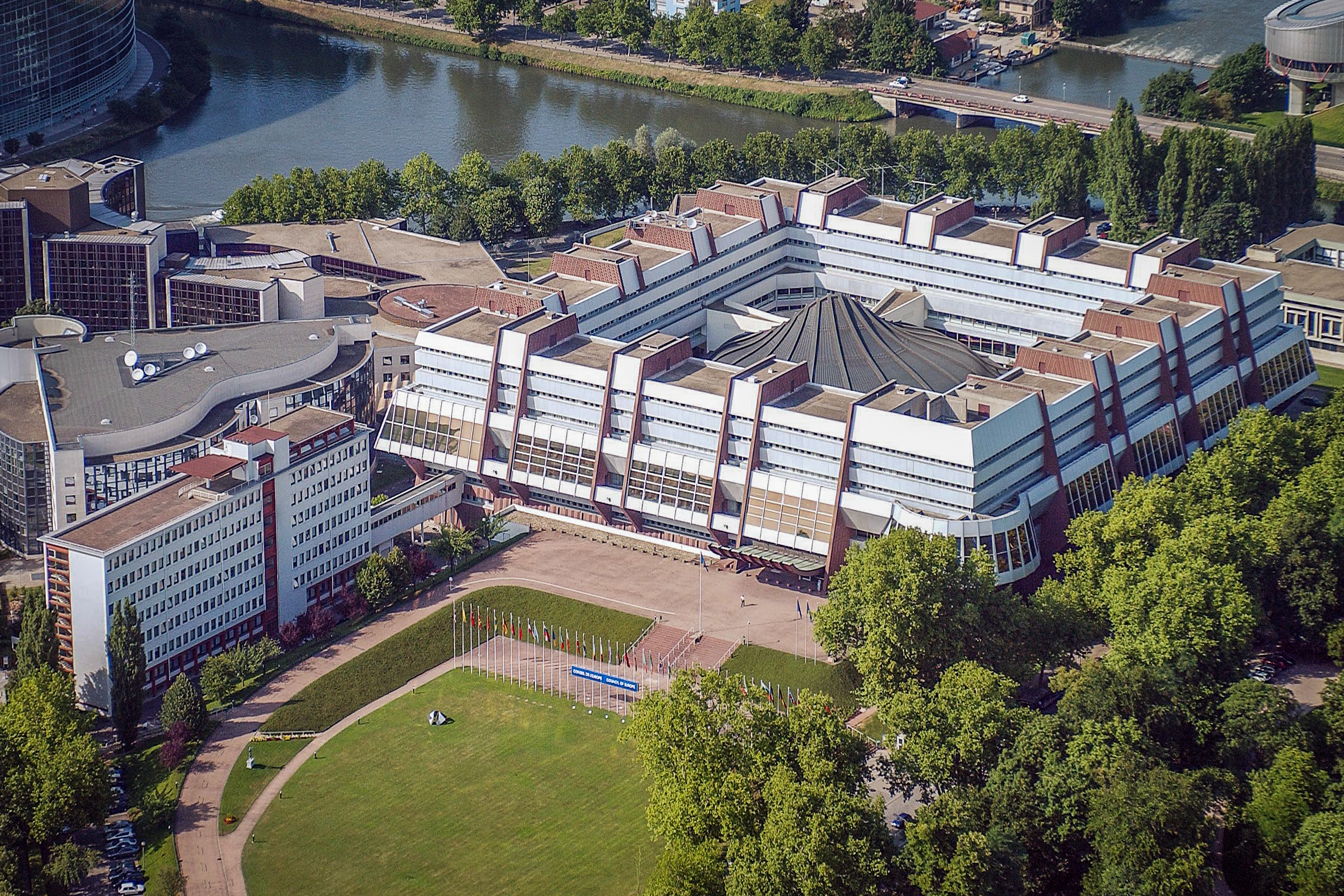
Palace of Europe

After World War II, he participated in the rebuilding of Caen, under the direction of Marc Brillaud de Laujardière.

- Campus 1 of the University of Caen Lower Normandy (1948–1957), protected building in 2012
- Church of Saint Julian (1954–1963), protected building in 2007

Other works:

- Palace of Europe, the Council of Europe's headquarters in Strasbourg (1974–1977)
- Maison de la Radio, Paris (1952–1963)
- Val-d'Oise prefecture building in Cergy (1969)
- The teaching hospitals of Caen, Tours, and Grenoble

== Sources ==
- fr:Henry Bernard

== See also ==
- Louis Leygue Sculptor-Maison de la Radio
