= Emilio Milián =

Cuban-American journalist

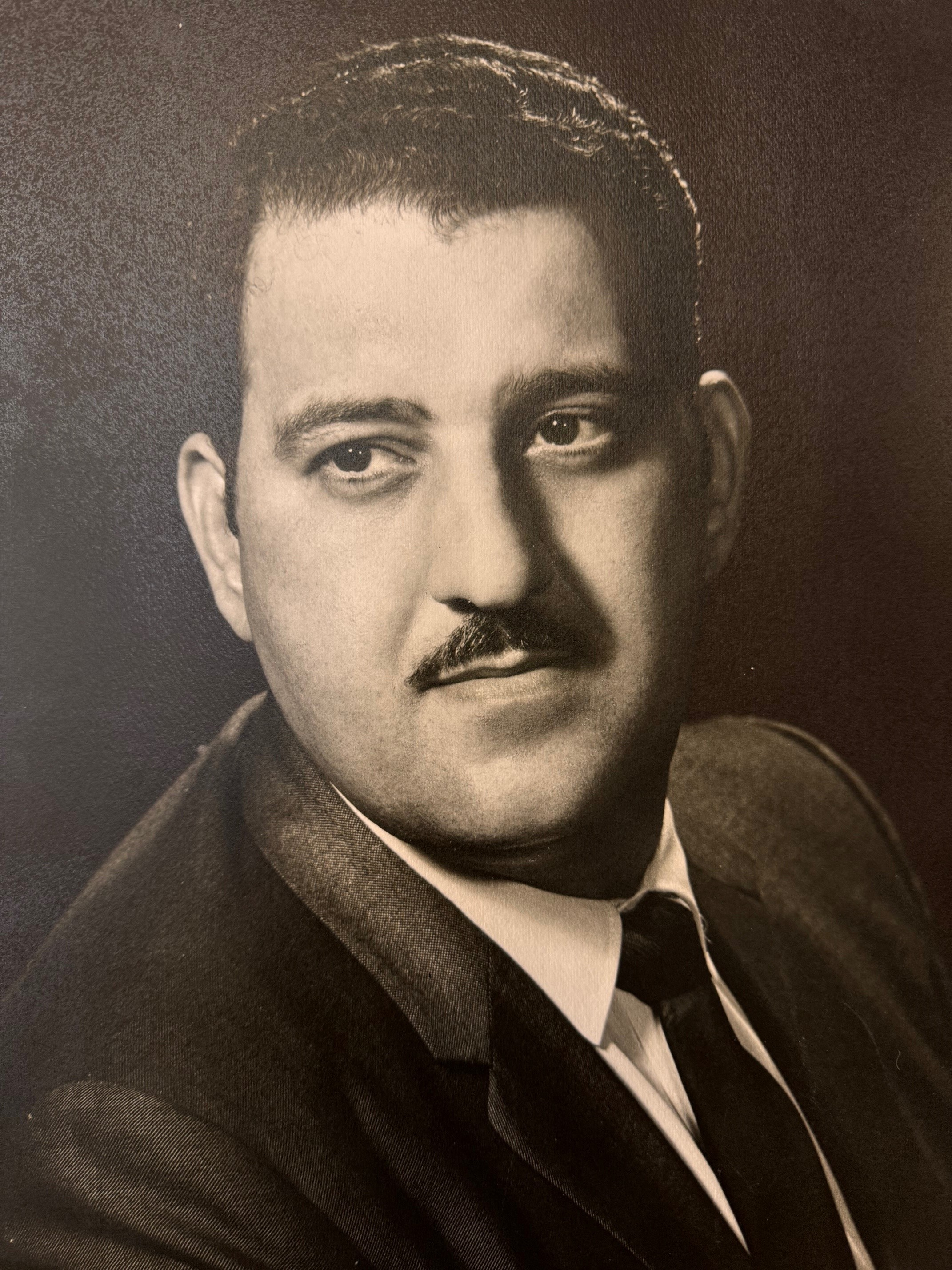
- Born: September 8, 1931; Las Villas Province, Cuba
- Died: March 15, 2001 (aged 69); Miami, Florida, U.S.
- Occupation: Newscaster

Emilio Milián (September 8, 1931 – March 15, 2001) was a Cuban-American radio commentator and newscaster. Known for his criticism both of communism and of terrorist activity among the Cuban exiles in Florida, he was the victim of a car-bombing attack in 1976 which left him disabled.

== Biography ==
Emilio Milián was born in the Las Villas Province of Cuba in September 1931. He emigrated to Mexico in 1965 with his wife and three children. After some months, the family moved to Miami, in the US state of Florida. There, Milián began working for a radio station named WMIE as a sports commentator, and also bought a print shop. This station was eventually renamed WQBA, and Milián rose to become its news director in 1971. He presented a Spanish program on WQBA in the 1970s, which was popular among the Cuban exile population in southern Florida. The Miami Herald stated in 1976 that Milián's radio station had the largest audience of any in the Miami metropolitan area.

Milián was best known for criticizing communism on his radio program "Habla el Pueblo" (The People Speak). However, he also criticized the Cuban exiles who carried out terrorist attacks against the Cuban government, and who believed themselves to be Cuban patriots. The positions he took brought him praise, but also led to him being branded a traitor, and to him receiving death threats. In April 1976, a bomb went off in Milián's car when he started it to return home from work. Milián lost both his legs in the attack, which is generally attributed to his outspoken criticism of violence committed by Cuban exiles. Milián also suffered injuries to his ear drums and eyes.

Two Cuban exiles, Gaspar Jiménez and Gustavo Castillo, were indicted by a grand jury for the bombing in April 1981, nearly five years after it took place. Investigators in the case had identified Jiménez as a chief suspect. A witness said he saw Jiménez working on Milian's car shortly before the bombing. The indictments were kept secret, as the two men were serving prison sentences in Mexico on charges of having kidnapped a Cuban consul, and prosecutors were afraid they would attempt to avoid arrest if the indictments were known. However, soon after Jiménez was released from prison in 1983, the indictments were dropped, with the prosecuting attorney stating that there was insufficient evidence. No one was prosecuted for the bombing.

Milian left his job at WQBA after the attack, but returned to working in radio in 1989. He later worked at 670-AM, another radio station, and held this position until late 2000. He died in March 2001, at the age of 69. During the later part of his life, he suffered from heart disease and diabetes.
