= Hermann Lichtenegger =

Austrian politician

Hermann Lichtenegger (September 14, 1900, Knittelfeld, Styria, – March 11, 1984, Vienna) was an Austrian socialist trade unionist, KPÖ politician, and an Under-Secretary of State for Industry, Commerce, Trade, and Traffic in the post-war provisional Renner government. For his early work as a unionist and wartime KPÖ activities he was considered a Widerstandskämpfer, resistance fighter.

== Life ==
Lichtenegger was a trained locksmith and in 1921 he was hired by the Austrian Federal Railways. From 1918 to 1934 he was a member of the SDAPÖ, and after the February Uprising in 1934 he joined the KPÖ, consequently in 1934 he was jailed because of his work for the Imperial Trade Union Commission (Reichsgewerkschaftskommission). In early 1938, he again spent time in prison for his activities with the KPÖ.

At the end of August 1937, he participated in the last Communist Party Conference before the German invasion (Anschluss) near Prague. After Anschluss the Austrian Federal Railway (BBÖ) was taken over by the Deutsche Reichsbahn. Litchenegger's employment was then discontinued by the railway in 1938. In 1942 he was arrested by the Gestapo and suspended from opportunities of further services. During the Vienna Offensive in 1945 Lichtenegger lead a communist resistance group out of the boiler house at Vienna's East Train Station.

== Post-War ==
At the third cabinet council meeting of the party leaders on May 4, 1945 in the KPÖ house in Schottenfeldgasse, where Lichtenegger had previously organized a meeting of the railway workers, he was nominated for the provisional government; from May 4 to December 20, 1945, Lichtenegger served as the Under-Secretary of State for Industry, Commerce, Trade, and Traffic in the provisional Renner Government. Lichtenegger later became the Vice President of the General Directorate of the Austrian State Railways, and from April 22, 1946 he was a member of the Central Committee of the KPÖ. He played a leading role in the reconstruction of the railway system in Austria.
