= February 1977 =

Month of 1977

| << | February 1977 | | | | | >> |
| Su | Mo | Tu | We | Th | Fr | Sa |
| | | 1 | 2 | 3 | 4 | 5 |
| 6 | 7 | 8 | 9 | 10 | 11 | 12 |
| 13 | 14 | 15 | 16 | 17 | 18 | 19 |
| 20 | 21 | 22 | 23 | 24 | 25 | 26 |
| 27 | 28 |

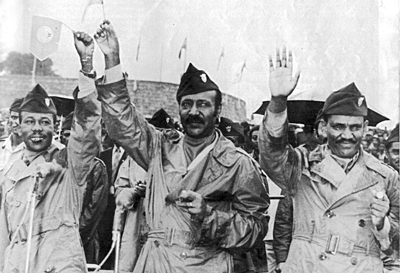
February 3, 1977: Ethiopian Deputy Chairman Mengistu Haile Mariam (left) overthrows his boss, Head of State Tafari Benti (center) and has him executed along with others as a "counter-revolutionary", then begins the "Red Terror" campaign to exterminate his opponents. Benti's chief ally, Atnafu Abate (right), will be executed in November.

The following events occurred in February 1977:

== February 1, 1977 (Tuesday) ==
- Françoise Claustre, a French archaeologist who had been a hostage of rebels in Chad for almost three years, returned to France days after being set free. She had been captured near Bardai on April 20, 1974. Returning as well was her husband, Pierre Claustre, who had been captured by the rebels in August, 1975, while he had been trying to negotiate the release of Françoise. Upon their arrival, Françoise and Pierre were admitted to a hospital in Toulouse for an evaluation of their health.
- The Indian Coast Guard, part of the nation's Ministry of Defence, was established as a maritime law enforcement and search and rescue agency with jurisdiction over India's territorial waters.
- Died: David E. Finley Jr., 86, American cultural leader who led the Roberts Commission during World War II to rescue war-threatened art works, as well as founding the National Portrait Gallery and the National Trust for Historic Preservation.

== February 2, 1977 (Wednesday) ==
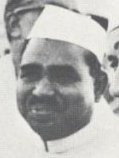
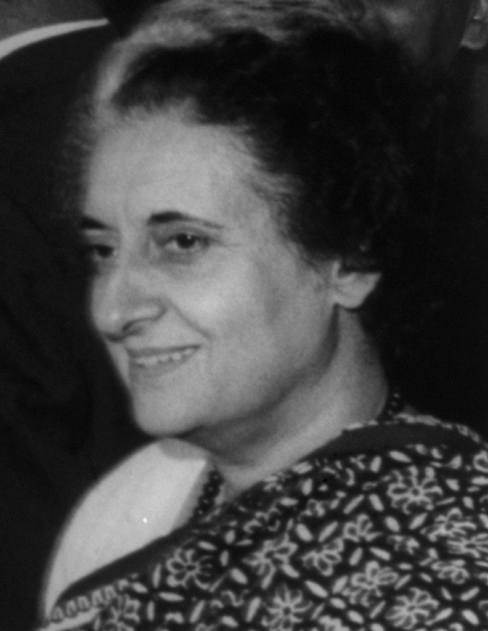
Jagjivan Ram and Indira Gandhi
- The Congress Party of India, led by Prime Minister Indira Gandhi, was split as Agriculture Minister Jagjivan Ram and four other members of her cabinet resigned to form the Congress for Democracy Party, which would later merge with the Janata Party.
- The Soviet Union's Salyut 4 space station was de-orbited after slightly more than two years of service, during which two different crews of cosmonauts and docked and stayed on board. The station burned up in Earth's atmosphere the next day.
- Born: Shakira (stage name for Shakira Isabel Mebarak), Colombian vocalist and songwriter, bestselling Latin music singer and three-time Grammy Award winner; in Barranquilla

== February 3, 1977 (Thursday) ==
- Lieutenant General Tafari Benti, Ethiopia's nominal head of state as Chairman of the Central Committee of the Derg, the ruling 40-member military council, was executed along with six other Derg members after a gun battle between rival factions during a meeting in Addis Ababa. The Derg's First Vice Chairman, Mengistu Haile Mariam, announced afterward that Benti and the other six (who included Secretary-General Almayahu Haile ad Information Minister Asrat Desta) had been exposed as supporters of the "counter-revolutionary" Ethiopian People's Revolutionary Party. Mengistu then became the new Chairman of the Derg and launched Ethiopia's "Red Terror" (Qey Shibir) campaign that would kill as many as 100,000 of the Derg's political opponents. Benti's deputy chairman, Atnafu Abate, had not been present at the meeting and would remain part of the Derg until his own arrest and execution on November 12.
- A blizzard in northern Japan killed 18 people whose houses collapsed under the weight of the snow on their roofs, while 13 others froze to death. The storm, blowing southward from Siberia, demolished 90 houses.
- Born: Daddy Yankee (stage name for Ramón Luis Ayala), Puerto Rican American rapper known as the "King of Reggaeton"; in San Juan
- Died: Pauline Starke, 76, American silent film actress

== February 4, 1977 (Friday) ==
- In the U.S., the derailment of an elevated train in Chicago killed 11 commuters and injured 183 others. At about 5:30 p.m., the 8-car train rear-ended a 6-car train ahead of it in an accident attributed to human error. Two crowded cars plunged 20 feet (6.1 m) from the "EL" tracks into the intersection of Wabash Avenue and Lake Street.
- Born: Gavin DeGraw, American singer-songwriter, in South Fallsburg, New York
- Died: Brett Halliday, 72, American author of the Michael Shayne mystery novels, written under the pen name as Davis Dresser

== February 5, 1977 (Saturday) ==
- In the east African nation of Tanzania (a union of Tanganyika on the mainland and the islands of Zanzibar), the Chama Cha Mapinduzi (CCM) political party was created with the merger of the Tanganyika African National Union (TANU) of President Julius Nyerere and Zanzibar's Afro-Shirazi Party in an elaborate ceremony in Zanzibar City. Chama Cha Mapinduzi was a Swahili language translation of the words for a political party ("chama") and for "revolution" ("mapinduzi").
- Born: Ben Ainslie, British sport sailing competitor, Olympic gold medalist 2000, 2004, 2008 and 2012, and 11-time world champion; in Macclesfield, Cheshire
- Died:
  - Oskar Klein, 82, Swedish theoretical physicist
  - William J. Crum, 58, U.S. businessman who was a major part of black market operations during the Vietnam War through his Tradewell Company that had exclusive contracts to supply the Post Exchange (PX) on individual bases overseas through a program of kickbacks and bribery, died in a fire at his apartment in Hong Kong.

== February 6, 1977 (Sunday) ==
- The Silver Jubilee of Elizabeth II, a year-long celebration of the 25th anniversary of the accession (on February 6, 1952) of Queen Elizabeth II to the British throne, opened with church services across Britain to recognize the 25th anniversary of the death of King George VI. Four days later, the Queen began her visit to Southern Pacific nations within the British Commonwealth which recognized her as their reigning monarch, starting with Fiji (February 16 and 17), New Zealand (February 22 to March 7), Australia (March 7 to March 23), and Papua New Guinea (March 23 and 25).
- In Canada, René Lévesque, the pro-independence Premier of Quebec, accidentally killed Edgar Trottier while driving his car. Trottier was a homeless man who had been "lying in the middle of McDougall road, near Cedar Ave." at 4:15 in the morning, while Premier Lévesque was driving his secretary in her car after a late night visit to the home of newspaper editor Yves Michaud. Lévesque slammed on the brakes but struck Trottier and the car dragged the victim 140 feet (43 m) as it slid on a downhill slope. Lévesque, the province's head of government, was fined $25 for not wearing his glasses as required by his license.
- In Rhodesia (now Zimbabwe) a group of guerrillas killed seven white missionaries in an attack the St. Paul's High School in Chisipite, a suburb of the Rhodesian capital of Salisbury (now Harare).
- Born: Ali Seezan, Maldivian film producer; in Malé
- Died: Gustave Gilbert, 65, American psychologist and author known for his book The Psychology of Dictatorship, a psychohistorical study of Adolf Hitler

== February 7, 1977 (Monday) ==
- Hua Guofeng, successor to Mao Zedong as the Chairman of the Chinese Communist Party (CCP) and de facto leader of the People's Republic of China, announced a conservative policy, the "Two Whatevers", in an editorial published simultaneously in the Party newspaper People's Daily, the journal Red Flag and the People's Liberation Army Daily. In the editorial, titled "Study the Documents Well and Grasp the Key Link", Chairman Hua referred to his predecessor, declaring "We will resolutely uphold whatever policy decisions Chairman Mao made, and unswervingly follow whatever instructions Chairman Mao gave." The decision to maintain Mao's policies would lead to a backlash from Deng Xiaoping and other members of the CCP Politburo and Central Committee in 1978, the removal of Hua as party chairman, and a new policy to modernize China's economy to compete with the rest of the world.
- The Soviet Union launched Soyuz 24 with Viktor Gorbatko and Yury Glazkov to dock with the Salyut 5 space station.
- Born:
  - Mariusz Pudzianowski, Polish strength athlete and mixed martial artist; winner of the World's Strongest Man title in 2002, 2003, 2005, 2007, and 2008; in Biala Rawska
  - Tsuneyasu Miyamoto, Japanese footballer with 71 caps for the Japan national football team; in Tondabayashi, Osaka Prefecture

== February 8, 1977 (Tuesday) ==
- Convicted West German terrorist Brigitte Mohnhaupt of the Red Army Faction was paroled from Stammheim Prison after serving time for a 1972 conviction. Mohnhaupt returned to her activities with the Faction and would help carry out the April 7 assassination of West Germany's Chief Prosecutor, Siegfried Buback less than two months later, on April 7.
- Speaking on behalf of the Government of the United Kingdom, Samuel Silkin, the Attorney General for England and Wales and for Northern Ireland, informed the European Court of Human Rights in the case of Ireland v. the United Kingdom that the Government would not reintroduce the five techniques of torture, banned in 1972, as an aid to interrogation of prisoners. Edward Heath, Prime Minister at the time, had announced on March 2, 1972 that the five techniques (prolonged wall-standing, hooding, loud noise, sleep deprivation and food deprivation) would not be used again.
- Voting was held in the United States and in Canada among 1.4 million steelworkers for the president of the United Steelworkers of America labor union. Lloyd McBride defeated Ed Sadlowski by a margin of about 322,000 to 238,000 votes, and, after an unsuccessful challenge by Sadlowski, would succeed retiring USWA President I. W. Abel on June 1.
- In the U.S. state of Ohio, Larry Flynt, publisher of the pornographic magazine Hustler was convicted by the Court of Common Pleas for Hamilton County, Ohio (in Cincinnati) of pandering obscenity and of engaging in "organized crime" as defined by a new Ohio law. Flynt was sentenced by Judge William J. Morrisey to at least 7 years in prison and no more than 25, and made plans to appeal the constitutionality of the law. After six days in jail, he was released on $55,000 bond.
- Born: Jim Carrington, English author of children's literature known for the Otis the Robot series and the Sang Kancil series; in Norwich, Norfolk

== February 9, 1977 (Wednesday) ==
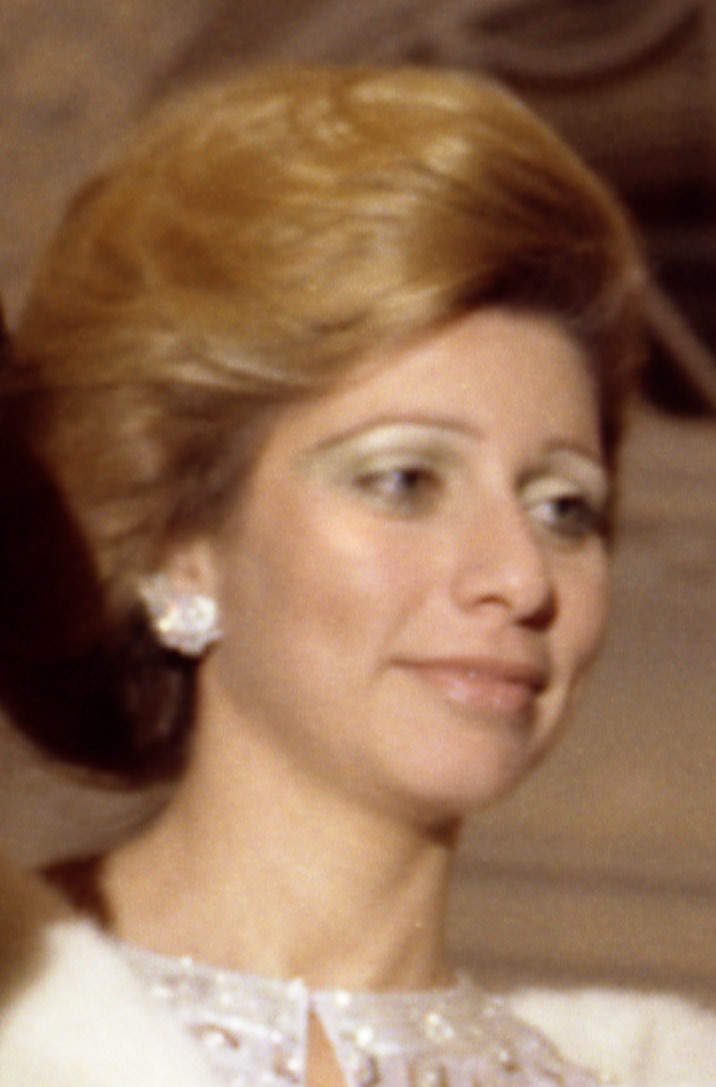
Queen Alia

- Queen Alia of Jordan, the 28-year-old wife of King Hussein and queen consort since their marriage in 1972, was killed in a helicopter crash, along with Health Minister Mohammed al‐Beshir, the pilot and a Jordanian Air Force medic. Queen Alia and al-Beshir were returning to Amman after an inspection trip to Tafilah when their helicopter went down in a violent rainstorm. King Hussein went on nationwide radio to personally announce his wife's death.
- Spain and the Soviet Union re-established diplomatic relations almost 40 years after terminating them following the 1937 victory of the late Francisco Franco over the Spain's left-wing Republican government. Prior to the break in relations, Spain's government had shipped 510 tons of gold to Russia for safekeeping.
- Died: Sergey Ilyushin, 82, Soviet Russian aircraft designer who founded the government-owned Ilyushin Design Bureau in 1933. He designed the Ilyushin Il-2 single engine ground-attack warplane, the single most-often produced military aircraft design in aviation history (with 42,330 produced), and later worked on the team creating what was once the largest capacity jet airliner, the 200-seat Ilyushin Il-62.

== February 10, 1977 (Thursday) ==
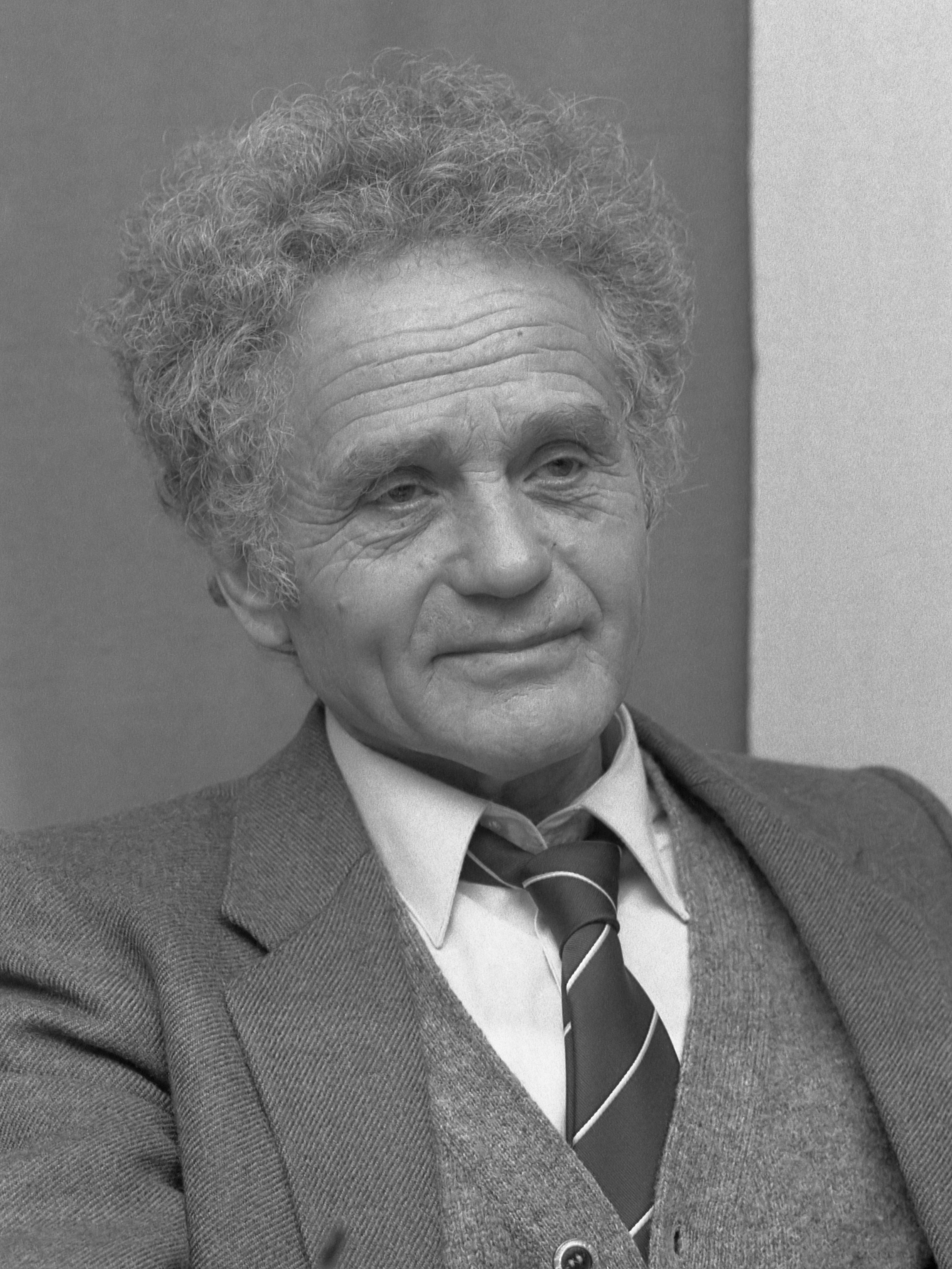
Orlov

- Soviet physicist and human rights activist Yuri Orlov, who had organized the Moscow Helsinki Group to document Soviet violations of the human rights provisions of the 1975 Helsinki Accords was arrested on charges of failing to disband an anti-government group. Orlov would be sentenced on May 15, 1978, to seven years imprisonment in a labor camp and five years of internal exile in Siberia, before being released in 1986.
- In Sri Lanka, a group of four Tamil members of parliament— K. P. Ratnam, Appapillai Amirthalingam, V. N. Navaratnam and Kathiripillai Thurairatnam— were acquitted of charges of sedition after having been arrested on May 21, 1976.
- The White House announced that U.S. President Jimmy Carter would answer questions from random callers on March 5, 1977, in a live CBS Radio Network broadcast of a show titled "Ask President Carter".
- American insurance company executive Arthur L. Williams Jr. founded Primerica Financial Services as the A. L. Williams Corporation.
- Born: Shahin Novrasli, Azerbaijani jazz pianist and classical music composer; in Baku, Azerbaijani SSR, Soviet Union
- Died: Frank "The Bomp" Bompensiero, 70, American organized crime figure who served as the caporegime for the Los Angeles Mafia and as a hitman, was shot to death on orders of mob boss Dominic Brooklier while walking home in San Diego. Brooklier had ordered the killing after discovering that Bompensiero had become an FBI informant. Another mob associate, Thomas Ricciardi, would be charged with the murder but would die of heart disease before the trial could begin.

== February 11, 1977 (Friday) ==
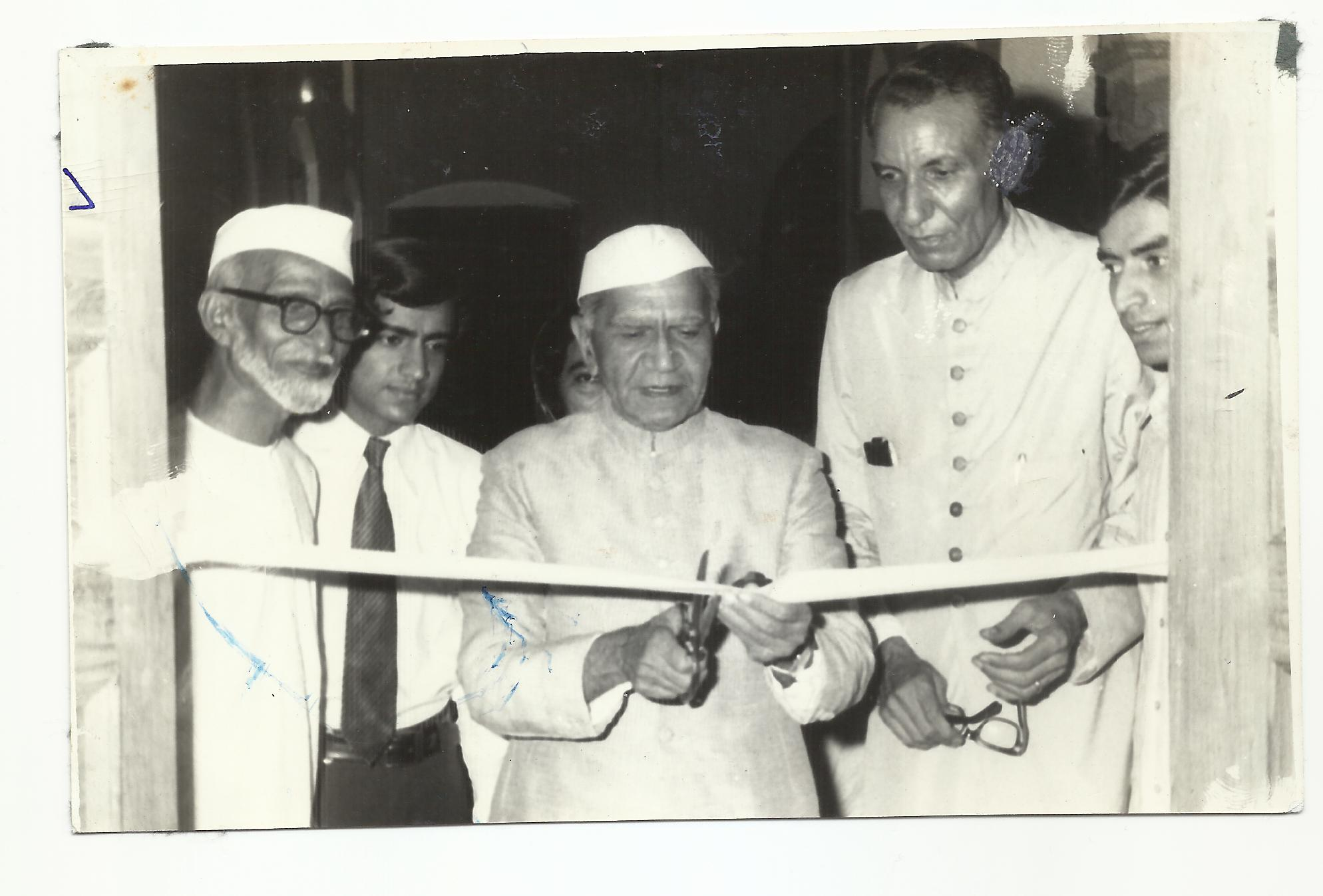
President Fakharuddin Ali Ahmed

- Fakhruddin Ali Ahmed, the 5th President of India and head of state of the nation since 1974, died of a heart attack the day after returning early from a state visit to Malaysia because of illness. President Ahmed was found unresponsive after having suffered a fatal heart attack while taking a bath at the Rashtrapati Bhavan, the presidential palace in Delhi. Vice President B. D. Jatti was sworn into office hours later as the Acting President of India until an election could be held in July. The U.S. delegation to the funeral was led by the Lillian Carter, the 78-year-old mother of President Jimmy Carter; Mrs. Carter had served as a Peace Corps volunteer in India 10 years earlier.
- Born: Mike Shinoda, American singer and co-founder of the band Linkin Park; in Panorama City neighborhood of Los Angeles

== February 12, 1977 (Saturday) ==
- In the West African nation of Guinea, three former cabinet ministers of President Sékou Touré were placed on a "black diet" ("diete noire") at the prison camp in Camp Boiro, a means of gradually starving them to death. Justice Minister Diallo Telli (who had been the first president of the Organization of African Unity), Trade Minister Alpha Oumar Barry, and Planning Minister Alioune Dramé had all been arrested on July 12, 1976, along with military officers Lamine Kouyaté and Alassane Diallo, on charges of planning a coup. All five were dead in less than three weeks, with Dramé dying on March 1.
- Greek Cypriot leader Archbishop Makarios III and Turkish Cypriot leader Rauf Denktash met for four hours at the invitation of U.N. Secretary General Kurt Waldheim, and agreed to resume peace negotiations in war-torn Cyprus. The meeting took place in the Cypriot capital of Nicosia and lasted four hours.
- The Gallup Poll determined that drinking of liquor in the United States was at the highest level it had been since the late 1930s, with 71% of adults drinking alcoholic beverages, and the percentage of people reporting family trouble from liquor abuse increasing to 18%, compared to 12% in 1974.
- Born: Galina Dodon, First Lady of the Republic of Moldova from 2016 to 2020; in Molovata, Moldavian SSR, Soviet Union
- Died:
  - Wang Dulu (pen name for Wang Baoxiang), 68, Chinese mystery, science fiction and romance novelist. His 1942 Crouching Tiger, Hidden Dragon, which would later become the basis for a successful 2000 film of the same name
  - Mary Callery, 73, American abstract expressionist sculptor

== February 13, 1977 (Sunday) ==
- Qantas became the first airline to fly passengers over the continent of Antarctica, with a special charter flight organized by Australian aviator and entrepreneur Dick Smith. The charter, made on a Boeing 747-200B that departed from Sydney, took guests on a sightseeing tour before returning to Sydney. Air New Zealand made its own charter flight to Antarctica two days later. Both airlines would make multiple flights until the crash of a an Air New Zealand flight on November 28, 1979, killing all 257 people on board.
- Died: Manuel T. Gonzaullas, 85, Spanish born U.S. law enforcement officer and a captain of the Texas Rangers state police who was nicknamed "Lone Wolf" because of his record of successfully fighting battling outlaws without assistance.

== February 14, 1977 (Monday) ==
- Clifford Alexander, Jr., was confirmed as the first African American Secretary of the United States Army.
- The B-52's, a U.S. new wave music band, formed by a group of friends in Athens, Georgia, played their first concert together, for a Valentine's Day concert.
- Veselin Djuranovic, who had fought as part of Yugoslavian President Tito's Partizan Brigade during World War II, was nominated by Tito to be the new prime minister of Yugoslavia to succeed the late Dzemal Bijedic. Djuranovic was unanimously approved by Tito and the other 8 members of Yugoslavia's collective state presidency.
- A recently suspended employee of the Neptune Worldwide Moving Company, known for collecting Nazi war souvenirs and trained as a U.S. Army sharpshooter, committed a workplace shooting. Cowan, a member of the National States' Rights Party, killed four co-workers (three who were black, and the other a dark-skinned immigrant) and a white patrolman in New Rochelle, New York. After local police and FBI agents arrived, Freddie Cowan shot and wounded three of the police and held the group at bay for more than six hours before killing himself.
- Born:
  - François Perrodo, French oil and gas billionaire and chairman of Perenco, collector of automobiles; to French parents in Singapore
  - Cadel Evans, Australian professional cyclist, 2011 Tour de France and 2010 Giro d'Italia winner; in Katherine, Northern Territory
  - Jim Jefferies (stage name for Geoff James Nugent), Australian-born comedian; in Sydney
- Died: Joseph Moncure March, 77, American poet known for two book-length narrative poems, The Wild Party (1926) and The Set-Up (1928)

== February 15, 1977 (Tuesday) ==
- All 98 people aboard Aeroflot Flight 5003 were killed in the Soviet Union when the Ilyushin Il-18 turboprop crashed during an attempted a landing at Mineralnye Vody in the Russian SFSR. The flight had departed earlier from Tashkent, capital of the Uzbek SSR, and stopped at the Uzbek city of Nukus before crashing into an embankment near the Mineralnye Vody airport.
- Edwin John Eastwood, who had escaped from Geelong Prison on December 16, 1976, after being incarcerated for the 1972 Faraday School kidnapping in Australia, repeated the crime by taking 16 adults and nine children hostage after invading the Wooreen State School near Leongatha, Victoria. One hostage escaped and alerted police in Woodside, and the hostages were rescued, unharmed.
- Voting was held in Denmark for all 179 seats of the Folketingnet, the European kingdom's unicameral parliament. The Socialdemokratiet party of Prime Minister Anker Jørgensen gained 12 seats to reach 65, but the Social Democrats partner in a coalition government, the liberal Venstre Party, lost 21 seats, reducing the coalition from 95 seats to 86, short of the 90 needed for a majority. The opposition Fremskridtspartiet (Progress Party) finished second on a platform of abolishing all taxes, despite the admission by party leader Mogens Glistrup, who admitted that he paid no income tax at all.
- Italy's most wanted fugitive, Renato Vallanzasca, was captured alive almost seven months after escaping prison, after being tracked down at his hideout in Rome. Vallanzasca, who had committed 70 robberies, kidnapped four people and murdered six others since his escape, had most recently killed two highway patrolmen near Dalmine after they had stopped his car on February 6.
- The Canadian Citizenship Act of 1976 (Loi sur la citoyenneté) came into force in Canada, repealing the Canadian Citizenship Act, 1946 removing restrictions against having citizenship in more than one country.
- Died:
  - H. J. Lam, 85, Dutch botanist for whom the lamiodendron species of flowering plants is named
  - Matthews Mabelane, 23, black South African protester, plunged to his death from the 10th floor of the police station in Johannesburg. The circumstances were similar to the death of Ahmed Timol who had fallen 10 floors to his death on October 27, 1971 in what would be ruled in 2017 as a murder. As with Timol, police claimed that Mabelane had committed suicide after being arrested; unbeknownst to police, Mabelane had written a note to his family on the inside of his clothes while in his cell, saying "Brother Lasch, inform mom and other brothers that the police are going to push me from the 10th floor and I am bidding you goodbye forever."

== February 16, 1977 (Wednesday) ==
- In the central African nation of Uganda, three opponents of dictator Idi Amin were arrested and murdered. The Ugandan government then made an official statement that the victims had died in a motor vehicle accident. Janani Luwum, the Anglican Archbishop of Uganda was taken into custody in Kampala, along with Interior Minister Charles Ofumbi and Housing Minister Erinayo Oryema. The three were taken to a public rally and accused of plotting a coup d'etat as agents of former president Milton Obote. The next day, Radio Uganda announced that Luwum, Ofumbi and Oryema had been killed in a car crash while on their way to interrogation. When the men's families were delivered the remains for burial, however, multiple bullet wounds were visible on the bodies. The murder of the three climaxed two weeks of terror in which as many as 1,000 Ugandans were killed.
- As part of its apartheid policy of racial segregation, the white-minority government of South Africa ordered private Roman Catholic schools to expel their nonwhite students by the end of the week. The schools refused to reverse their policy of integration of white, black and mixed race students, despite threats to have their educational institutions "de-registered".
- Died:
  - Rózsa Péter, 51, Hungarian mathematician and co-founder of computability theory and the first woman to be elected to the Hungarian Academy of Sciences. She died of an illness one day before her 52nd birthday.
  - Princess Vibhavadi Rangsit, 56, Thai novelist and member of royalty, was killed when her helicopter was shot down by anti-government insurgents in Thailand's Surat Thani province.
  - Carlos Pellicer, 80, Mexican poet

== February 17, 1977 (Thursday) ==
- In Indonesia, Mayora, one of the world's largest food and beverage companies, was founded in Tangerang by Jogi Hendra Atmadja, an immigrant from Iran.
- Helen Brach, the 65-year-old multimillonaire heiress to the Brach's candy company fortune, disappeared after a routine checkup at the Mayo Clinic in Rochester, Minnesota. Mrs. Brach had planned to fly in a commercial airliner to her home near Chicago, but did not show up for the flight. She was not seen in public again, and her fate remained unknown to investigators more than 40 years later. She would be declared legally dead by a court in 1984.

== February 18, 1977 (Friday) ==
- The 61st Regiment Farm fire killed 694 people in the People's Republic of China, of whom 597 were schoolchildren who were watching a film. The blaze in the village of Alimali in China's Xinjiang province began at 8:15 in the evening during the Chinese New Year celebrations after a child threw a firecracker that ignited a pile of wreaths left over from the mourning in September for Chairman Mao Zedong. The fire came while an audience was a North Korean film, Chŏnu, shown in conjunction with the Chinese "Resist America and Assist Korea" campaign. The victims were unable to exit the poorly designed festival hall.
- The first test flight of the American space shuttle program took place as the Space Shuttle Enterprise was attached to the Shuttle Carrier Aircraft, a Boeing 747 jet airplane designed to carry the spacecraft. The 747 shuttle carrier took off from Edwards Air Force Base as part of the evaluation of the shuttle's aerodynamics and then landed again.
- Terrorists in Argentina made the third assassination attempt, in less than a year, on the life of President Jorge Rafael Videla. Videla, along with his Minister of Economy and several other people lifted off from the airport at Buenos Aires in the presidential airplane, a Fokker 28 twinjet, several seconds before a large bomb exploded near the same runway. The plane had only reached an altitude of 160 feet (49 m) when the bomb, loaded with chunks of iron and buckshot, exploded and left a crater. Unsuccessful attempts on Videla's life had been made in March and in October 1976.
- The government of Spain continued its transition to democracy, legalizing seven political parties, including two Marxist-Leninist organizations, the Spanish Socialist Workers' Party and the Popular Socialist Party. The Spanish Communist Party still remained illegal.
- Born:
  - László Nemes, Hungarian film director and screenwriter known for Son of Saul; in Budapest
  - Ike Barinholtz, American comedian and TV actor known for MADtv and The Mindy Project; in the Rogers Park neighborhood of Chicago
- Died: Andy Devine, 71, American character actor on television and film, generally portraying the sidekick to the hero

== February 19, 1977 (Saturday) ==
- At the 1977 Grammy Awards, Stevie Wonder won in four different categories, bringing his total of Grammy Awards to 14. Wonder was voted best male pop music singer, best male R & B singer, and best producer, while his recording Songs in the Key of Life was voted the top album of 1976. Linda Ronstadt won the award for best female singer.
- In France, the 2nd César Awards for French film were presented by the Académie des Arts et Techniques du Cinéma.
- At the Metropolitan Opera in New York City's Lincoln Center, thousands of people planning to see the Francis Poulenc opera Dialogues of the Carmelites had to leave The Met after an aerosol can of tear gas exploded on an escalator. Nobody was injured, but several persons received emergency room treatment of irritation of the eyes and throat.
- Born:
  - Gianluca Zambrotta, Italian footballer and right-back with 98 caps for the Italy national team; in Como, Lombardy
  - Luis Piedrahita, Spanish Galician comedian; in La Coruña
- Died:
  - Anthony Crosland, 58, the Foreign Secretary for the United Kingdom since 1976, died five days after suffering a fatal stroke at his home in Adderbury, Oxfordshire.
  - Joe Roth, 21, American college football star for the University of California and 1976 Heisman Trophy candidate, died of terminal cancer from a melanoma.
  - Anna Johnson Dupree, 85, African-American philanthropist

== February 20, 1977 (Sunday) ==
- Both major candidates in the presidential election in El Salvador claimed victory, although General Carlos Humberto Romero of the ruling National Conciliation Party (PCN) had more than twice as many votes as Colonel Ernesto Antonio Claramount of the National Opposition Union (UNO).
- The Protection of Diplomats Convention (officially the "United Nations Convention on the Prevention and Punishment of Crimes Against Internationally Protected Persons, Including Diplomatic Agents") came into effect after being ratified by 22 nations.
- Born:
  - Gail Kim, Canadian-born American professional wrestler and WWE Diva champion; in Toronto
  - Stephon Marbury, American National Basketball Association basketball player 1996 to 2009, Chinese Basketball Association player 2010 to 2019 and head coach 2019 to present; in Coney Island neighborhood of Brooklyn

== February 21, 1977 (Monday) ==
- In the U.S., a maintenance man was killed while repairing a blade in a large industrial blender at the Food-Maker, Inc. plant in San Diego when another employee tripped and fell against the starter button. Richard Wesson, 49, died of multiple injuries and internal bleeding.
- Born:
  - Steve Francis, U.S. NBA basketball point guard, co-winner of the 1999-2000 Rookie of the Year award; in Takoma Park, Maryland
  - Cyrine Abdelnour, Lebanese singer, actress and model; in Abadiyeh
  - Jonathan Safran Foer, American novelist; in Washington, D.C.
- Died:
  - Henry Jordan, 42, American pro football player and NFL defensive tackle from 1957 to 1969, died while jogging in Milwaukee. He would be posthumously inducted into the Pro Football Hall of Fame in 1985.
  - John Hubley, 62, American film animator and director known for creating the cartoon character Mr. Magoo, and winner of three Academy Awards, died during heart surgery.
  - Bertram Wolfe, 81, American Communist and political scholar, died from burns sustained after accidentally setting his bathrobe on fire.

== February 22, 1977 (Tuesday) ==
- In the British House of Commons, prospects of approval of a law to give Scotland and Wales limited home rule were ended by a filibuster. In an attempt by the governing Labour Party to end delay tactics and get a vote from the members, a "guillotine motion" (similar to a resolution of cloture in the U.S.) failed, with 283 votes in favor and 312 against, when 35 Labour members either abstained or voted against the motion.
- Mohammed Fadel, President of Damascus University in Syria, was shot and killed by an assassin as he arrived for work.
- Born: Hakan Yakin, Swiss footballer and midfielder with 87 caps for the Switzerland national team; to Turkish parents in Basel

== February 23, 1977 (Wednesday) ==
- Rhodesia's white prime minister, Ian Smith, leader of a racial minority government where whites received preferential treatment under the law despite being less than 5% of the population (275,000 out of 6,275,000), proposed his own transition to black majority rule. Smith proposed that "black Rhodesians" would be allowed to become military officers, be employed in government at all levels and to buy businesses in commercial areas, as well as being allowed to drink alcohol in white areas after 7:00 in the evening. Under Smith's plan, private schools and hospitals institutions would not be restricted from integrating, but state-owned schools would remain segregated, and black residents would be limited to buying farmland in only one-third of the areas reserved for white people.
- Óscar Romero, an outspoken opponent of violence, became the Roman Catholic Archbishop of San Salvador in El Salvador. Romero would be assassinated three years later during Mass by a right-wing Salvadoran death squad.
- Born: Kristina Šmigun-Vähi, Estonian cross-country skier and 2006 Olympic gold medalist; in Tartu, Estonian SSR, Soviet Union

== February 24, 1977 (Thursday) ==
- Israel's Prime Minister Yitzhak Rabin narrowly won his bid to remain in charge of the Labor Party, defeating Defense Minister Shimon Peres, 1,445 votes to 1,404 in voting by delegates at the nominating convention in advance of the May 17 Knesset election. Less than two months later, Rabin would resign in a scandal and be replaced on April 8 by Peres, and the Labor Party would lose in May to the Likud Party of Menachem Begin.
- Republican Party members of the U.S. Congress borrowed an idea from the United Kingdom and announced formation of a "shadow cabinet" with counterparts to the secretaries in President Jimmy Carter's Democrat cabinet.
- The Soviet Union announced that it would begin enforcing its own fishing zone 200 miles (320 km) from its coast lines, within which foreign trawlers would not be allowed to fish unless their nation's government permitted the same rights to the Soviet Union." The enforcement date, March 1, 1977, coincided with that of the United States.
- U.S. labor leader Al Bramlet, who had been president of the Nevada branch of the AFL–CIO for ten years, disappeared shortly after landing at the McCarran International Airport in Las Vegas on a flight from Reno. Bramlet had called his daughter at 4:30 p.m. to say he would be home in 20 minutes, but never made it to his car in the airport parking lot. Bramlet's body would be found in the Nevada desert three weeks later, 45 miles (72 km) southwest of Las Vegas.
- Born:
  - Floyd Mayweather Jr., American professional boxer and NASCAR team owner; WBC superfeatherweight champion 1998-2002; WBC lightweight champion 2002-2005; WBC and IBF super lightweight champion 2005-2007; IBF, IBO and WBC welterweight champ 2006-2007; WBC light middleweight champion 2007-2011; WBA super light middleweight champ 2012-2015; WBA, WBC and WBO welterweight champ 2015-2017, and the highest paid athlete in the world from 2012 to 2015; as Floyd Joy Sinclair in Grand Rapids, Michigan
  - Bronson Arroyo, American baseball player and 2010 Gold Glove winner, in Key West, Florida

== February 25, 1977 (Friday) ==
- A fire that broke out on the 13th floor of Moscow's Rossiya Hotel killed 42 guests and employees, and injured 52 others. At the time, the Rossiya was the largest in the world with 3,182 rooms. The number of casualties was exacerbated by the lack of enough exits in the hotel. Within the Soviet Union, only one newspaper, "Evening Moscow", mentioned the fire and devoted 17 lines on the bottom of page 3 under the headline "Information", while the nation's major newspapers, Pravda and Izvestia ignored it completely.
- The first parliamentary voting in more than 12 years was held in Algeria for the Majlis. Although the National Liberation Front was the only legal political party, there were 783 candidates for the 261 seats.
- Uganda's President Idi Amin announced that the 240 Americans living in the central African nation would not be allowed to leave, and ordered the U.S. citizens to report on February 28 to meet with him in Kampala. A second broadcast by Radio Uganda gave assurances that the Americans would not be arrested or harmed. The U.S. Navy responded by sending ships in the Indian Ocean to cruise off of the coast of East Africa. Amin reversed his order on March 1 without military intervention.
- The Soviet Soyuz 24 space mission returned to earth with cosmonauts Viktor Gorbatko and Yuri Glazkov, after 17 days in space and the reactivation of the orbiting Salyut space station for the first time in six months.
- Died:
  - Robert P. McCulloch, 65, American industrialist known for founding the McCulloch chainsaw company; creating the communities of Lake Havasu City, Arizona(1963), Pueblo West, Colorado (1970), Fountain Hills, Arizona and Spring Creek, Nevada; and purchasing and moving the London Bridge, and rebuilding it in Lake Havasu City, Arizona. McCulloch's death was attributed to a combination of barbiturates and alcohol in conjunction with severe arteriosclerosis.
  - Patricia Haines, 45, English TV actress, died of lung cancer
  - Tahjar Ederis (professional name for The Teng Chun), Indonesian film producer
  - Tewodros Bekele, Ethiopian labor union organizer and founder weeks earlier of the All-Ethiopia Trade Union (AETU), was assassinated.

== February 26, 1977 (Saturday) ==
- An attack by the National Liberation Front of Angola (FNLA) killed 43 people and wounded 25 in the village of Pangola, located in Angola near its border with Zaire, which had harbored FNLA rebels after their defeat in the Angolan Civil War. On March 8, the Marxist government of Angola retaliated by supporting anti-Zairean rebels of the National Front for the Liberation of the Congo in invasion of Zaire's Shaba Province.
- The Union of Ethiopian Marxist–Leninist Organizations (known by its Amharic language acronym Imaledih) was founded by the merger of five Communist organizations, the All-Ethiopian Socialist Movement (Meison), the Ethiopian Oppressed People's Revolutionary Struggle (Ichat), the Ethiopian Marxist-Leninist Revolutionary Organization (Malerid), the Waz League and Revolutionary Flame (Seded).
- Khondaker Mostaq Ahmad, who had served as President of Bangladesh for three months in 1975, was sentenced to five years in prison for corruption associated with renovations to buildings in his home village of Comilla.
- Players and fans at the Bent Tree Classic, the third event on the 1977 LPGA Tour for the Ladies Professional Golf Association, had to run for cover from bullets flying past them, and play was suspended for 30 minutes to investigate the source. The gunshots were traced to a home in Sarasota, Florida, where a man "had been shooting at a wooden target in his backyard, not realizing that the bullets were carrying to the golf course about a third of a mile away."
- Born:
  - Shane Williams, Welsh rugby union player with 87 appearances for the Wales national team, 2008 World Rugby Player of the Year; in Morriston, Swansea
  - James Wan, Malaysian-born Australian director and screenwriter
  - Koxie (stage name for Laure Cohen), French pop singer; in Neuilly-sur-Seine, Hauts-de-Seine département
- Died:
  - Lotte Neumann (stage name for Charlotte Pötler), 80, German film actress and screenwriter
  - Allison Hayes, 46, American film and TV actress and model, died of leukemia.

== February 27, 1977 (Sunday) ==
- Keith Richards, guitarist for the Rolling Stones, was arrested by the Royal Canadian Mounted Police in his hotel room at Toronto's Harbour Castle Hilton and charged with "possession of heroin for the purpose of trafficking." After posting bond, he was detained in Toronto until April 1, when he was allowed to enter the U.S. for drug treatment, and the charges were subsequently reduced to possession of heroin.
- At slightly more than 16 years old, Diego Maradona made his debut for the Argentina national team in international soccer football play, appearing at a game against Hungary.
- Born:
  - Ben Green, British mathematician known for the Green–Tao theorem; in Bristol
  - Ji Sung (stage name for Kwak Tae-geun), South Korean TV actor and singer; in Seoul
- Died: John Dickson Carr, 70, American mystery novelist known for the Gideon Fell series of 23 books (1933-1967) and (under the pen name Carter Dickson), the Sir Henry Merrivale mysteries from 1934 to 1953

== February 28, 1977 (Monday) ==
- In San Salvador, a crowd of 2,000 people, led by defeated candidate Ernesto Antonio Claramount gathered in the main plaza to protesting fraud in the February 20 elections for president in El Salvador. Salvadoran troops and police ordered the demonstrators to disperse and fired into the crowd, with the government admitting to killing six people and wounding 52 although the actual number was at least 200 civilians and possibly as many as 1,500
- The collision of two commuter trains near Barcelona killed 22 people and injured 97 in Spain.
- Queen Elizabeth II of the United Kingdom, acting in her capacity as Queen of New Zealand, opened the nation's Parliament as part of her tour of the British Commonwealth of Nations.
- Born:
  - Jason Aldean (stage name for Jason Aldine Williams), American country music singer; in Macon, Georgia
  - Rafael Amaya, award-winning Mexican TV actor known for El Señor de los Cielos; in Hermosillo, Sonora state

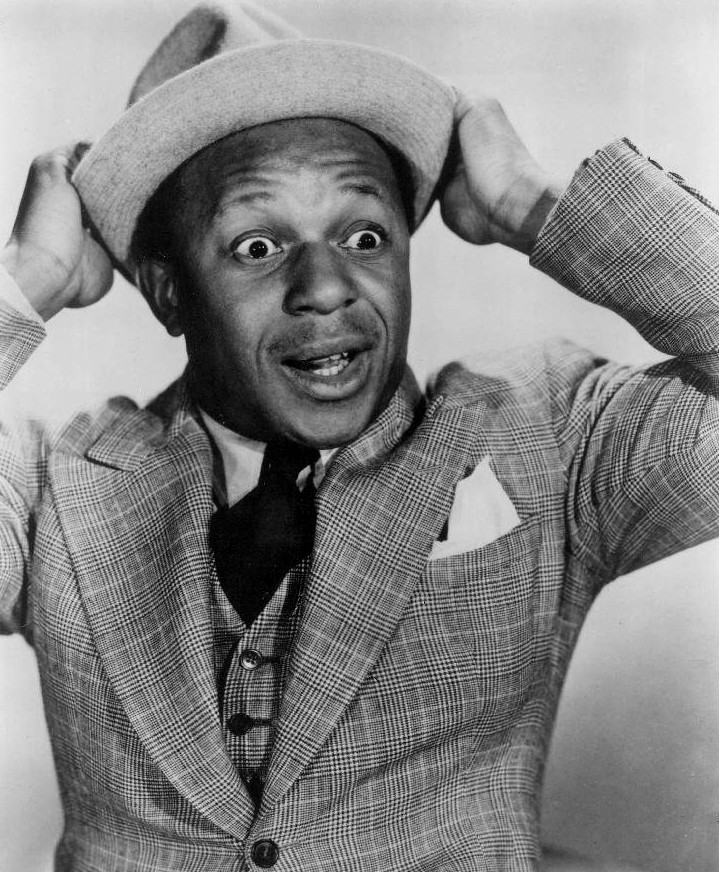
Anderson

- Died: Eddie Anderson, 71, African-American radio and TV comedian and actor who co-starred as "Rochester" on The Jack Benny Program with Jack Benny and Mary Livingstone.
