= Waz League =

1975–1979 communist political party in Ethiopia

Waz League The Labour League
- Founder: Sennai Likkay
- Founded: 1975
- Dissolved: 1979
- Ideology: Communism; Marxism–Leninism
- National affiliation: Imaledih

The Labour League (Amharic: የወዛደር ሊግ), generally known by its Amharic name Waz (Amharic: ወዝ) or the hybrid name Waz League (Amharic: ወዝ ሊግ), was a Marxist organization in Ethiopia active between 1975 and 1979, allied with the Derg military junta. Waz League was founded by Dr. Sennai Likkay, a veteran leader of the student movement (graduate in chemical engineering in the United States and former president of the Ethiopian Students Union of North America).

== Description ==
The Waz League claimed a working-class base and shared the populist tendencies of the Ethiopian People's Revolutionary Party. The programme of the Waz League was published in April 1976. Regarding the national question, Waz argued in favour of a regional autonomy formula.

Sennai Likkay served as vice chairman of the 15-member Central Committee of the Provisional Office for Mass Organizational Affairs (POMOA). The Waz League supported the entry of the Seded (the new political organization formed by Derg officers) into POMOA, as means of weakening influence of the All-Ethiopia Socialist Movement (MEISON). On February 26, 1977, the Waz League and four other organizations (MEISON, Seded, Echat and Malerid) founded the Union of Ethiopian Marxist-Leninist Organizations. Sennai Likkay was killed in a shoot-out in the same month (Teferi Banti was killed in the same incident).

However, relations between the Derg and the Waz League went sour. Mengistu began to allege that individuals of the Waz League were working against the revolution. In the second half of 1978 suspicions were raised that the Waz League had infiltrated Seded and come to occupy leading posts in Seded. It was, however, unlikely that the Waz League would have been able to penetrate the inner circle of military leaders of Seded.

Following the break between the Derg and the Waz League, the Waz League was purged. During the purge, the Waz League was denounced as 'Maoist' by the Derg. On July 10, 1978, Berhane Meskel (captured in Mehaberete) and other Waz League leaders were executed. However whilst some Waz League leaders were killed, others were promoted for supposedly having helped uncover the infiltration plot.

Several former members of the Waz League later became prominent Workers' Party of Ethiopia leaders. Shimelis Mazengia, Mengistu's speech writer and credited with the invention of many Amharic versions of Marxist terminology, was a former Waz League activist. The Workers' Party of Ethiopia politburo had three former Waz League members; Shimelis Mazengia, Shewandagne Belete (a former POMOA member) and Fasika Sidelil. Two other prominent ex-Waz League figures were Maj Girma Neway (a senior police officer) and Roberto Gigano.
