= Nebiy Mekonnen =

Ethiopian poet, journalist, playwright, and translator (1956–2024)

- Born: 1956; Nazret, Shewa, Ethiopian Empire
- Died: 3 July 2024 (aged 67–68); Adama, Oromia Region, Ethiopia
- Occupations: Journalist; playwright; translator
- Known for: Translating Gone with the Wind; Editor-in-chief of the Addis Admass
- Notable work: Negem Lela Ken New; Tomorrow; Another Day
- Political party: Ethiopian People's Revolutionary Party
- Writing career
- Language: Amharic; English; French

Nebiy Mekonnen (1956 – 3 July 2024) was an Ethiopian poet, journalist, playwright, and translator. He was also the co-founder and editor-in-chief of the weekly newspaper Addis Admas. He is known for translating Gone with the Wind into Amharic onto three thousand cigarette-paper pieces while imprisoned. His translation is titled Negem Lela Ken New (in Amharic) or Tomorrow is Another Day (in English). At the time of its publication, it was one of the longest books ever published in Amharic.

He was a member of the Ethiopian Peoples' Revolutionary Party and was imprisoned for nearly eight years, from 1977 to 1985, during the Derg Regime's Red Terror. Some of Nebiy Mekonnen's poems have been translated into English and French.

Nebiy was also famous for writing observations. His series published in Addis Admas entitled Yegna Sew Beamerika (An Ethiopian in the U.S.) was a well-read series that was eagerly anticipated every week on his paper. He died on 3 July 2024.
