= Abdullahi Yousuf =

Ethiopian politician (died 1977)

Abdullahi Yousuf (died 1977) was an Oromo politician, a member of the All-Ethiopian Socialist Movement (Meison).

Abdullahi Yousuf was active in the leftist Union of Ethiopian Students in Europe, along with Haile Fida. During their student years Haile Fida and Abdullahi Yousuf made significant contributions to the development of Afaan Oromoo as a written language. During the early years of the Ethiopian Revolution, he was appointed head of the Provisional Office for Mass Organizational Affairs in Hararghe. As a POMOA leader, he disarmed Shoan Christian settlers and implemented land reform in Hararghe.

Abdullahi Yousuf was killed in August 1977 during a visit to Addis Ababa. The murder occurred in the midst of the break between Meison and the Derg.
