= Haile Fida =

Ethiopian politician (1939–1979)

Haile Fida Haaylee Fidaa
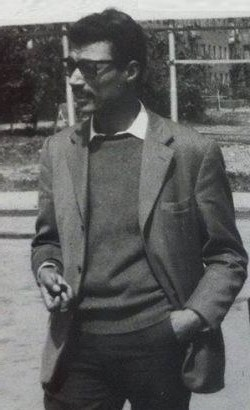

Chairman of the All-Ethiopia Socialist Movement
- In office Late 1960 – 14 July 1977

Chairman of the Provisional Office for Mass Organizational Affairs
- In office 2 December 1975 – 14 July 1977

Personal details
- Born: c. 4 April 1939 Arjo, (now Oromia Region, Ethiopia)
- Died: c. 4 April 1979 (aged 40) Addis Ababa, Ethiopia
- Party: All-Ethiopia Socialist Movement
- Education: Institut Universitaire de France; Addis Ababa University; General Wingate Secondary School

Haile Fida (Amharic: ኃይሌ ፊዳ, Oromo: Haaylee Fidaa, c. 4 April 1939 – c. 4 April 1979) was an Ethiopian politician and the leader of the All-Ethiopia Socialist Movement (popularly known as "MEISON", after its Amharic abbreviation መኢሶን). His most significant accomplishment was drafting the Program for the National Democratic Revolution on behalf of the Derg.

== Early life ==
Haile Fida was born in Arjo, Ethiopia and grew up in the town of Nekemte. Haile Fida studied in France during the early 1960s, and during his studies he had acquired a Marxist ideology that was closer to the Soviet version than to the New Left; Haile studied towards an MA in sociology and social anthropology and PhD in philosophy at the Institut Universitaire de France. Rene LeFort states that he was a fellow-traveller of the French Communist Party.

He returned to Ethiopia soon after the start of the Ethiopian Revolution, sometime in 1975, having answered the Derg's appeal for all educated Ethiopians to return home to help modernize the country. With Negede Gobeze, who had also been studying abroad in France, he opened the "Progressive Book Store" near the campus of Haile Selassie University (now Addis Ababa University), which made the basic texts of Marxism-Leninism available to Ethiopians. "The store", as described by the Ottaways, "[was] a dilapidated old house, was swamped by students, and each new shipment of books was immediately sold out."

== Political career ==
He soon came to the notice of not only the Derg, who were in need of both civilian supporters and advisers in Marxist-Leninist theory - but as well as to the notice of its leading member, Mengistu Haile Mariam. In December 1975, the Derg secretly created what became known as the Provisional Office for Mass Organizational Affairs (POMOA), and Haile Fida was made its chairman. The goal of POMOA was not only to build support amongst the general public, but to reach out to other leftist civilians. It was while chairman of POMOA that Haile Fida drafted the Program of National Democratic Revolution, a document which replaced the patriotic but vague motto Itiopiya Tikdem ("Ethiopia first") the Derg had used as their guiding principles with a Maoist vision for Ethiopia.

Relying on the revolutionary alliance of the proletariat, the peasantry and the progressive petit-bourgeoisie, the trinity of feudalism, imperialism and bureaucratic capitalism would be destroyed and eventually a People's Democratic Republic of Ethiopia established. Mengistu announced the adoption of the National Democratic Revolution at a mass demonstration 20 April 1976.

However, the POMOA failed to connect with the civilian opposition. Along with disaffected zamecha members who had abandoned their assigned tasks in the countryside and found their way back home, the opposition had come to support the Ethiopian People's Revolutionary Party (EPRP), greatly increasing its numbers and influence. While MEISON supported the Derg, the EPRP attacked the Derg, accusing them of having crushed the popular movement which had been ruthlessly crushed by military intervention; the only correct socialist line was to continue the struggle for a true people's government against the repressive Derg.

Despite their bitter disagreement over what role the Derg should play in controlling the Ethiopia Revolution, both the MEISON and EPRP "published strikingly similar programs". According to the Ottaways, who were witnesses to this debate, "most Ethiopians, even educated ones" were left confused. They explain:

The entire Ethiopia intelligentsia was forced to immerse itself in Marxism-Leninism, Whether individuals believed in it or not. The authors [i.e. the Ottaways] met Ethiopian university professors who were wholly confused by political arguments and had to ransack the classics in search of enlightenment. Third and fourth year university students would provide us with excellent literal translations of articles in Addis Zemen and of underground pamphlets and then confess that they had little idea what the arguments were really about. Even those in charge of translations at the Ethiopian News Agency admitted that they could not always grasp the meaning of the more theoretical government statements emanating from the Political Bureau.

Meanwhile, Fida strengthened his ties with the Derg. August 1975, he joined Sisay Hapte, chairman of the Derg's Political Affairs Committee, in negotiating with six Arab countries over the increasing problems with Eritrea.

Unable to defeat each other with words, the opposing groups resorted to violence. The first victim was Theodore Bekele, MEISON member and leader of the All-Ethiopia Trade Union, who was killed 25 February 1977. (Note: Rene LeFort notes, however, that it is possible Theodore was assassinated by a commando group in pay of Abiotawi Seded, a group founded by Mengistu.) This was the start of the Red Terror, during which hundreds died and ended with the defeat of the EPRP; the few who survived fled Addis Ababa for Mount Asimba.

Despite the departure of the EPRP, conditions did not improve for either Haile Fida or MEISON. On 10 July 1976, a coup to remove Mengistu failed, and Sisay Hapte, who had been the Derg's chief liaison with the civilian Left, was executed three days later along with over 17 accomplices. Then towards the end of 1976, a struggle broke out between Mengistu and MEISON, after which Mengistu began to systematically replace all of its members in the government. Tensions increased when 11 March 1977 in a ministerial reshuffle MEISON failed to acquire any positions. Then on 14 July management of POMOA was taken from the party. Haile Fida and the rest of MEISON knew that the next blow would be bloody, and acted first: on 19 August the leading figures of MEISON and some 500 cadres went underground. Mengistu denounced the party in a speech five days later, and on 26 August Haile Fida with several other leaders were captured outside of Addis Ababa, and detained in the Old Gebbi, where the Derg had made its headquarters; a number of the other MEISON leaders were killed either on the spot or in subsequent shoot-outs. Only Negede Gobeze managed to escape the Derg, and found sanctuary in Yemen.

Haile Fida remained in prison for some time, until at last he was executed; the circumstances of his conditions are unclear, but Andargachew Tiruneh states that he was killed two years after his arrest, in 1979.

== Selected works ==
- Languages in Ethiopia: Latin or Geez for Writing Afan Oromo, Tatek, 1972
- Hirmaata Dubbi Afaan Oromoo. Paris, 1973
- Barra Birraan Barihe. Paris
