= Coalition of Ethiopian Democratic Forces =

Former political coalition in Ethiopia

- Abbreviation: COEDF
- Founded: Late 1980s
- Ideology: Socialism; Anti-Mengistu; Factions: Social democracy Communism
- Political position: Left-wing
- National affiliation: MEISON; EPRP

The Coalition of Ethiopian Democratic Forces (abbreviated COEDF) was a political coalition in Ethiopia, formed by former arch-rivals MEISON and the Ethiopian People's Revolutionary Party during the final phase of the Derg regime. Marsa Yosef (a key EPRP leader) served as the chairman of COEDF.

During the transitional period after the fall of the Derg, TPLF and EPRDF excluded COEDF from the Council of Representatives. Notably COEDF lacked any military force of its own as a means of pressure.
