= Ethiopian People's Revolutionary Youth League =

The Ethiopian People's Revolutionary Youth League (EPRYL) was a youth organization in Ethiopia. EPRYL was the youth wing of the Ethiopian People's Revolutionary Party (EPRP). After the 1974 revolution, a significant anti-Derg/pro-EPRP movement had emerged from the high school students in the student movement, out of which EPRP created EPRYL. EPRYL membership was open to youth aged 15 to 25 years. EPRYL was the most significant mass organization of EPRP. The organization was decimated in the Red Terror.
