= Provisional Office for Mass Organizational Affairs =

1975–1979 political organization in Ethiopia

Provisional Office for Mass Organizational Affairs የሕዝብ ጽሕፈት ጊዜያዊ ጽሕፌት ቤት
- Chairperson: Haile Fida
- Governing body: Supreme Organizing Committee
- Standing Committee: Mass Political Education and Co-ordinating Committee
- Vice chairperson: Sennai Likkai
- Founded: December 1975
- Dissolved: December 1979
- Newspaper: Abiotawit Ityopya (አብዮታዊ ኢትዮጵያ)
- Ideology: Communism; Marxism-Leninism

The Provisional Office for Mass Organizational Affairs (Amharic: የሕዝብ ጽሕፈት ጊዜያዊ ጽሕፌት ቤት, abbreviated POMOA) was a political organization in Ethiopia active between 1975 and 1979. POMOA functioned as a forum to involve different Marxist-Leninist organizations in the revolutionary process and to politicize and organize the masses.

== Foundation ==
POMOA was set up through a decree of the Derg military junta in December 1975. The existence of POMOA was publicly revealed on April 21, 1976 following the announcement of the National Democratic Revolution Programme. Initially the organization was known as the People's Organizing Provisional Office. The organization was conceptualized not as a political party, but as a "popular revolutionary front". The Yekatit '66 Political School, an institution under the supervision of POMOA, trained political cadres. POMOA functioned as a government department, and received allocations from the state treasury. According to Kiflu Tadesse, POMOA had an annual budget of 7 million Birr.

== Leadership and structure ==
Through POMOA the Derg military junta received political support in the face of opposition from the Ethiopian People's Revolutionary Party (EPRP), especially through the building of organizational structures in the provinces. But the Derg was wary of the dominance of the All-Ethiopian Socialist Movement (Meison) over POMOA. As a means of keeping POMOA under check, Mengistu Haile Mariam employed tactics of playing out different POMOA factions against each other.

The leading body in POMOA was a 15-member committee. Its full name was the Mass Political Education and Co-ordinating Committee. It was commonly referred to as the 'Politburo', and had many scholars within its ranks. The Politburo and other POMOA structures were dominated by Meison. Haile Fida, the leader of Meison, was the chairman of POMOA. Sennai Likkai of the Waz League served as the vice chairman of the organization.

The activities of POMOA supervised by Supreme Organizing Committee, a body chaired by Mengistu himself.

Membership in POMOA was kept secret. Five political groups were active inside POMOA; Meison, Waz League, the Ethiopian Marxist-Leninist Revolutionary Organization (Malerid), Echat and Seded. The entry of Seded (the political faction started by the Derg military officers) caused controversy within the coalition. Two factions (Meison and Echat) opposed the entry of Seded into the alliance (seeing Seded as a threat to their influence in POMOA) whilst the other two (Malerid and Waz League) supported the integration of Seded. The different member organizations of POMOA conspired against each other, trying to place their own people in key positions inside POMOA. Haile Fida and Sennai Likkay competed over power in POMOA. In particular, the coalition was shaken by the power struggle between Meison and Seded.

POMOA had committees for ideology, organization and for running the Yekatit '66 Political School. POMOA built up organizational structures in the regions and provinces, and sometimes in the districts. The organization developed a network of some 4,000 political cadres in cells across the country. POMOA took control of the kebeles (urban dwellers associations), and turned them into vigilante bodies with militia squads under the supervision of POMOA.

POMOA published the biweekly newspaper Abiotawit Ityopya ('Revolutionary Ethiopia').

== White and Red Terror ==
On September 26, 1976, EPRP unleashed a campaign of assassinations against POMOA cadres. The first prominent victim of the EPRP assassination spree was Fikre Merid (Meison leader and POMOA Committee member), who was shot in his car in Addis Abeba. The campaign of Red Terror began in March 1977, as POMOA kebele militia squads and the army attacked the EPRP.

== Derg taking control of POMOA ==
In December 1976 the Derg issued proclamation 108/1976. The proclamation dissolved the Supreme Organizing Committee and brought POMOA under direct supervision of the Derg Standing Committee. A proclamation issued in February 1977 retained these provisions.

On July 14, 1977 the Derg issued a proclamation calling for POMOA to be put more strictly under its control. This move signaled a divide between Derg and Meison. In essence, the July proclamation served as a final warning to Meison. As POMOA was reorganized, the membership of the Politburo was reduced from 15 to five.

In August 1977 the head of POMOA in Hararghe and prominent Meison cadre, Abdullahi Yousuf, was killed during a visit in Addis Ababa. As regional POMOA chief, he had disarmed Shoan Christian settlers and implemented land reform in Hararghe.

Meison withdrew its support to the Derg in August 1977. POMOA continued to exist after the departure of Meison, but was now under military control. A Seded cadre, Lt. Desta Tadesse, became the new general secretary of POMOA. Militaries began occupying key positions in several regional units of POMOA. Seded cadres also took over the Yekatit '66 Political School. One after one, POMOA member organization were purged.

== Later period ==
POMOA was dissolved in December 1979 as the Commission for Organizing the Party of the Working People of Ethiopia (COPWE) was formed. Out of the 15 members of the original POMOA politburo, only two remained in active politics in 1984.
