= Commission for Organizing the Party of the Working People of Ethiopia =

Political party in Ethiopia (1979–1984)

Commission for Organizing the Party of the Working People of Ethiopia የኢትዮጵያ ሰራተኞች ፓርቲ አደራጅ ኮሚሽን
- Chairman: Mengistu Haile Mariam
- Founded: 17 December 1979
- Dissolved: 12 September 1984
- Preceded by: POMOA; Imaledih
- Succeeded by: Workers' Party of Ethiopia
- Headquarters: Addis Ababa
- Newspaper: Serto Ader
- Youth wing: Revolutionary Ethiopia Youth Association
- Women's wing: Revolutionary Ethiopia Women's Association
- Labour wing: All-Ethiopian Trade Union
- Peasant wing: All-Ethiopian Peasant Association
- Membership: 1,400,000
- Ideology: Communism; Marxism-Leninism; Pan-Africanism; African nationalism Socialist patriotism
- Slogan: "የአየር ሁኔታ ምንም ቢሆን፣ አብረን መንቀሳቀስ አለብን!" (“Whatever the weather, we must move together!”)

The Commission for Organizing the Party of the Working People of Ethiopia (Amharic: የኢትዮጵያ ሰራተኞች ፓርቲ አደራጅ ኮሚሽን, romanized: ye’ītiyop’iya seratenyochi paritī āderaji komīshini), generally known by its English acronym COPWE, was a political organization in Ethiopia during the rule of the Derg. COPWE was a preparty organization; it had the task of preparing the Ethiopian people for creation of a communist and Marxist-Leninist party. In the absence of a communist party, COPWE functioned as a temporary replacement of the party that it would create.

== Founding ==
The founding of COPWE was preceded by the banning of political organizations. The foundation of COPWE was declared through the proclamation 174 of the Derg military junta issued on December 17, 1979. Mengistu Haile Mariam was appointed as the chairman of the new organization. Mengistu declared the formation of COPWE in radio and television broadcasts on the same date. In his speech Mengistu stated that the Derg had always been aware of the need for a vanguard party, but that conditions had been lacking so far. COPWE would popularize Marxism-Leninism throughout the country, combat feudalism, imperialism and bureaucratic capitalism and lead the people towards socialism.

The proclamation that formed COPWE vested all powers in hands of the chairman Mengistu. Mengistu would be authorized to appoint members of the Central Committee, the Executive Committee (which later became the Politburo) and the Secretariat. Mengistu was empowered to issue rules for admission of individual members.

A party press was established, the party newspaper Serto Ader and the theoretical journal Meskerem.

The formation of COPWE was the culmination of the struggle between the Derg military junta and its political allies, a struggle that had taken place within Provisional Office for Mass Organizational Affairs (POMOA) and the Union of Ethiopian Marxist-Leninist Organizations (Imadelih). Compared to its predecessors, COPWE was something of a hybrid. It was in part a government department like POMOA (created through a government proclamation and funded through the state treasury) as well as a supposedly voluntary association like Imadelih. Notably, COPWE was able to establish a party cadre that remained stable throughout its existence.

== Leadership ==
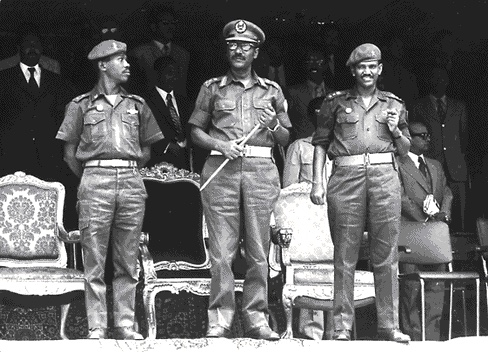
The leaders of Derg with a Mengistu on left, Tafari on middle and Atnafu on right, circa 1974-1977

The Executive Committee of COPWE consisted of seven senior Derg officers, who also constituted the Derg Standing Committee (Mengistu, Fikre Selassie Wogderes, Fisseha Desta, Tesfaye Gebre Kidan, Berhanu Bayih, Addis Tedla and Legesse Asfaw) as well as four civilians. The latter were nicknamed 'the Gang of Four'. The key member of the 'Gang of Four' was Shemelis Mazengia. The other three were Alemu Abebe, Fassika Sidell and Shewandagne Abebe. These four civilians were entrusted with running of the daily affairs of the party. The Executive Committee also had six alternate members.

The leading bodies of COPWE were dominated by people from the armed forces. Around two thirds of the Central Committee members had a military or police background. All 16 government ministers were members of the Central Committee (only one of them was an alternate member). Ato Hussein Ismail who was the first Somali to become a Politician in Ethiopia and lay the foundation for Somali inclusiveness into Ethiopia was also part of the Central Committee. There was only one woman, Tiruwork Wakoyo, in the Central Committee. Officially Fisseha Desta was the First Secretary of COPWE, but in practice Legesse Asfaw (Head of Organizational Affairs) led the Secretariat. The Secretariat consisted mainly of civilian ideologues, under the supervision of senior Derg members.

According to Peter Schwab, citing a 1980 article in the Ethiopian Herald, two thirds of the Central Committee members were Amharas.

== First Congress ==
The first congress of COPWE was held on June 16–19, 1980. The congress established the strengthening and politicizing of mass organizations as key priority. The All-Ethiopian Trade Union and the All-Ethiopian Peasants Association were to be reconstructed. The congress called for the founding of the Revolutionary Ethiopia Youth Association and the Revolutionary Ethiopia Women's Association.

== Organizational build-up ==
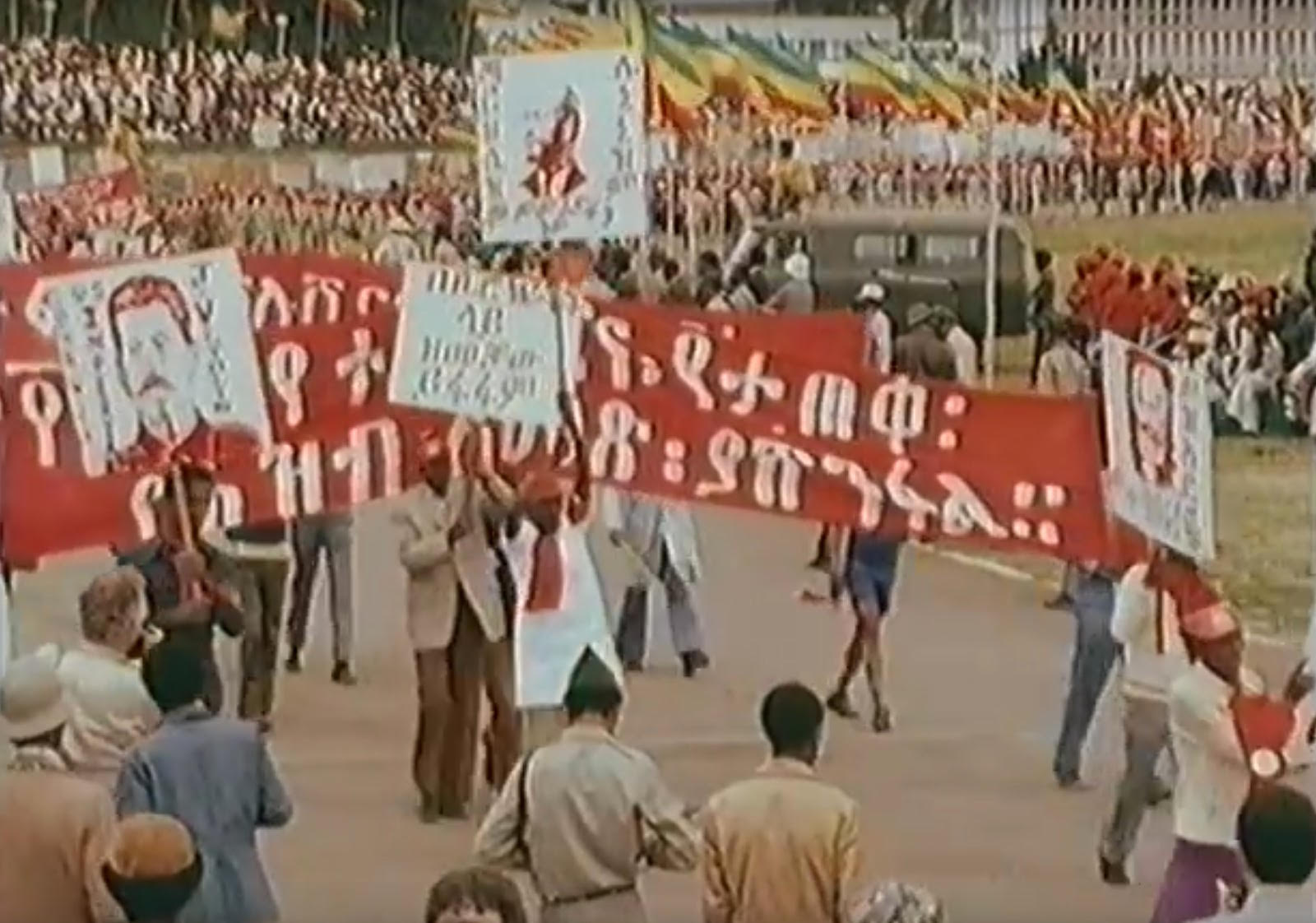
The parade with portraits of Stalin on left, Lenin on middle and Marx on right held by Pro-Derg of Youths, circa 1977-1978

The Central Committee met in plenary sessions once per year. The second plenary session of the COPWE Central Committee, held in February 1981, marked the first time after the 1974 military takeover than government policies were declared through a party organ rather than the Derg military junta. Regional COPWE representatives were appointed in June 1980, but except for Eritrea the appointed representatives were the incumbent military chief administrators. These two posts were separated in late 1981, thus establishing parallel party and state hierarchies in the regions. Only in Gonder was the regional representative, Melaku Tefera, a native of the area.

Elections to kebele (urban dwellers association) councils were held in 1981. All candidates were screened by COPWE prior to the vote.

COPWE then moved to create party structures on district levels. The first district organization was created in Assab in April 1981. The appointed district representative was Eshetu Aleme. Afterwards district organizations in Jimma and Dessie were set up. At the time of the second COPWE congress, half of the provinces had district-level party structures. By June 1982 there were 436 basic party units across the country. Out of them 162 were party units in the armed forces, down to brigade level.

== Soviet linkage ==
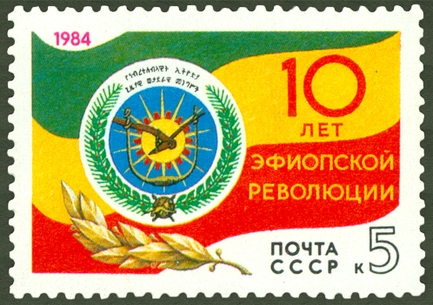
Soviet postage stamp marking the 10th anniversary of the Ethiopian Revolution, 1984

COPWE was modelled after the Communist Party of the Soviet Union. The organization also received support from its Soviet fraternal party, many COPWE party cadres obtained political education in the Soviet Union. But the Soviets grew impatient with the slow development of COPWE. The Soviets sent a large cache of Marxist literature to COPWE, hoping to improve its ideological level. The first cooperation agreement between COPWE and the Soviet Communist Party was signed on October 12, 1982.

== Second Congress and foundation of the Workers' Party ==
The second COPWE congress was held on January 3–6, 1983. Around 1,600 people attended the event. By this point the mass organizations of the party claimed a membership of 1.3 million. In his speech to the congress, Mengistu claimed that COPWE had been able to establish around 6,500 party cells throughout the country. The congress issued a call for the creation of the Workers' Party of Ethiopia. The new party was founded in September 12, 1984, substituting the COPWE.
