= Meskerem =

Meskerem መስከረም
- Cover of Amharic-language edition of Meskerem
- Editor-in-Chief: Amha Dagnew
- Categories: Political journal
- Frequency: Quarterly
- Publisher: Ideological Department of the Central Committee of the Commission for Organizing the Party of the Working People of Ethiopia
- Total circulation: 100,000
- First issue: September, 1980
- Final issue Number: June 1983; Vol. 3, No. 14
- Country: Ethiopia
- Language: Amharic, English

Meskerem (Amharic: መስከረም) was a communist theoretical publication published in Ethiopia, issued by the Ideological Department of the Central Committee of the Commission for Organizing the Party of the Working People of Ethiopia. The goal of Meskerem was to relate Marxist-Leninist theory to objective conditions in Ethiopia. Meskerem functioned mainly as an instrument for political education. Amha Dagnew was the editor-in-chief of Meskerem.

Meskerem was published quarterly. The first issue of Meskerem was published in September 1980 and the last issue (vol. 3, no. 14) was published in June 1983. Meskerem, which appeared in both Amharic and English versions, had a circulation of 100,000.
