= BGN/PCGN romanization of Korean =

Currently, BGN and PCGN romanize the Korean language using two systems:

- McCune–Reischauer in North Korea (BGN 1943, with PCGN soon to follow);
- Revised Romanization of Korean in South Korea (2011 agreement).
