= Hussein Ismail =

Somali Ethiopian politician

Honorable Ato Hussein Ismail አቶ ሁሴን እስማእል Xuseen Ismaaciil

Ambassador of Ethiopia to Bulgaria
- In office 1986 – not certain

Ambassador of Ethiopia to Cuba
- In office 1984–1986

Ambassador of Ethiopia to South Yemen
- In office 1983–1984

Commissioner for Pensions and Social security
- In office 1978–1983
- Preceded by: Araya Ougbagzi

Member of the Central Committee of COPWE
- In office 1979–1984

Minister of Education
- In office August 1976 – 1978

Chief-Administrator of Illubabor Province
- In office 1974–1976

Governor of Dire Dawa

Personal details
- Born: Dire Dawa, Ethiopia
- Profession: Politician, minister, commissioner and ambassador

Hussein Ismail or Husein Ismail (Somali: Xuseen Ismaaciil, Arabic: حسين إسماعيل, Amharic: አቶ ሁሴን እስማእል) also known as Ato Hussein Ismail was a Somali Ethiopian politician who held several spots in the Ethiopian government. He was the first Somali to be promoted to a minister, ambassador, Commissioner and politician in Ethiopia to the government of the Derg that ruled Ethiopia from 1974 to 1987.

== History ==
Hussein Ismail was born in Dire Dawa, Ethiopia and belongs to the Afugud or Gibril Muse (Afguduud), Makahil (Makahiil) section of the Gadabursi (Gadabuursi) or Samaron (Samaroon). He served his country as Chief-Administrator of the Illubabor Province in Ethiopia after the fall of Haile Selassie. Furthermore, he became Governor of Dire Dawa, Ambassador to South Yemen, Ambassador to Bulgaria, Ambassador to Cuba and Minister of Education and Commissioner for Pensions and Social Security for Ethiopia. He also was a member of the Central Committee of COPWE (Commission for Organizing the Party of the Working People of Ethiopia). He laid the foundation for Somali inclusiveness into Ethiopia.

=== Career ===
- Governor of Dire Dawa
- Chief-Administrator of Illubabor Province (1974–1976 )
- Minister of Education (August 1976 – 1978)
- Member of the Central Committee of COPWE (1979–1984)
- Commissioner for Pensions and Social Security (1978–1983)
- Ambassador of Ethiopia to South Yemen (1983–1984)
- Ambassador of Ethiopia to Cuba (1984–1986)
- Ambassador of Ethiopia to Bulgaria (1986)
