= Serto Ader =

Ethiopian newspaper

Serto Ader (Amharic: ሠርቶ ዐደር, 'Toilers') was an Amharic-language newspaper in Ethiopia, published from Addis Ababa. The newspaper was founded in June 1980, as the organ of the Central Committee of the Commission for Organizing the Party of the Working People of Ethiopia (COPWE). The newspaper sought to popularize Marxism-Leninism amongst the Ethiopian masses.

Serto Ader had a circulation of around 100,000. The newspaper was initially published fortnightly, but was converted into a weekly. Tesfaye Tadese served as editor of the newspaper, Gezahegn Gebre as deputy editor.

When the Workers' Party of Ethiopia was founded, replacing COPWE, Serto Ader became the central organ of the new party.
