= Tewodros Bekele =

Ethiopian trade unionist

- Died: 25 February, 1977
- Cause of death: Assassination
- Citizenship: Ethiopia
- Occupation: trade unionist

Tewodros Bekele (died February 25, 1977) was an Ethiopian trade unionist. Tewodros was a leader of the Seamen's Union. He was a leading member of the All-Ethiopian Socialist Movement (MEISON). In early 1977 he became the founding chairman of the All-Ethiopia Trade Union (AETU).

In broad daylight, gunmen entered the headquarters of the AETU in Addis Ababa on February 25, 1977. Tewodros was killed in the attack, and his deputy Getachew Legasse was seriously wounded. The assassination of Tewodros Bekele was publicly ascribed to the Ethiopian People's Revolutionary Party, although suspicion has also been directed to the Derg.

His assassination was among the earliest high-profile killings of a trade union leader during the political violence of 1977 in Ethiopia.
