= Common Front of Ethiopian Marxist–Leninist Organizations =

1977–1979 communist coalition in Ethiopia

Common Front of Ethiopian Marxist–Leninist Organizations የኢትዮጵያ ማርክሲስት ሌኒኒስት ድርጅቶች ኅብረት
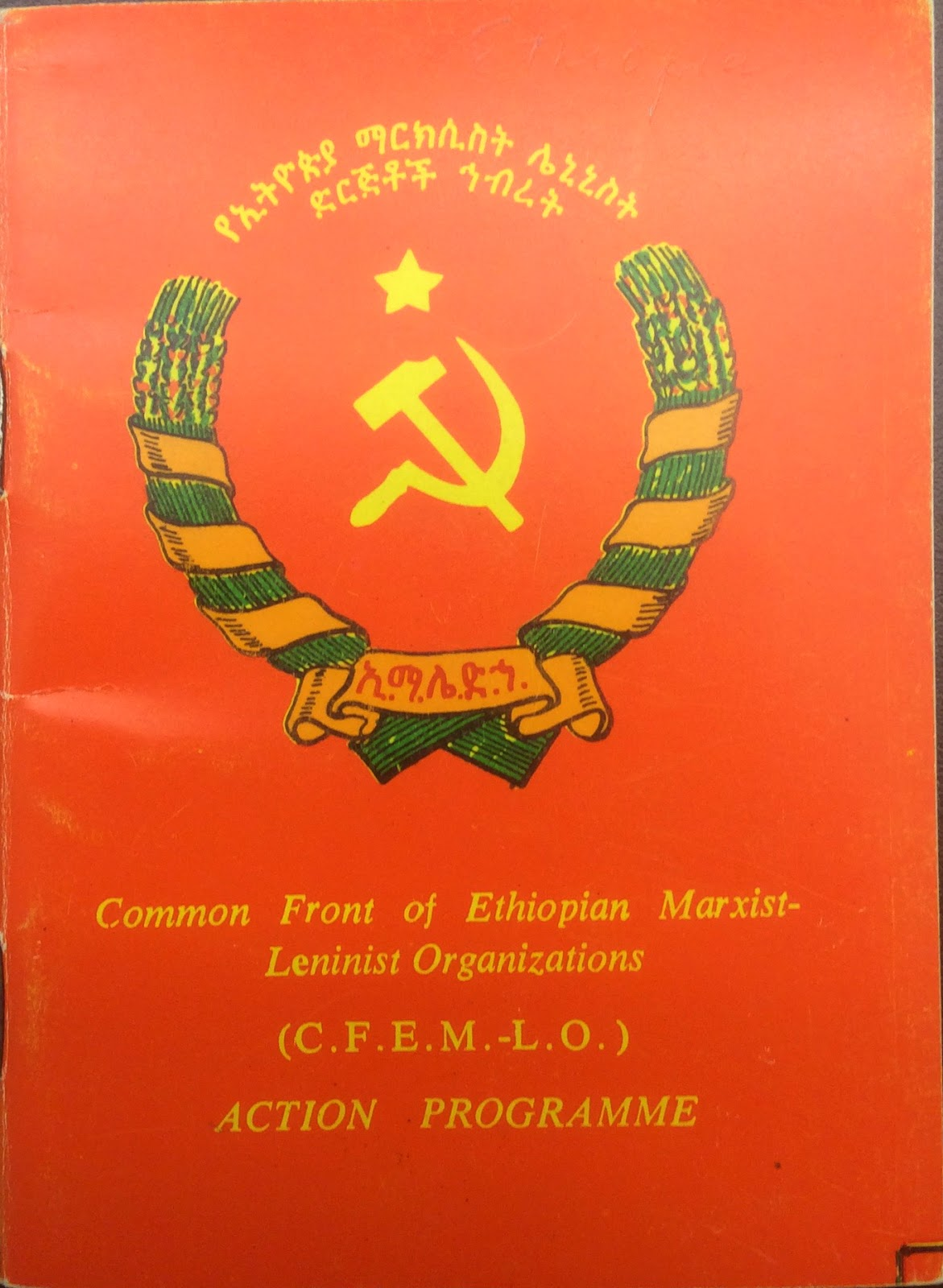
- Founded: 26 February 1977
- Dissolved: February 1979
- Merger of: MEISON; Echat; MALERID; Waz League; Abyotawit Seded
- Merged into: Commission for Organizing the Party of the Working People of Ethiopia
- Ideology: Communism; Marxism–Leninism

The Common Front of Ethiopian Marxist–Leninist Organizations (Amharic: የኢትዮጵያ ማርክሲስት ሌኒኒስት ድርጅቶች ኅብረት), known by its Amharic acronym Imaledih or Emaledh (Amharic: ኢማሌድኅ), was a coalition of communist organizations in Ethiopia active between 1977 and 1979. Imaledih was intended as a pre-party formation, Imaledih was supposed function as the nucleus of new proletarian party. Through Imaledih, the constituent parties of the coalition would merge. The formation of Imaledih was actively supported by the ruling Derg military junta.

== History ==
Imaledih was founded on February 26, 1977, by five organizations: All-Ethiopia Socialist Movement (MEISON), Ethiopian Oppressed People's Revolutionary Struggle (Ichat), Ethiopian Marxist–Leninist Revolutionary Organization (Malerid), Waz League and Revolutionary Flame (Seded). These were the same organizations that had formed the Provisional Office for Mass Organizational Affairs (POMOA). However, whereas POMOA had functioned as a government department Imaledih was (in theory) a voluntary association. Imaledih published YeHebret demtse (Amharic: የኅብረት ድምፅ, 'Voice of Unity') as its organ.

The goal of Imaledih was to mobilize support for the National Democratic Revolution Programme and to build a new party. The Imaledih programme called for the construction of a people's army, politicizing the population, increasing party membership, raising the political level of party cadres and integration of oppressed nationalities in government and party structures. The formation of Imaledih followed the breakout of the Ogaden War. The Imaledih factions requested to be able to provide political education to the armed forces, but President Mengistu Haile Mariam refused to go along with this plan.

Imaledih soon fell apart. MEISON broke with the Derg and withdrew from the alliance in August 1977. The dismissal of MEISON from Imaledih was declared in Yehebret demtse in the same month. Ichat was expelled from Imaledih in March 1978, for supposed differences over political and ideological line.

In the views of the Derg, the Imaledih project was a failure. The Derg began seeking other ways to form a vanguard party. However, even as of September 1978 President Mengistu still maintained the position that the new party would emerge from Imaledih. In his Revolution Day speech he argued that 'the foremost slogan of the day is "Let the Common Front of Ethiopian Marxist-Leninist Organizations evolve into merger!"' Mengistu's position on Imaledih changed soon thereafter, as claims were made that Waz League had infiltrated Seded and come to occupy leading posts in Seded.

The member organizations of Imaledih were crushed by the Derg. MEISON was banned. The smaller civilian factions (Malerid, Ichat and Waz League) were suppressed. Even Seded, Mengistu's own group, was disbanded. Imaledih was dissolved in February 1979. In connection with the dissolution, Yehebret demtse declared that a new party would be formed, but not through a merger of organizations. Imaledih was substituted by a new structure, the Commission for Organizing the Party of the Working People of Ethiopia (COPWE).

Out of the party members attending the 1984 congress of the Workers' Party of Ethiopia, 1,437 (71.29%) had belonged to Imaledih.
