= Baro Tumsa =

Ethiopian Oromo nationalist (1938–1978)

- Baaroo Tumsaa
- Born: Baro Tumsa; 1938; Bodji, Wallega, Oromia
- Died: 1978 (aged 39–40); Harerge, Oromia
- Organization(s): Echat; Oromo Liberation Front
- Known for: Student movement leader; Introducing the "Land to the Tiller" slogan; Main architect of the founding of the Oromo Liberation Front (OLF); and Visionary and transformative leadership.
- Relatives: Gudina Tumsa (brother) Nagasaa Tumsa (brother) Rahel Tumsa (sister)

Baro Tumsa (1938–1978) was an Oromo pharmacist, lawyer and Oromo nationalist and political activist, who was instrumental for the creation of the Oromo Liberation Front (OLF). [Baro Tumsa: The Principal Architect of the Oromo Liberation Front (book by Asafa Jalata) Palgrave Macmillan Publication, 2024].

== Early life ==
Baro Tumsa was born in 1938 in Bodji Karkaro, Wallaga, Oromia. His father, Tumsa Silga, and his mother, Nasise Chiracho, died while he was very young and so he was raised by his elder brother, Gudina Tumsa. He had one sister, Rahel, and two brothers, Gudina and Nagassa.

== Education and political activism ==
=== Education ===
Tumsa completed primary education and part of his secondary education in the town of Nekemte, Wallaga, and later in Bishoftu, East Shewa. Subsequently, he joined the then Haile Selassie I University in Addis Ababa (Finfinne) and graduated with BSc in Pharmacy, in 1966.

Tumsa was mentored and encouraged to study Law by the likes of Dhinsa Lepisa, and Baqala Nadhi (both lawyers) from the Macha and Tulama Self-help Association and, he re-joined Haile Selassie I University Law School, where he completed his legal education. His LLM thesis entitled "Decentralisation and Nation Building" remains a seminal piece on the issue of national question in the Ethiopian Empire. (now Addis Ababa University).

=== Political activism ===
==== Membership of the MTA ====
The Macha and Tulama Self-Help Association (an organisation which was banned in 1966, and some of its leaders were jailed or killed) attracted Oromo students from Haile Selassie I University, including Tumsa (the Chairman of the University Students' Union), Lieutenant Mamo Mazamir, Ibsa Gutama, Mekonnen Gallan, Taha Ali Abdi, and many others. With the exception of Mamo Mazamir, who was martyred in 1969, the rest were founding members of the Oromo Liberation Front in 1974. Besides Tumsa, Mazamir was among the university students who contributed to the radicalization of the Association. This establishes a direct link between the transition from the Macha and Tulama Association to the OLF (Hassen 1996: 75).

==== Leader of Student Movement ====
Tumsa, as the Chairman of Ethiopian Student Union, and his fellow Oromo, the President of the Parliament secretly arranged for the staging of the first ever 'Land to the Tiller' demonstration against the Haile Selassie regime. Tumsa, cognisant of the fact that the Oromo were usurped from their ancestral land by the colonial settlers, is credited for the coining of the slogan 'Land to the Tiller'. The university students not only energized the movement but also raised the famous slogan of 'Land to the Tiller' which became the binding revolutionary slogan for the Ethiopian student movements both at home and abroad. From that day until the unseating of the imperial government, this slogan was never missing from the almost annual event of student anti-government demonstrations (Lata 1999: 191-192). Today, after nearly a half-century, the new generation of Oromo students are rallying under the slogan 'the matter of land is the matter of life' in their resistance against farm-land grabbing.

==== Organizer ====
Tumsa viewed the Oromo cause as a colonial issue and organized the Oromo into a distinct political force. He worked to connect Oromo individuals from various regions and backgrounds. Within the Addis Ababa-based underground movement, Tumsa and Rev. Gudina Tumsa coordinated ongoing resistance activities .

==== Ideologue and Founder of the Oromo Liberation Front ====
Tumsa was instrumental in the formation of the Oromo Liberation Front. It was he who organized a secret conference in Addis Ababa in December 1973. Among the participants, Hussein Sura (Sheik Hussen), the leader of Beirut-based organization, Elemo Qilixxu, the leader of Aden-based Oromo National Liberation, and Baker Yusuf, came from the Middle East. Several individuals from different regions of Oromia also participated in that conference, out of which the OLF was formed in early 1974. According to Olana Zoga, the author of History of Macha and Tulama Association, under the leadership of Tumsa, underground members of the Association which gave rise to the OLF took advantage of the February 1974 Revolution and contributed to the overthrow of Haile Sellassie's regime in four ways:

First, its members effectively used the limited freedom of the press, which flourished in Ethiopia from March to June 1974 for the purpose of exposing Oromo colonial experience.

Second, its parliamentary members regularly challenged many of the regime's policies.

Third, its members conducted agitation among the university and high school students.

Fourth and most important, the underground members of the military police forces were instrumental in organizing the committee of the men in uniform (Derg or Dergue in Amharic) that overthrew the Emperor in September 1974 Zoga 1993: 301- 302).

From this aspect it is very clear that the OLF grew out of the underground Macha and Tulama Association, and it is firmly rooted in Oromo national consciousness and it bases its ideological fire on Oromo nationalism. Consequently, it can be said that the emergence of a national movement indicates that a population or social group has reached a new stage on the road to nationhood: the transition to political action. The nation, or the sections of a population that consider themselves to be a nation, attempt to create their own state (Alter 1989: 22-23).

==== Freedom Fighter in the Mountains of Gara Mulata ====
Tumsa left behind the comfort of his privileged life in Finfinne to join the nascent guerrilla force of the OLF in the eastern command in 1978 and sacrificed his life for the freedom of the Oromo nation. By then he was married and a father of three children. He comes from an unprivileged background and established himself as a member of the urban elite educated and well connected middle class. However, he swapped these luxuries for the hardships in the mountains of Oromia for the sake of the freedom of his people whom he loved with all his heart and mind. The circumstances of his death remains unclear to this day.

== See also ==
- Land to the Tiller (Ethiopia)
