= Asrat Desta =

Ethiopian soldier and politician (died 1977)

Asrat

Lieutenant Colonel Asrat Desta (Amharic: ኮሎኔል አሥራት ደስታ, died 3 February 1977) was an Ethiopian soldier and politician who was the Chairman of Information and Public Relation Committee of the PMAC of Ethiopia. He died on 3 February 1977, together with Head of State Brigadier General Tafari Benti and five other officers in a coup d'état carried out against them by Colonel Mengistu Haile Mariam.

== Early life ==
Asrat was born to a family of three in Bulga in the province of Shoa, Ethiopia presently Amhara region approximately 70 kilometers north of Addis Ababa (capital city of Ethiopia). As his father was a governor of the district, according to the old Ethiopian tradition, a private tutor was employed for him at an early age. He started receiving proper instruction and guidance in learning how to read and write Ge'ez (an ancient Ethiopic language) and Amharic, religion and moral. Also, he participated in some of traditional sports, such as: gena and horseback riding. Gena is a hockey-like game among youngsters in the country side.

He lost his father at an early age. His mother became determined to educate him, since he was the only son in the family. She sent him to a traditional boarding school for the first time. Continuing his schooling, he went to government schools in two places: first in Addis Abeba and then to a provincial town called Asella and again in Addis Ababa. After completing his elementary and secondary education in these two places, he decided to join the army as a cadet. In September 1956, he went to the H.S.I. (Haile Selassie the 1st) Holeta Military Training Center (44 kilometers), west of Addis Abeba, from which he graduated as a second lieutenant in June 1957.

== Military career ==
Upon his graduation from the cadet school he was assigned to the H.S.I. (Haile Selassie the 1st) Military Academy (Harar, eastern Ethiopia), as one of the first instructors. However, in November of the same year he was sent to Fort Benning, Georgia, to attend the basics Infantry Officer’s course and then to Fort Knox, Kentucky, for Armor Motor Officer’s Course. These were his first experiences travelling abroad.

Upon his return home, he continued to be an instructor at the Academy where he served for five years. In addition to his instructorship assignment he also served as a cadet platoon and company commander and also as Multimodal transport operator (MTO). In his capacity as an MTO he has had the opportunity and privilege of being Chief-instructor for Driving and Maintenance instructions of the cadets.

Asrat was later assigned to the 3rd Ethiopian Tekel Brigade in the Republic of Congo, in September 1962. He acted as a Training and Operations Officer and as a senior instructor for the 3rd Eth-Armored Unimog Squadron. He was also a troop leader of the same squadron, thereby carrying the double responsibility of training and command as an acting Captain in Rank. After his return from the Congo, he was posted at the Ground Forces Headquarters in the Personnel Division in Addis Abeba. It was this assignment that gave him an opportunity to go to college.

From September 1963 to July 1964 he went to the University College of Addis Ababa, H.S.I. (Haile Selassie the 1st University) as a Liberal Arts student. Toward the end of 1964 when he won a scholarship award from Linfield College, in Oregon, USA.

During his juniors year Asrat was on the college president’s honor list. In 1968, after graduating from Linfield College with a B.A. degree in Sociology and Political Science, as a double major, he returned to his country and became an assistant Armed Forces Information Officer in the Chief of Staff’s Office at the Defense Headquarters in Addis Abeba. He subsequently became head of that department, a post which he held for the one and half years, until the time he came to Fort Benning. In those four years his experiences has increased in dimension as the result of the opportunity of traveling all over the major African countries, south European countries, Middle East cities, and also Delhi and Karachi on official business.

== Member of the Derg ==
Asrat was a member of the Derg, the military junta that ruled Ethiopia during the Ethiopian Revolution. Following the Derg's assumption of power over Ethiopia in 1974, Lt. Colonel Asrat, who was a Major at the time, became the chairman of the Derg's information and public affairs committee.

Asrat was a member of the faction opposed to Lieutenant Colonel Mengistu Haile Mariam. At a February 3, 1977 meeting between Mengistu and his opponents, who included not only Lt. Colonel Asrat but chairman General Tafari Benti and a number of leading members of the Derg, gunfire erupted leaving both Asrat and Tafari, as well as six other leaders of the Derg dead. Mengistu afterwards broadcast on Radio Ethiopia that Lt. Colonel Asrat and his dead compatriots had attempted a "fascist coup d'etat in the capital identical to what had taken place in Chile", and labeling them "fifth columnists" of the Ethiopian Democratic Union and Ethiopian People's Revolutionary Party rebel groups.
