= Berhane Meskel Reda =

Ethiopian student leader and revolutionary (c. 1943–1979)

- ብርሃነ ምስቀል ረዳ
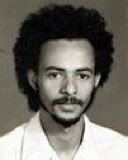
- Picture of Berhane Meskel Reda
- Born: c. 1943; Adwa, Tigray Province, Ethiopian Empire
- Died: July 12, 1979; Addis Ababa, Ethiopia (presumed)
- Cause of death: Gunshot wounds
- Other names: Berhané-Meskel Redda; Birhanemeskel Reda
- Occupations: Student leader; revolutionary; political organizer
- Organization: Ethiopian People's Revolutionary Party (EPRP)
- Known for: Co-founding and serving as first Secretary-General of the EPRP (1972)
- Spouse: Tadelech Hailemikael

Berhane Meskel Reda (Tigrinya: ብርሃነ ምስቀል ረዳ, romanized: Bərhane Məsqäl Räda); also spelled Berhané-Meskel Redda or Birhanemeskel Reda; died 12 July 1979) was an Ethiopian student leader and revolutionary, best known as a founding figure and the first secretary-general of the Ethiopian People's Revolutionary Party (EPRP), originally established as the Ethiopian People's Liberation Organization (EPLO) in 1972. A prominent activist from the Ethiopian student movement, he was arrested during the period of political repression known as the Red Terror and executed by the military government on 12 July 1979.

== Early life and student activism ==
Berhane Meskel Reda was born around September 1943 near Adwa, in the then Tigray Province of the Ethiopian Empire. He received his schooling in Dessie before enrolling at the University College of Addis Ababa.

While studying at the University College of Addis Ababa, he became active in the Ethiopian Student Movement, born in a period marked by radical debates on land reform, socialism, and national questions. In 1963–1964, he served as Press and Information Officer of the University College Union and as Secretary-General of the National Union of Ethiopian University Students. Bahru Zewde describes him as particularly noted for his oratory and organizational skills. There,

However, his activities were not confined to politics. He appeared in the play Comedy of Love, first staged at the University College in 1962 and later performed at secondary schools, and served as the first editor of the Amharic literary magazine Endih Näw, the counterpart of the English-language student magazine Something. In 1964, Berhane and a group of like-minded students founded the "Crocodile Society", which Zewde identifies as an early nucleus of the Marxist-Leninist current that subsequently expanded within the Ethiopian student movement. During the major student demonstration of 1965, Berhane participated in protests under the slogan "Land to the Tiller!"; he and eight other activists were subsequently expelled from the University for one year.

Within them, Berhane emerged as one of the prominent figures linking campus activism with clandestine political organization. Historians emphasize that his background in both provincial Ethiopia and the capital gave him an ability to mediate between grassroots concerns and the ideological debates of the student left.

== Role in the EPLO/EPRP ==
EPLO (soon renamed EPRP) was founded by exiled Ethiopian students in April 1972 in West Berlin. At this first congress, a central committee and politburo were elected, with Berhane Meskel Reda chosen as the organization's first secretary-general. Subsequent scholarship on Ethiopian political elites describes the 1972 founding as occurring largely through Berhane's efforts, as the student movement's organizational center of gravity shifted from unions to party structures.

== Internal debates and split ==
During 1974–1977, strategic disagreements intensified within the EPRP over urban guerrilla warfare versus other forms of struggle. Academic readings of contemporaneous memoirs note that Berhane, together with fellow central committee member Getachew Maru, opposed the escalation of urban armed actions, a stance that contributed to factional conflicts inside the party. Studies of insurgent politics in northern Ethiopia also place Berhane at inter-organizational talks in early 1975, reflecting his prominence in the EPRP's leadership at the time.

== Arrest and execution ==
In the context of the Derg's Red Terror (1976–1978), which targeted rival leftist groups and perceived opponents, Berhane was detained and later executed. Multiple sources record his execution on 12 July 1979. Academic literature on the Red Terror discusses the prosecution of EPRP leaders during this period and identifies Berhane among prominent figures eliminated by the regime's security apparatus.

== Legacy ==
Histories of the Ethiopian student movement and of the revolutionary decade frequently reference Berhane's role in the transition from student activism to party politics and in early debates about strategy on the revolutionary left. Scholarly works on the Red Terror and civil war era often treat his career as emblematic of the generational arc from campus radicalism to clandestine organization and repression.

Memoir literature and literary-journal excerpts identify Tadelech Hailemikael as Berhane's spouse; she later published a prison memoir recounting her activities with the EPRP and the impact of her husband's death.

== See also ==
- Ethiopian People's Revolutionary Party
- Red Terror (Ethiopia)
- Ethiopian Student Movement
