= List of events during the Silver Jubilee of Elizabeth II =

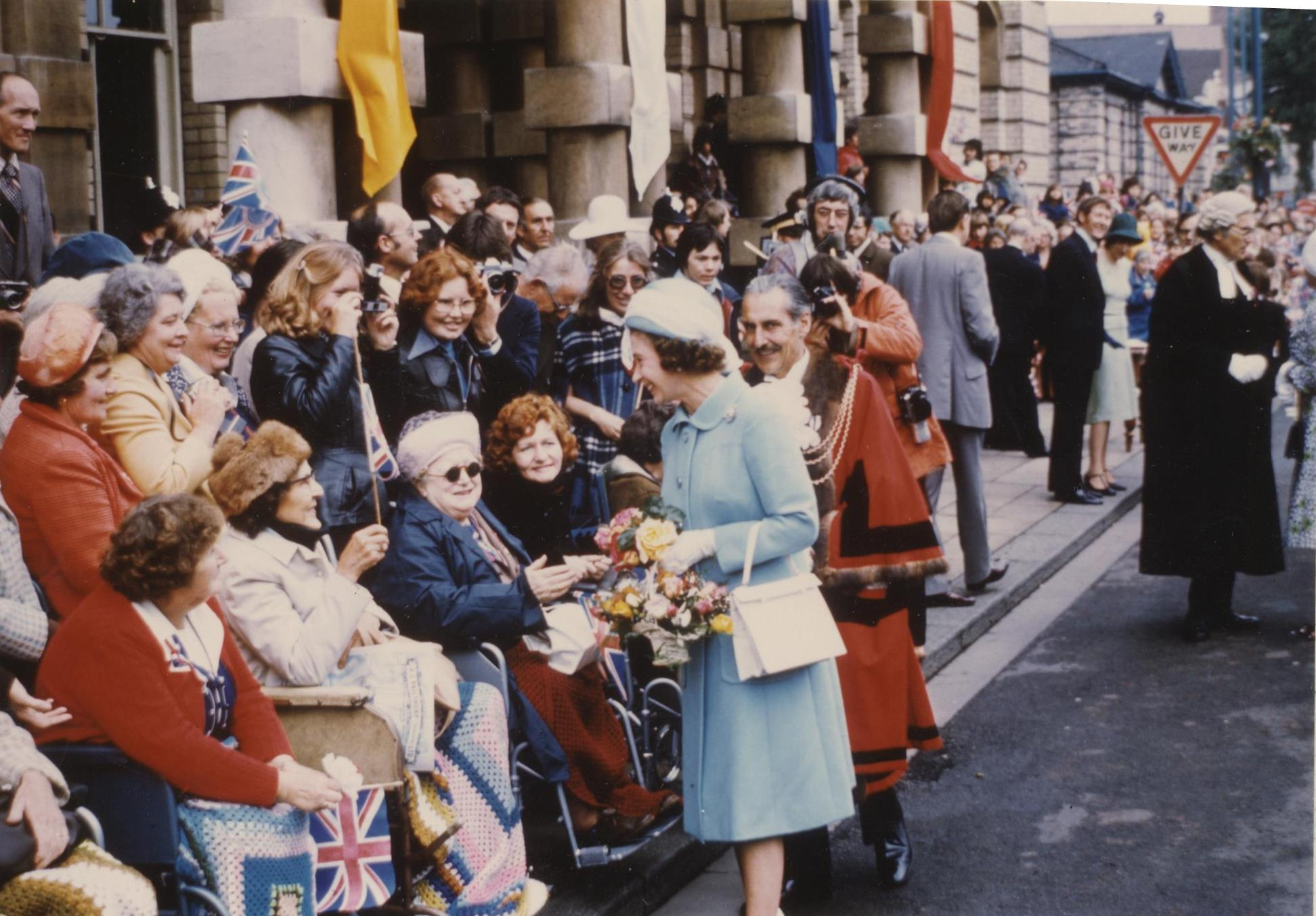
Elizabeth II speaking to disabled women during her visit to Grimsby in July 1977. The Queen is pictured here with the town's mayor.

The Silver Jubilee of Queen Elizabeth II marked the 25th anniversary of Queen Elizabeth II's accession to the thrones of the United Kingdom and other Commonwealth realms. (Note: At the time, the realms were Australia, the Bahamas, Barbados, Canada, Fiji, Grenada, Jamaica, Mauritius, New Zealand, Papua New Guinea, and the United Kingdom. Three of these countries - Barbados, Fiji and Mauritius - have since become republics, but a further seven countries have become Commonwealth realms since 1977.) It was celebrated with large-scale parties and parades throughout the United Kingdom and the Commonwealth throughout 1977, culminating in June with the official "Jubilee Days", held to coincide with the Queen's Official Birthday. The anniversary date itself was commemorated in church services across the land on 6 February 1977, and continued throughout the month. In March, preparations started for large parties in every major city of the United Kingdom, as well as for smaller ones for countless individual streets throughout the country.

The Queen had the following engagements during her Silver Jubilee:

== February ==
- 10 February – State visit to American Samoa
- 11 February – Royal Visit to Western Samoa
- 14 February – Royal Visit to Tonga
- 16–17 February – Royal Visit to Fiji
- 22 February – 7 March – Royal Visit to New Zealand including
  - 26 February – Visit to the Maori Festival at Gisborne
  - 28 February – State Opening of Parliament, Wellington

== March ==
- 1 March – Visit to Queen Carnival 2 March. Visit Mosgiel (NZ) and Royal NZ Aero Club Air Show.
- 7–30 March – Royal Visit to Australia, including
  - 8 March – State Opening of Parliament, Canberra
- 11 March – Royal Visit to Launceston, Tasmania and Newcastle, New South Wales
- 14 March – Royal Visit to Sydney
- 21 March – Royal Visit to Nuriootpa, South Australia
- 30 March – Royal Visit to Perth
- 23–25 March – Royal Visit to Papua New Guinea
- 30 March – Royal Visit to Bombay
- 31 March – Royal Visit to Muscat, Oman

== April ==
- 11 April – Launch of London Transport's Silver Jubilee buses.

== May ==
- 3 May – Launch of HMS Invincible by Queen Elizabeth II at Barrow-in-Furness
- 4 May – The Queen receives addresses from the House of Commons and the House of Lords
- 6 May – Royal Review of the Police, Hendon
- 7 May – Royal Review of Rolls-Royces, Windsor Castle
- 10 May – Royal reception for delegates to the NATO Ministerial Council Meeting
- 11 May – Issue of the British Silver Jubilee stamps
- 13 May – Biggin Hill Air Fair
- 14–15 May – Historic Aircraft Display, White Waltham
- 15 May – The Queen receives the horse "Centennial" from the Commissioner of the Royal Canadian Mounted Police
- 16 May – Royal Visit to the Royal Horticultural Society's Chelsea Show
- 17 May – Royal Visit to Glasgow (including football match, the Glasgow FA Select v the Football League XI, Hampden Park)
- 18 May – Royal Visit to Cumbernauld and Stirling
- 19 May – Royal Visit to Perth and Dundee
- 20 May – Royal Visit to Aberdeen
- 23 May – Royal Visit to Edinburgh
- 27 May – British Genius Exhibition, Battersea Park (until 30 October)
- 28 May – Royal Visit to Windsor
- 30 May – The Queen attends gala performance of opera and ballet, Royal Opera House, Covent Garden

== June ==
- 3 June – Trooping of the Colour, London, Ontario
- 6 June – Lighting of bonfire chain, Windsor
- 7 June – Silver Jubilee Bank Holiday
- 8 June – Commonwealth Heads of Government Meeting 1977, Lancaster House
- 9 June – Royal Visit to Greenwich and River Progress
- 11 June – Trooping of the Colour, Horse Guards Parade
- 12 June – Royal salute at march past of Royal British Legion Standards
- 13 June – Garter Service, Windsor Castle
- 16 June – Silver Jubilee Test match, Lord's Cricket Ground (Australia v England)
- 20 June – Royal Visit to Lancaster, Preston, Leigh, Stretford, and Manchester
- 21 June – Royal Visit to St. Helens, Liverpool and Bootle Stockport
- 22 June – Royal Visit to Harlech Castle, Blaenau Ffestiniog, Llandudno, Conwy, Bangor and Holyhead
- 23 June – Royal Visit to Milford Haven, Haverfordwest, Carmarthen, Llanelli, Swansea, Neath and Barry
- 24 June – Royal Visit to Cardiff and Risca
- 28 June – Royal Review of the Royal Navy, Spithead
- 29 June – Royal Visit to Portsmouth
- 30 June – Royal Visit to South London and Royal Review of Reserve & Cadet Forces Wembley Stadium

== July ==
- 1 July – Royal Visit to Wimbledon
- 4 July – Guildford Silver Jubilee Pageant (attended by Princess Anne on 6 July) (until 16 July)
- 6 July – Royal Visit to North London
- 7 July – Royal Review of the British Army of the Rhine, Germany
- 10 July – Silver Jubilee Powerboat Race, from HMS Belfast to Calais
- 11 July – Royal Visit to Norwich, Ipswich and Felixstowe
- 12 July – Royal Visit to Grimsby, Doncaster, Sheffield, Barnsley and Leeds
- 13 July – Royal Visit to Wakefield, Harrogate, Beverley, York and Hull
- 14 July – Royal Visit to Middlesbrough, Hartlepool (including naming of RNLB The Scout), Eston and Durham
- 15 July – Royal Visit to Newcastle-upon-Tyne and Sunderland
- 19 July – Royal Visit to Royal Tournament, Earl's Court
- 27 July – Royal Visit to Wolverhampton, Dudley, West Bromwich, Walsall, Birmingham, Hampton-in-Arden, Solihull and Coventry
- 28 July – Royal Visit to Leicester, Chesterfield, Mansfield, Derby and Nottingham
- 29 July – Royal Review of the Royal Air Force, RAF Finningley

== August ==
- 3 August – Colchester Searchlight Tattoo
- 4 August – Cardiff Silver Jubilee Tattoo
- 4 August – Royal Visit to Southampton
- 5 August – Royal Visit to Torbay, Exeter and Plymouth (including Royal Review of the Royal Marines)
- 6 August – Royal Visit to Falmouth, Truro, Bodmin and St. Austell
- 7 August – Royal Visit to Lundy (a private visit as "time off" from the official tour)
- 8 August – Royal Visit to Bristol, Northavon, Bath, Keynsham and Weston-super-Mare
- 10 August – Royal Visit to Belfast
- 11 August – Royal Visit to Derry
- 13 August – Open Day, RAF Lossiemouth
- 18 August – Edinburgh Military Tattoo, Edinburgh Castle
- 20 August – Greenwich Jubilee Clipper Week Regetta
- 27–29 August – Plymouth Navy Days

== September ==
- 10 September – Lions v Barbarians Rugby Match, Twickenham
- 15–17 September – Ryder Cup, Royal Lytham & St Annes Golf Club

== October ==
- 14–19 October – Royal Visit to Canada including
  - 18 October – State Opening of Parliament, Ottawa
- 19–20 October – Royal Visit to the Bahamas
- 20 October – Royal Visit to the British Virgin Islands
- 28 October – Royal Visit to Antigua and Barbuda
- 30 October – Royal Visit to Mustique
- 31 October – Royal Visit to Barbados

== November ==
- 22 November – Leeds United v Ajax football match, Leeds
- 28 November – Hong Kong Silver Jubilee Pageant

== December ==
- 16 December – Royal opening of Piccadilly line extension to Heathrow Central
- 25 December – Royal Christmas Message is broadcast to the Commonwealth
