= Addis Admass =

Ethiopian Amharic-language newspaper

- Language: Amharic
- Headquarters: Addis Ababa
- Website: www.addisadmassnews.com

Addis Admass is a private Amharic Language newspaper, which is published in Ethiopia.
