= Echat =

1975–1978 communist organization in Ethiopia

Echat Ethiopian Oppressed People's Revolutionary Struggle
- Leader: Baro Tumsa
- General Secretary: Tesfaye Habis
- Founded: 1975
- Dissolved: 1978
- Split from: MEISON
- Ideology: Communism; Pan-Ethiopianism
- National affiliation: Imaledih

Echat (Amharic: ኢጭአት, acronym for የኢትዮጵያ ጭቁኖች አብዮታዊ ትግል, 'Ethiopian Oppressed People's Revolutionary Struggle') was a communist organization in Ethiopia. The organization was active between 1975 and 1978. The organization emerged from a split away from the All-Ethiopian Socialist Movement (MEISON). Echat was initially allied with the Derg military junta, but later turned against it.

== Structure and background ==
Echat was led by Baro Tumsa. Tesfaye Habiso was the secretary of Echat.

The organization consisted of groups representing different oppressed nationalities. Echat portrayed itself as a pan-Ethiopian movement. Its membership was largely Oromo, it found its following amongst urban Oromo population.

As of 1976 Echat held two of the 15 seats in the 'Politburo' of the Provisional Office for Mass Organizational Affairs (POMOA). On February 26, 1977 Echat, Meison and three other organizations founded the Union of Ethiopian Marxist-Leninist Organizations.

Echat took a critical stand towards the 'Red Terror' campaign of Mengistu. It had also opposed the banning of Meison. The regime on its behalf perceived Echat as a hotbed of Southern ethnic nationalism. Mengistu accused Echat of creating divisions between ethnic groups. Mengistu claimed that some Echat members had cooperated with Somalia against Ethiopian interests. Echat was also accused of siding with Meison, of having links with the Oromo Liberation Front and of promoting narrow nationalism. Baro Tumsa and other key Echat leaders went underground in late 1977. During this period leading members of Echat were hunted down and jailed. Echat was expelled from the Union of Ethiopian Marxist-Leninist Organizations in March 1978, for supposed differences over political and ideological line. The Derg crushed Echat, along with the other factions of the Union of Ethiopian Marxist-Leninist Organizations.

After breaking with the Derg, many of the Echat cadres joined the Oromo Liberation Front.
