= Abyotawit Seded =

1976–1979 communist political party in Ethiopia

Revolutionary Flame አብዮታዊ ሰደድ
- Founder: Mengistu Haile Mariam
- Founded: August 1976
- Dissolved: 1979
- Succeeded by: Imaledih
- Ideology: Communism; Marxism–Leninism

Abyotawit Seded (Amharic: አብዮታዊ ሰደድ, 'Revolutionary Flame', 'Seded' for short) was a communist organization in Ethiopia, formed in 1976 by a group of officers of the Derg military junta who had attended political trainings in the Soviet Union from 1975 and onwards.

== History ==
Seded was set up in August 1976 by Mengistu Haile Mariam and 15 other Derg members. Mengistu was the titular chairman of Seded. The key organizer of the group was, however, Legasse Asfew (a former sergeant). The political programme of the group was elaborated at the time of its founding. Through the launching of Seded, Mengistu hoped to be able to challenge the influence of the All-Ethiopian Socialist Movement (MEISON) in the urban dwellers' associations (kebeles).

Seded was a clandestine group, known by the name of its publication. The existence of Seded was never publicly acknowledged.

Regarding the national question Seded recognized the right to national self-determination in principle, but saw practical constraints for its implementation.

The Derg was suspicious of MEISON influence in different sectors (such as education), and Seded sought to displace MEISON as the chief political adviser to Derg. Seded would function as the key instrument of the Derg to gain control over the Provisional Office for Mass Organizational Affairs (POMOA). However, the admission of Seded into POMOA caused dissent in the coalition. MEISON and Ichat saw the entry of Seded as a threat to their own control over the structure. Malerid and Waz League, on the other hand, supported the entry of Seded as a counterweight to MEISON and Ichat. Seded obtained 4 of the 15 seats in the POMOA Central Committee.

By 1977, thousands of Ethiopian military personnel had passed through training courses in the Soviet Union, East Germany, Bulgaria, Cuba, Czechoslovakia, and Yugoslavia. The graduates of these courses formed the bulks of the followers of Seded. But Seded also won support amongst high-level civil servants, who either felt threatened by the influence of MEISON, supported the intervention of the army into politics or had links to Derg officials.

On February 26, 1977 Seded, MEISON and three other organizations (Ichat, Malerid and Waz League) founded the Union of Ethiopian Marxist-Leninist Organizations. These were the same organizations that were members of POMOA.

After the split between MEISON and the Derg in August 1977 a series of MEISON leaders were assassinated. Seded members were suspected of being behind these killings. Seded cadres were placed in the leadership of institutions such as the Yekatit '66 Political School, which had been under the control of MEISON. But whereas the top leaders of MEISON were killed, many second-rank cadres of MEISON joined Seded and obtained prominent government positions.

After the elimination of MEISON and Ichat, Seded was the largest political organization in the pro-Derg coalition. A Seded cadre, Lt. Desta Tadesse, was named as the general secretary of POMOA.

In the second half of 1978, suspicions were raised that the Waz League had infiltrated Seded and come to occupy leading posts in Seded, leading to a break with the Waz League as well. It was, however, unlikely that the Waz League would have been able to penetrate the inner circle of military leaders of Seded. In 1979, Seded was legally disbanded.
