= All-Ethiopia Socialist Movement =

Political party in Ethiopia

All-Ethiopia Socialist Movement መላ ኢትዮጵያ ሶሻሊስት ንቅናቄ Mela Ītyōṗṗyā Soshalīsit Nik'inak'ē
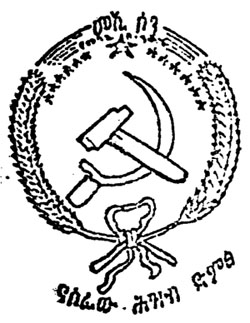
- Abbreviation: MEISON
- Founded: 1968
- Ideology: Communism; Marxism–Leninism
- Political position: Far-left
- National affiliation: Imaledih (late 1970s); COEDF (former)

Website
- meison.info

The All-Ethiopia Socialist Movement (Amharic: መላ ኢትዮጵያ ሶሻሊስት ንቅናቄ, romanized: Mela Ītyōṗṗyā Soshalīsit Nik'inak'ē, native acronym: MEISON, Amharic: መኢሶን) is a political party in Ethiopia. A Marxist–Leninist organization, MEISON played an active role in Ethiopian politics during the 1970s. Both it and the Ethiopian People's Revolutionary Party (EPRP) were enthusiastic supporters of the revolution that toppled Emperor Haile Selassie. However, as Mengistu Haile Mariam rose to power as leader of the ruling Derg government, conflict began to develop between the two groups. MEISON initially aligned itself with the Derg, but fell out with Mengistu as the Red Terror progressed and was repressed from mid-1977 onwards.

== History ==
MEISON was formed as a clandestine organization during the 8th ESUE (Ethiopian Student Union in Europe) congress in August 1968 by some of the most senior of the exiled radical Ethiopian students. Prominent founders include: Worku Ferede (elected chairman at meeting), Kebede Mengesha, Negede Gobeze, Andargachew Assegid, Fikre Merid, Hagos Gebreyesus, and Haile Fida. Other early prominent members included Andreas Eshete, Haile Menkerios, Alem Habtu, and Dessalegn Rahmato.

Limited free expression was permitted following the 1974 revolution that installed the Derg as the state's authority, and politics became dominated by members of the radical Left who had previously opposed Haile Selassie at home and abroad. MEISON and the EPRP quickly grew to be the two dominant Marxist parties, and their leadership & members across Europe, North America, and the Middle East quickly returned home to take part in the revolution.

Ideological friction between EPRP and MEISON, for years played out in the arena of exile student politics, would never come close to improving at home, with deadly consequences for all. The EPRP opposed the Derg, claiming it was standing in the way of a genuine "people's democracy" and later accusing Mengistu of fascism. MEISON, on the other hand, was willing to allow the Derg authority in restructuring Ethiopian society along Marxist-Leninist principles, at least for the time being, and favored a more "controlled democracy." Because of this, MEISON won the Derg's favor, and gained key posts in the new government.

== Conflict with EPRP and the Red Terror ==
Ideological differences eventually erupted into violent conflict that peaked in 1976, with clashes between EPRP and MEISON supporters and EPRP attacks against public buildings and high-ranking Derg officials. In response to this instability, Mengistu implemented a program of Red Terror designed to eliminate all EPRP opposition.

During the first stages of the Red Terror, MEISON remained closely allied with the Derg and assisted in combatting suspected EPRP supporters. In February 1977 MEISON joined the Union of Ethiopian Marxist–Leninist Organizations (Imaledih). But later in 1977, the Derg turned on MEISON, fearing its membership was more loyal to the party than it was to the Derg. In August 1977, most of MEISON's domestic leadership including its chairman Haile Fida, quickly went underground and Haile attempted to flee Addis Ababa to his home province of Welega, but all were arrested and later executed. All other high-ranking MEISON members were removed from their government posts, and the Derg soon launched a bloody campaign against rural MEISON supporters.
