= Ethiopian People's Revolutionary Party =

Political party in Ethiopia

Ethiopian People's Revolutionary Party የኢትዮጵያ ሕዝባዊ አብዮታዊ ፓርቲ
- Founded: 9 April 1972
- Headquarters: Washington DC, United States
- Radio: Voice of EPRP
- Armed wing: Ethiopian People's Revolutionary Army (EPRA)
- Ideology: Non-ethnic federalism Social democracy Democratic socialism Historical: Marxism–Leninism (1972–84); Maoism
- Political position: Left-wing (1984–present); Historical: Far-left (1972–1984)
- National affiliation: United Ethiopian Democratic Forces
- Colors: Red and yellow

Website
- www.eprp.com

The Ethiopian People's Revolutionary Party (EPRP) (Amharic: የኢትዮጵያ ሕዝባዊ አብዮታዊ ፓርቲ, romanized: Ye-Ītyōṗṗyā Həzbāwī Abyotawi Party), informally known as Ihapa (Amharic: ኢሕአፓ), is the first modern political party in Ethiopia. Established in April 1972, it aimed to turn Ethiopia into a democratic republic.

Both the EPRP and another party, the All-Ethiopia Socialist Movement (MEISON) were enthusiastic supporters of the student-led 1974 Ethiopian Revolution that eventually led to the toppling of Emperor Haile Selassie and abolishing the monarchy the following year. However, following the rise of Mengistu Haile Mariam to power as leader of the ruling Derg, the military junta that had taken control of Ethiopia, ideological conflict developed between the various groups, culminating in a prolonged armed struggle by the EPRP to dislodge the Derg in collaboration with the efforts of other factions.

== History ==
The EPRP was founded under the name Ethiopian People's Liberation Organization (EPLO) in April 1972 in West Berlin, West Germany, by exiled Ethiopian students and with the assistance of the Democratic Front for the Liberation of Palestine. At this first congress, a Central Committee was elected and included Desta Tadesse, Kiflu Teferra, Kiflu Tadesse, Tesfaye Debessay, Berhane Meskel Reda, Iyasu Alemayehu, and Zeru Kehishen, with the latter four elected to the EPLO Politburo and Berhane Meskel Reda elected the organization's Secretary General.

EPRP logo, circa 1975

For the first few years of its existence, the EPRP was of little importance until the arrival of the Revolution, after which it played a larger role. Over the year following the deposition of Haile Selassie, political and ideological conflict began to emerge between the EPRP and its major Marxist rival, MEISON. Part of their rivalry was based on the fact that, originally, the Derg had no political ideology, beyond the vague patriotic slogan of Itiopiya Tikdem "Ethiopia First" and turned to the leftist Student Movement, with its strong ideological grounding, for guidance; EPRP and MEISON were only two of a large number of groups which competed to be the Derg's political educators. Part of their rivalry was based on Marxist theory: for the Ethiopian Revolution to be an "authentic" one, there needed to be a vanguard party, and both groups wanted that role. Eventually, MEISON came to support the Derg and Mengistu, while the EPRP claimed that the Derg had betrayed the Revolution and stood in the way of a genuine "people's democracy". The political conflict ultimately escalated into violent conflict, with increasing fighting between the two groups. The violence reached its peak in 1976 when the EPRP began to launch attacks on public buildings and assassinate high-ranking Derg officials.

In response, Mengistu condemned the EPRP, claiming it had engaged in a campaign of supposed "White Terror", and initiated a systematic and brutal campaign to exterminate supporters of the EPRP, initially with assistance from MEISON and officials of the local kebeles, known as the "Red Terror", against the EPRP and other political opponents. Surviving members of the EPRP were forced to flee the cities by August 1977, many fleeing to the group's rural stronghold on Mount Asimba in, among other places, Agame, where two of its founders, Tesfay Debessay and Zeru Kehishen, had family ties. There the EPRP received some support from the Eritrean Liberation Front (ELF). Rural operations were conducted by the EPRP’s dedicated military wing, the Ethiopian People’s Revolutionary Army (EPRA). Although there were numerous meetings between the EPRP and other anti-government groups like the Tigray People's Liberation Front (TPLF), eventually the EPRP and the TPLF came to blows. EPRA units attacked TPLF units in two different locations in Agame on 23 February 1978, forcing them to evacuate the area. The TPLF brought two of its veteran companies from the west, and in a fierce counter-attack forced the EPRP fighters back to their bases at Mount Asimba. After a five-day battle, the TPLF captured their mountain stronghold, and the bulk of the defeated EPRP fled to sanctuary with the ELF. Eventually, many party members found their way to Gondar, continuing their struggle against both the Derg and the TPLF until Mengistu's government final defeat at the end of the Ethiopian Civil War in 1991.

With the defeat of the party in 1978 by the TPLF, a faction arose from the EPRP which became the Ethiopian People's Democratic Movement in November 1980, worked under the tutelage of the TPLF. EPDM worked in northern Gondar and Wollo. While claiming to be an all-Ethiopian organisation, the EPDM was mostly Amhara, thus with the fall of the Derg regime it evolved into the Amhara National Democratic Movement.

=== Post-1991 activities ===
Despite the destruction of the Derg in 1991, the EPRP continued to function in exile from Washington, D.C. as one of the original founders of the Coalition of Ethiopian Democratic Forces (COEDF). This was a group of exiled Ethiopian opposition, fighting against the new transitional government. Despite the fall of the Derg, the party still struggled with restrictions on their operations within Ethiopia, as they were still banned and the new Ethiopian People’s Revolutionary Democratic Front government would monitor any activity within the diaspora. They then became part of the United Ethiopian Democratic Forces (UEDF) which is a larger coalition of Ethiopian opposition parties. They gained 52 seats in the Council of People’s Representatives in the Ethiopian parliamentary elections in 2005. An EPRP representative was appointed as Chairman of the UEDF in January 2006. They are an active party currently. The secretary general of the EPRP, Mistresilasie Tamerat stated that there was “physical harassment and arbitrary arrests” of opposition members and suppression of independent media, in the lead up to the Ethiopian parliamentary elections in June 2026.
