= 2024 in Ethiopia =

- Decades: 2000s; 2010s; 2020s
- See also: Other events of 2024; Timeline of Ethiopian history

The following is a list of events predicted and scheduled to take place in the year 2024 in Ethiopia.

== Incumbents ==
- President: Sahle-Work Zewde (until 7 October); Taye Atskeselassie (since 7 October)
- Prime Minister: Abiy Ahmed

== Events ==
=== Ongoing ===
- Fano insurgency
- OLA insurgency
- Gambela conflict
- Smart City Project
- 2024–25 Ethiopian earthquakes

=== January ===
- 1 January –
  - Ethiopia announces an agreement with Somaliland to use 20 kilometers of coastline, including the port of Berbera, in exchange for eventual recognition of the Somaliland Declaration of Independence, which would make it the first country to do so.
  - Ethiopia formally joins the BRICS group.

=== February ===
- 23 February – An airstrike kills at least 15 people and wounds over 20 more in North Shewa. Many of the victims were fleeing clashes between Fano and the Ethiopian government.

=== March ===
- 1 March – Heavy fighting between the Fano militia and the federal government breaks out in Bahir Dar, the capital of Amhara Region.
- 15 March – The Commercial Bank of Ethiopia (CBE) encounters a systematic glitch on its service involving the withdrawal of more than 40 million dollars. CBE officials suspect that the glitch was caused by economic and political reasons and the money was easily transferred to students in Dilla and Jimma University.

=== April ===
- 10 April — Bate Urgessa, a prominent OLF politician and critic of Prime Minister Abiy Ahmed, is found shot dead in Meki, East Shewa Zone in Oromia Region, leading to the arrest of 13 suspects and causing public outrage and international demands for an investigation.
- 12 April — A shootout in Addis Ababa between security forces and Fano members near Millennium Hall leaves one civilian and two Fano members dead and injures two police officers. The police claim the group was intercepted while planning a terrorist attack, with one member killed, another injured and arrested, and the leader fatally wounded.
- 24 April — Seven people are killed after a building collapses on a nearby house in Addis Ababa.

=== July ===
- 9 July – Prime Minister Abiy Ahmed meets in Port Sudan with Sudanese Transitional Sovereignty Council leader and armed forces commander Abdel Fattah al-Burhan to seek an end to the Sudanese Civil War.
- 17 July – Nine police officers are killed in an attack on a police station near the Kumer refugee camp in Amhara Region.
- 21–22 July – 2024 Gofa landslides: At least 257 people are killed in two landslides caused by heavy rains that strike two villages in Gofa Zuria, South Ethiopia Regional State.
- 22 July – Fano's Shewan Chief commander Colonel Asegid Mekonnen surrenders to the Ethiopian security forces.
- 27 July – A boat carrying funeral goers sinks along the Tekeze River in Amhara Region, killing 19 of 26 passengers.
- 29 July – The National Bank of Ethiopia (NBE) imposes a flexible exchange rate policy for the Ethiopian birr as part of economic reforms recommended by the International Monetary Fund.

=== August ===
- 5 August – At least 13 people are killed and 300 others are evacuated following a landslide caused by heavy rains in Kindo Didaye, South Ethiopia.
- 9 August – Ethiopian Airlines signs an agreement with UAE-based consulting firm Dar to design a new airport in Bishoftu expected to be the largest in Africa.
- 19 August – Heaven Awot, a seven-year-old girl is revealed to have been brutally raped, mutilated and murdered by her mother's landlord Getnet Baye in Bahir Dar, Amhara Region in August 2023.

=== September ===
- 4 September - 6 September – Addis Ababa hosts the inaugural Africa Urban Forum (AUF), a forum by the African Union to facilitate dialogue and coordination on sustainable urbanisation and human settlements in Africa.
- 25 September – A bus falls into a river in Wolaita, killing 28 people and wounding 19 more.
- 27 September – a series of earthquakes began with initial epicenter from Afar Region's Awash Fentale and later spread across much of central Ethiopia.

=== October ===
- 7 October – Foreign minister Taye Atskeselassie is elected and inaugurated as president.
- 9 October – Ethiopia is elected to a seat at the United Nations Human Rights Council for a three-year term beginning in 2025.

=== December ===
- 1 December – The Oromo Liberation Army (OLA) and the Government of Oromia Region sign a peace deal in Addis Ababa, after a year of peace talks mediated by Tanzania.
- 7 December – A nationwide electric power blackout occurs due to "system instability".
- 12 December – Ethiopia and Somalia have signed a joint declaration in Ankara, Turkey, to resolve the disputed sovereignty over Somaliland and Ethiopia's access to the Port of the Red Sea.
- 25 December – The Ethiopian National Defense Force closes the country's border with Somalia following heavy fighting in rural areas of Harshin, Fafan Zone, between Ethiopia's Somali regional forces and local clan militias after the killing of a local security chief and his bodyguards. Hundreds of people, including children, flee from their homes.
- 29 December – A truck falls into a river in Bona Zuria, Sidama Region, killing 71 passengers.

== Deaths ==
- 21 February – Getachew Kassa, 79, singer and percussionist.
- 17 September – Beyene Petros, 74, MP, Professor of Biology at Addis Ababa University.

== See also ==
- Ethiopia at the 2024 Summer Olympics
