= 2025 in Ethiopia =

- Decades: 2000s; 2010s; 2020s
- See also: Other events of 2025; Timeline of Ethiopian history

The following is a list of events predicted and scheduled to take place in the year 2025 in Ethiopia.

== Incumbents ==
- President: Taye Atskeselassie
- Prime Minister: Abiy Ahmed

== Events ==
=== Ongoing ===
- Fano insurgency
- Gambela conflict
- Smart City Project
- 2024–25 Ethiopian earthquakes

=== January ===
- 3 January – 2024–25 Ethiopian earthquakes: Volcanic activity is reported in Awash Fentale in Afar Region.
- 10 January – Ethiopia launches its first stock exchange since the imperial period of Haile Selassie.
- 11 January – Somali president Hassan Sheikh Mohamud makes a surprise visit to Ethiopia following their peace agreement in Ankara.

=== February ===
- 8 February – International Monetary Fund Managing Director Kristalina Georgieva makes an official visit to Ethiopia.
- 11 February – A bus overturns in East Welega Zone, Oromia, killing at least 26 people and injuring 42 others.
- 14 February – A magnitude 6.0 earthquake hits Oromia.
- 17 February – Nine people die and 136 others are infected by acute watery diarrhea in four districts of Gambela Region.

=== March ===
- 11 March – Fighters loyal to Tigray People's Liberation Front leader Debretsion Gebremichael take control of Adigrat, Tigray Region.
- 14 March –
  - Fighters loyal to Tigray People's Liberation Front leader Debretsion Gebremichael seize the mayor's office in Mekele.
  - A cholera outbreak in Gambella kills 31 people and infects over 1,500 others.
- 20 March –
  - The Federal Parliamentary Assembly passes a law imposing a tax to cover the Ethiopian Disaster Risk Response Fund established to offset disruption in aid projects caused by suspensions of USAID funding.
  - Armed men abduct dozens from a bus in Oromia region; the Oromo Liberation Army is suspected but denies involvement.
- 22 March – The Ethiopian Army kills over 300 Fano fighters in renewed clashes in Amhara Region. Fano disputes the army's claims, alleging significant casualties on the military.

=== April ===
- 1 April - The passenger ferry Tananesh II begins transnational inland voyages from Djibouti to Ethiopia, en route to Lake Tana.

=== May ===
- 14 May –
  - The National Election Board of Ethiopia deregisters the Tigray People's Liberation Front for failing to hold a general assembly.
  - The Finance Ministry signs $1.7 billion in minerals and energy investment deals, primarily with Chinese firms.
- 31 May – Hasset Dereje finishes first-runner up at Miss World 2025 in India.

=== July ===
- 3 July – Prime Minister Abiy Ahmed announces the completion of the Grand Ethiopian Renaissance Dam.
- 15 July – The National Intelligence and Security Service arrests 82 suspected Islamic State members plotting attacks following nationwide raids.
- 31 July – The government launches a national reforestation program aimed at planting 700 million trees in one day.

=== September ===
- 9 September – Prime Minister Abiy Ahmed inaugurates the Grand Ethiopian Renaissance Dam.
- 25 September – Ethiopia and Russia sign an agreement in Moscow outlining plans for the development and construction of a nuclear power plant.
- 27 September – The Anywaa Forest is designated as a biosphere reserve by UNESCO.

=== October ===
- 1 October – At least 36 people are killed and over 200 others are injured when an under construction church collapses in Areti, Amhara Region.
- 11 October – A magnitude 5.6 earthquake hits Afar Region, killing one person.
- 21 October – A train derails near Shinile in the Somali Region, killing 15 and injuring at least 27.

=== November ===
- 5 November – The Tigray People's Liberation Front is reported to have seized six villages in the Afar Region.
- 13 November – Health authorities announce an outbreak of a suspected viral hemorrhagic fever in the Omo Region with at least eight infections. The following day, officials confirm the illness as Marburg virus, with nine cases identified. By 26 November the health ministry reports six confirmed deaths.
- 23 November – The Hayli Gubbi volcano in Afar Region erupts, sending ash as far as India.

=== December ===
- 11 December – Nine Ethiopian TikTok creators are detained by the police for alleged breaching "social norm of the country" and indecent act at the Ethiopia Creative Awards, an annual TikTok award event. Adonay Berhane, a social media influencer with four million follower of TikTok account, also arrested.
- 20 December – Prime Minister Abiy Ahmed launched Digital Ethiopia 2030 to foster digital transformation and inclusive technology among citizens.

== Deaths ==
- 6 January – Bulcha Demeksa, 94, MP.
- 17 August – Debebe Eshetu, 81 or 82, actor, journalist and human rights advocate.
- 9 November – Lapiso Gedelebo, 87, historian, scholar and writer.
