= 2021 in Ethiopia =

- Decades: 2000s; 2010s; 2020s
- See also: Other events of 2021; Timeline of Ethiopian history

Events in the year 2021 in Ethiopia.

== Incumbents ==
- President: Sahle-Work Zewde
- Prime Minister: Abiy Ahmed

== Events ==
- COVID-19 pandemic in Ethiopia
- Benishangul-Gumuz conflict
- Tigray War
- OLA insurgency

=== January ===
- 3 January – Sudan, Egypt, and Ethiopia agree to hold further talks this month to resolve their dispute over the Grand Ethiopian Renaissance Dam on the Blue Nile.
- 5 January – The government promises to repair the centuries-old Al Nejashi Mosque and the Orthodox Christian of Saint Emmanuel in Wukro that were damaged in December 2020 during the Tigray conflict in the Tigray conflict.
- 6 January
  - Major General Belay Seyoum admits that troops from the Eritrean Army entered Tigray Region in December 2020.
  - An Italian company apologizes for naming a type of pasta "Abissine," reminiscent of the colonial-era fascist name for Ethiopia.
- 9 January – at least 750 people are killed in an Ethiopian Orthodox Tewahedo church in Tigray. Locals blame raiders of the Lost Ark of the Covenant.
- 12 January
  - Approximately 80 civilians were killed around the village of Daletti in Metekel Zone, with opposition politicians blaming Gumuz militias.
- 13 January
  - Tigray: The government says it has killed former Foreign Minister Seyoum Mesfin and two other members of the Tigray Region′s former ruling party.
  - United States Senators Chris Murphy, Patrick Leahy, and Ben Cardin call for the government of Ethiopia to release journalists who have been arrested and to restore press freedom.
  - At least 80 civilians, including children as young as two, are killed in Benishangul-Gumuz Region in what is believed to be ethnic fighting.
- 22 January – The UN says it has received reports of rape in Tigray.

=== February ===
- 2 February – The opposition in Tigray says 50,000 civilians have been killed in the last three months.
- 11 February – Filsan Abdullahi Ahmed, minister for women, confirms widespread rape in the Tigray War. She noted a lack of rape kits and HIV/AIDS drugs to test and treat victims.
- 13 February – Demonstrators protest in Oromia Region against the deteriorating health of Bekele Gerba, Jawar Mohammed, and 18 other members of the Oromo Federalist Congress (OFC) who have been on hunger strike since 27 January. Prison officials refuse to transfer them to a hospital.
- 17 February – A power outage attributed to the TPLF hits Tigray. In an unrelated event, the Tigray council of religious institutions – representing Ethiopian Orthodox, Catholic, Islamic and evangelical churches – calls for the withdrawal of Eritrean forces.
- 19 February – The United States says it will "de-link" its suspension of millions of dollars of aid from the Grand Ethiopian Renaissance Dam. The statement implied that developments in Tigray will be considered.
- 20 February – The TPLF lays out eight conditions for peace in Tigray, including the appointment of an international mediator and unimpeded access for humanitarian aid.

=== March ===
- 1 March – Four media workers in Tigray Region, including a translator for Agence France-Presse, are arrested.
- 3 March
  - The government declares there were "credible allegations of atrocities and human rights abuses" at the Aksum massacre last November.
  - The four media workers in the Tigray Region are freed.
- 4 March – The United Nations Security Council fails to reach a consensus on a resolution to end the Tigray War.
- 10 March – Berhane Kidanemariam, the deputy chief of mission at the Ethiopian embassy in Washington, resigns because of disagreements over policies in Tigray.
- 11 March – Amhara Region spokesperson Gizachew Muluneh denies that its forces are engaged in ethnic cleansing in the Western Zone of Tigray Region, one day after United States Secretary of State Antony Blinken uses the phrase in tesimony.
- 15 March – Médecins Sans Frontières (MSF) reports that 70% of medical facilities in Tigray have been vandalized and looted.
- 18 March – Senator Chris Coons (D-DL) is sent to Ethiopia to express United States' concerns about ethnic cleansing in Tigray.
- 23 March – MSF says its members witnessed four civilians being dragged from a bus and murdered on the road from Mekelle to Adigrat, Tigray.
- 31 March – Militants related to the Oromo Liberation Army (OLA) are accused of killing dozens of civilians in Oromia Region.

=== June ===
- 8 June – Ethiopia begins filling the Grand Renaissance Dam (GERD).
- 18 June – Operation Alula begins
- 30 June - Ethiopian forces retreat from Mekelle, the capital of Tigray, ahead of the advancing Tigrayan troops.

=== July ===
- 29 July – Tigray conflict begins to spread as intense fighting is being reported in Ethiopia's Amhara state.

=== August ===
- 5 August – Tigrayan rebels capture the city of Lalibela.
- 10 August – Ethiopian Prime Minister Abiy Ahmed calls on civilians to join the war in Tigray.
- 11 August – Ethiopian rebels TPLF and Oromo Liberation Army agree on a military alliance to fight federal Ethiopian forces.

=== December ===
- 11 December – 22 members of Kawarja Islamists are reportedly arrested in the Bale Zone of Oromia regional state of Ethiopia. According to a report by Ethiopian Broadcasting Corporation (EBC), which cited police authority from the zone, they were captured in a joint security forces operation.

=== Scheduled events ===
- 5 June – Scheduled date for the 2021 Ethiopian general election.
- TBA – The Ethiopian Accident Investigation Bureau says its report on the 2019 Ethiopian Airlines Flight 302 crash will be published in the near future.

== Sports ==
- 2020–21 Ethiopian Premier League
- 24 August to 5 September 2021 – Ethiopia at the 2020 Summer Paralympics

== Deaths ==
- 13 January – Tigray People's Liberation Front (TPLF) leaders: Seyoum Mesfin (former Ministry of Foreign Affairs, 1991–2010); Abay Tsehaye (former Minister of Federal Affairs, 2001), and Asmelash Woldeselassie (politician); killed during military action.
- 7 April – Mitiku Belachew, 78, Ethiopian-born Belgian surgeon.
- 11 May – Zemi Yenus, 61, businesswoman and autism activist.
- 2 September – Alemayehu Eshete, 80, singer.

== See also ==
- 2021 in East Africa
- COVID-19 pandemic in Africa
- Grand Ethiopian Renaissance Dam
- Common Market for Eastern and Southern Africa
- African Continental Free Trade Area
