= 2023 in Ethiopia =

- Decades: 2000s; 2010s; 2020s
- See also: Other events of 2023; Timeline of Ethiopian history

Events in the year 2023 in Ethiopia.

== Incumbents ==
- President: Sahle-Work Zewde
- Prime Minister: Abiy Ahmed

== Events ==
=== Ongoing ===
- Fano insurgency
- OLA insurgency
- Gambela conflict
- Smart City Project

=== January ===
- 11 January – 15 Amhara IDPs and civilians killed in Haro Kebele by Oromo Special Forces (regional forces).
- 12 January – Ethiopian Security forces arrested and detained members of the Ethiopian Human Rights Council named, Bereket Daniel, Nahom Hussien, Daniel Tesfaye, and Bizuayehu Wendimu,
- 20 January – 98 civilians killed by the Oromo Liberation Army (OLA) along with other ethnic Oromo militants in multiple Amhara villages in North Shewa, Amhara Region. 155 people injured and 1,930 houses damaged (set on fire).
- 23 January – 25-episcopate was formed in Oromia and Southern Nations, Nationalities, and Peoples' Region, led by Abune Sawiros, which is condemned by the Holy Synod of the Ethiopian Orthodox Church, led by Patriarch Abune Mathias. The incident resulted in schism in the Ethiopian Orthodox Tewahedo Church.

=== February ===
- 3 February – Ethiopian prime minister Abiy Ahmed met with officials of the Tigray People's Liberation Front for the first time since the signing of a peace treaty in November.
- Early February – 3 to 8 people killed when police attacked the Ethiopian Orthodox Church in Addis Ababa.
- 15 February – 50 ethnic Amharas killed by Oromo militants in the Oromia region.
- 25 February – The Murle ethnic militiamen from South Sudan crossed in to Ethiopia and killed and injured civilians in Boy kebele of the Agnewak zone in Gambela. The Murle militiamen also killed and guns were seized.
- 28 February – Police attacked civilians during the 127th Adwa Victory Celebrations and inside the religious congregation at the Saint George Church. At least one person shot by a security force. ReliefWeb reported that the victim is an Amhara and a civics teacher at a high school.

=== March ===
- 7 March – UN's High Commissioner stated that there needs to be tangible progress on accountability for the ongoing conflict-related violations and abuses in the country. He also calls on the implementation of the report by his Office and the Ethiopian Human Rights Commission.
- 8 March – Human rights activist and journalist Meaza Mohammed received the 2023 International Women of Courage Award which was hosted by Department of State in Washington DC.
- 10 March – Secretary of State Antony Blinken visited Ethiopia and announced new U.S. Aid to "advance" vital steps for building peace and stability in the country.
- 16 March – The Addis Ababa City Administration banned about 10,000 tuk-tuk (″Bajaj") taxis. The Ethiopian Human Rights Commission published a statement explaining the rights violations and calling on the administration to lift the restrictions.
- 18 March – Finance minister stated that minimum of USD20 billion is needed to rebuild the devastated northern part of Ethiopia which includes the Afar, Amhara and Tigray regions.
- 18 March – ReliefWeb reported the critical needs of tens of thousands of Amhara IDPs in North Shewa and other parts of the Amhara Region. It also highlighted the widespread malaria cases in Afar— the highest in the past five years. The resumption of services in Tigray was also covered in the report.
- 20 March – OCHA classified locations (woredas) occupied by 600,000 Amhara IDPs as hotspots.
- 22 March – Daniel Bekele, Chief Commissioner of the Ethiopian Human Rights Commission briefed UN member states at the 36th Meeting – 52nd Regular Session of the Human Rights Council. He made calls to the international community to support and coordinate Transitional justice efforts in Ethiopia.
- 22 March – UNHCR reported that about 100,000 new Somali refugees arrived in Ethiopia in February 2023 alone and called for urgent funding. Erupted hostilities in Laascaanood town reported as the main cause for this displacement.
- 22 March – In May 2021, the Council of ministers designated the TPLF as a terrorist group. Following the peace agreement, the Parliament voted in March 2023 to remove TPLF from the list of terrorist organisations.
- 23 March – OCHA reported 2,276 cholera cases in East Bale, Guji and Borena zones of Oromia and Daawa Zone of Somali regions.

=== April ===
- From 3 April – New wave of crackdown and arbitrary arrests primarily against ethnic Amhara journalists and activists by the government.
- From 2 April – Protests across the Amhara Region erupted following governments' announcement to disband the Amhara Regional forces. Prosperity Party has been accused of enforcing measures to disband the Amhara forces while the controversial disarmament of Tigray forces remained unresolved, and the Oromia regional forces still heavily armed. Both have been taken as major threat for the Amhara.
- 2 April – VOA reported that at least 21 fatalities, 10 severe injuries and over 5800 displacement due to flood in Gofa Zone, in the Uba Debretsehay of the SNNPR.
- 6 April – Based on ReliefWeb, about 24 million Ethiopians live in drought affected areas and about 11 million of them need food assistance. About 2.05 billion USD is required for the response.
- 7 April – ReliefWeb reported that there was at least 2624 targeted civilian fatalities from April 2022 to 2023.
- 12 April – Questions re-surfaced on the legitimacy of Abiy Ahmed doctoral thesis.
- 27 April – Cholera outbreak continued in the Gamo-Gofa of SNNPR region.
- 27 April – Girma Yeshitila, head of Abiy's Prosperity Party was assassinated during work related travel. The Amhara blamed Abiy Ahmed for plots and assassination.

=== May ===
- 6 May – Umer Lema of the Afar Prosperity Party official was assassinated while traveling for work in the Oromia Region. VOA reported that additional 6 people including Umer's brother were also shot dead.
- 6 May – Ethiopian Peace Observatory (ACLD) reported on volatilities in the Amhara Region. The region had the highest number of recorded events and fatalities due to political violence in April, with 26 events and 47 reported fatalities. Over 68% of all reported fatalities in the country were recorded in the Amhara region.
- 9 May – ReliefWeb reported that close to 750 people crossed to Metema from Sudan on 9 May alone. Until May 9, more than 17,500 people have crossed through the Metema border point since April 21.
- 9 May – Daniel Bekele of the EHRC provided update to the Parliament on the continued volatile situations and concerns in the Amhara Region related to the increase in human rights violations following governments' military actions.
- 10 May – The National Election Board of Ethiopia presented its concern to the Parliament on the issues of government authorities arresting, and abusing opposition parties and preventing them from holding meetings. The opposition parties persecuted by include Balderas for True Democracy Party, Enat Party, and Gogot or Gurage Unity and Justice Party.
- 12 May – Four fatalities and five injuries reported in Kasagita, Awsi Rasu, Afar Region due to mortar explosion. OCHA reported the need for land marking and clearance of explosive remnant of war remain from the TPLF attacking of Afar is high. In addition over 1000 Dengue fever cases were also reported in the region.
- 12 May – OCHA reported that at least 18,500 have crossed the Metema, Amhara border from Sudan since 21 April, with close to 500 new arrivals on 11 May.
- 12 May – Over 71,000 displaced due to excessive rains between March and May mainly in Sidama, SNNP, Oromia and Somali.
- 19 May – U.S. Embassy in Addis Ababa published travel restrictions to Gambela and Benishangul Gumuz Regions due to crime, kidnapping, ethnically motivated violence, and sporadic violent conflict.

=== June ===
- 2 June – Authorities continued demolishing Mosques in Addis Ababa. At least 3 worshippers killed by police.
- 2 June – Ethiopian Human Rights Commission reported imprisonment of hundreds of refugees and asylum seekers from Eritrea imprisoned.
- 8 June – USAID said, in coordination with the Ethiopian government, that a "widespread and coordinated campaign is diverting food assistance from the people of Ethiopia."
- 25 June – Birtukan Mideksa, chairwoman of the National Election Board of Ethiopia since 2018 announced her resignation.
- 30 June – ReliefWeb reported that the security in situation in the Amhara Region remains volatile and there are about 583.5K IDPs across the region, including 245K school-age (3–18) children. At least 4086 schools are damaged and unable to resume the education process. As of June 2023, 902K children remain out of school, from both IDPs and host community.

=== July ===
- 14 July – OCHA reported that Cholera outbreak continues spreading across 74 woredas in Oromia, Somali, Sidama and SNNPR for almost a year.
- 15 July – Abiy Ahmed's regime continued deporting Eritrean refugees from Ethiopia. UN urged the government to stop detaining, and deporting asylum seekers and migrants.
- 20 July – VOA Amharic published that curfew is imposed in Gambela due to the renewed ethnic violence that led to killing of unspecified number of people, property destruction and civilians displacements.

=== August ===
- 1 August – Fano and ENDF began intense clashes in Debre Tabor and Kobo.
- 4 August – The Sudanese state of El Gedaref closes its border with Ethiopia after heavy fighting break out between Fano militia men and the Ethiopian army in the Amhara region.
- 4 August – Due to the clashes between Fano and ENDF, the Ethiopian government declared a six-month state of emergency in the Amhara Region. The war was waged by Abiy Ahmed in April 2023 with measures to consolidate power by dissolving the Fano militia and Amhara Special Forces in the Amhara region. Series of peaceful protests were held following this announcement that led to war between Fano and the Ethiopian government.
- 26 August – Four people are killed and twenty are injured in a grenade attack by a former TDF combatant in Mekelle, Tigray.
- 29 August – The United Nations reports that at least 183 people have been killed during recent clashes between Fano militiamen and security forces in Amhara Region.

=== November ===
- 14 November – USAID announces the resumption of food aid distribution to Ethiopia following an agreement with the Ethiopian government on enhanced monitoring measures. USAID suspended aid delivery in June due to allegations of diversion.

== Deaths ==
- 27 April – Girma Yeshitila, 49 or 50, head of Amhara Region Prosperity Party, assassination.
- 6 May– Umer Lema of the Afar Prosperity Party, assassination.
- 12 May – Hirut Bekele, 80, singer.

== See also ==
- Human rights in Ethiopia
- Timeline of the Tigray War
