= 2022 in Ethiopia =

- Decades: 2000s; 2010s; 2020s
- See also: Other events of 2022; Timeline of Ethiopian history

Events in the year 2022 in Ethiopia.

== Incumbents ==
- President: Sahle-Work Zewde
- Prime Minister: Abiy Ahmed

== Events ==
=== Ongoing ===
- Benishangul-Gumuz conflict
- OLA insurgency
- Tigray War
- COVID-19 pandemic

=== January ===
- 7 January – At least 56 people are killed by an airstrike on an IDP camp in Dedebit, Tigray Region, Ethiopia.

=== February ===
- 2 March – Twenty Ethiopian soldiers, 30 attackers, and three civilians are killed in the Metekel Zone of Benishangul-Gumuz Region.

=== June ===
- 18 June – The OLA militant commits ethnic massacre against Amhara civilians in Gimbi town, Oromia Region.

=== July ===
- 20 July – About 500 al-Shabaab fighters cross into Ethiopia's Somali Region Afder Zone in context of invasion of Ethiopia.

=== October ===
- 4 October – Tigray war: The Ethiopian National Defense Force launched airstrike against Adi Daero school, killing more than 50 people and injures 70 others.
- 25 October – Tigray War peace talks mediated by the African Union is formally being held for the first time in Johannesburg, South Africa.

=== November ===
- 2 November – Ethiopian and Tigrayan forces agreed to permanently cease any hostilities, ending the 2 year war in Tigray.

=== December ===
- 6 December –
  - Hundreds of people held demonstrations across Oromia following reports of hostilities across the region.
  - Oromo militias calls upon residents of Oromia to take up arms for "self-defense".

== Deaths ==
- 3 March – Abune Merkorios, 83, Co-Patriarch of the Ethiopian Orthodox Tewahedo Church.
- 27 September – Madingo Afework, 44, singer.
- 6 November – Ali Birra, 72, singer and composer.
- 10 December – Tariku Birhanu, 39, actor and director.

== See also ==
- Timeline of the Tigray War
