= Ethiopia–Somalia relations =

Bilateral relations

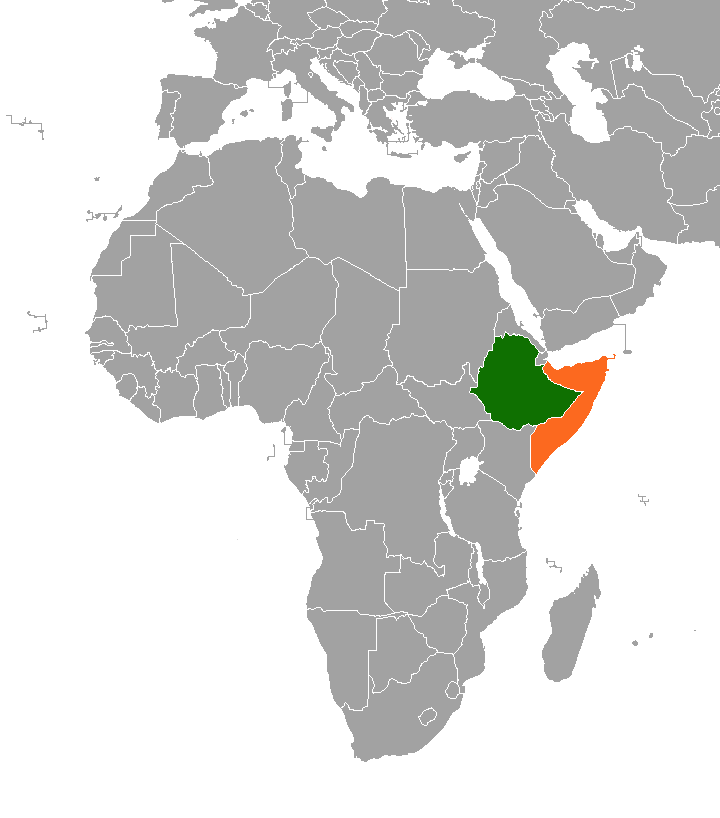

- Ethiopia: Somalia

Ethiopia–Somalia relations (Somali: Xiriirka Itoobiya-Soomaaliya) are bilateral relations between Ethiopia and Somalia. These relations are characterized by the land border shared by the two countries and a number of military conflicts in past years.

== History ==
=== Background ===
Relations between the peoples of Somalia and Ethiopia stretch back to antiquity, to a common origin. The Ethiopian region is one of the proposed homelands of the Horn of Africa's various Afro-Asiatic communities.

=== Pre-20th Century ===
The earliest form of Ethiopian-Somali conflict dates back to the 14th century, when Mamluk Sultan an-Nasir Muhammad began destroying Coptic churches. Amda Seyon I, the Emperor of Ethiopia, subsequently sent a mission to Cairo in 1321-2 threatening to retaliate against the Muslims in his kingdom and divert the course of the Nile if the sultan did not end his persecution. As a result of the dispute, Haqq ad-Din I of the Ifat Sultanate seized and imprisoned the delegates sent by the Emperor as they were returning from Cairo. Amda Seyon responded by invading Ifat and killing many of Ifat's soldiers. Part of the army then followed him and destroyed its capital, Zeila, with Amda Seyon plundering its wealth in the form of gold, silver, bronze, lead, and clothing. Amda Seyon continued his reprisals throughout all of his Muslim provinces, taking livestock, killing many inhabitants, destroying towns, and taking prisoners, who were later assimilated. This would lead to long-term hostilities and animosity between the two states, resulting in multiple Ifat rebellions against Ethiopian hegemony.

The first mention of the ethnonym "Somali" in Ethiopian records dates back to the reign of Emperor Yeshaq I who had one of his court officials compose a hymn celebrating a military victory over the Sultan of Ifat's eponymous troops.

In response to centuries of mistreatment of Muslims by the Ethiopian Empire, the 16th century leader of the Adal Sultanate (a successor of Ifat), Ahmad ibn Ibrahim al-Ghazi united the Muslims of the Horn of Africa, and, with the support of the Ottoman Empire, led an invasion of Abyssinia which brought much of the Christian polity under Muslim control. However, the Ethiopians managed to secure the assistance of the Portuguese Empire and maintained their domain's autonomy, defeating and slaying Ahmad at the Battle of Wayna Daga. Both polities in the process exhausted their resources and manpower, which resulted in the contraction of both powers and changed regional dynamics for centuries to come. Many historians trace the origins of hostility between Somalia and Ethiopia to this war. Some scholars also argue that this conflict proved, through their use on both sides, the value of firearms such as the matchlock musket, cannons and the arquebus over traditional weapons.

=== 20th Century ===
In 1948, under pressure from their World War II allies and to the dismay of the Somalis, the British authorities in British Somaliland "returned" the Haud — an important Somali pastoral area that was presumably 'protected' by British treaties with the Somalis in 1884 and 1886 — and the Ogaden to Ethiopia, based on a treaty they signed in 1897 in which the British ceded Somali territory to the Ethiopian Emperor Menelik in exchange for his help against Somali raids. Britain included the provision that the Somali inhabitants would retain their autonomy, but Ethiopia immediately claimed sovereignty over the area. This prompted an unsuccessful bid by Britain in 1956 to buy back the Somali lands it had turned over.

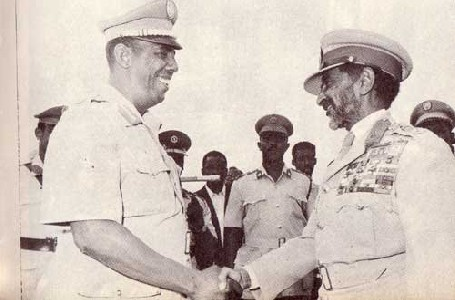
Somali President Siad Barre (1969–1991), left, and visiting Ethiopian Emperor Haile Selassie (r. 1930–1974) in Mogadishu, October 1971.

Tensions over the Ogaden region later flared up again immediately after Somalia had acquired its independence in 1960. On 16 June 1963, Somali guerrillas started an insurgency at Hodayo after Ethiopian Emperor Haile Selassie rejected their demand for self-government in the Ogaden. The Somali government initially refused to support the guerrilla forces, which eventually numbered about 3,000. However, in January 1964, after Ethiopia sent reinforcements to the Ogaden, Somali forces launched ground and air attacks across the border and started providing assistance to the guerrillas. The Ethiopian Air Force responded with retaliatory strikes across the southwestern frontier against Feerfeer, northeast of Beledweyne and Galkacyo. On 6 March 1964, the Somali and Ethiopian authorities agreed to a cease-fire. At the end of the month, the two sides signed an accord in Khartoum, Sudan, pledging to withdraw their troops from the border, cease hostile propaganda, and start peace negotiations. Somalia also terminated its support of the guerrillas.

In July 1977, the Ogaden War broke out after the Siad Barre government in Somalia sought to incorporate the Ogaden into a Pan-Somali Greater Somalia. In the first week of the conflict, Somali armed forces took southern and central Ogaden and for most of the war, the Somali army scored continuous victories on the Ethiopian army and followed them as far as Sidamo. By September 1977, Somalia controlled 90 percent of the Ogaden and captured strategic cities such as Jijiga and put heavy pressure on Dire Dawa, threatening the train route from the latter city to Djibouti. After the siege of Harar, a Soviet-led coalition of 20,000 Cuban forces and several thousand Russian experts came to the aid of Ethiopia's communist Derg regime. By 1978, the Somali troops were ultimately pushed out of the Ogaden. This shift in support by the Soviet Union motivated the Barre government to seek allies elsewhere, eventually enabling it to build the largest army on the continent. On the 6th of April 1988 a peace agreement was signed between the two countries ending the support of rebel groups in their respective nations.

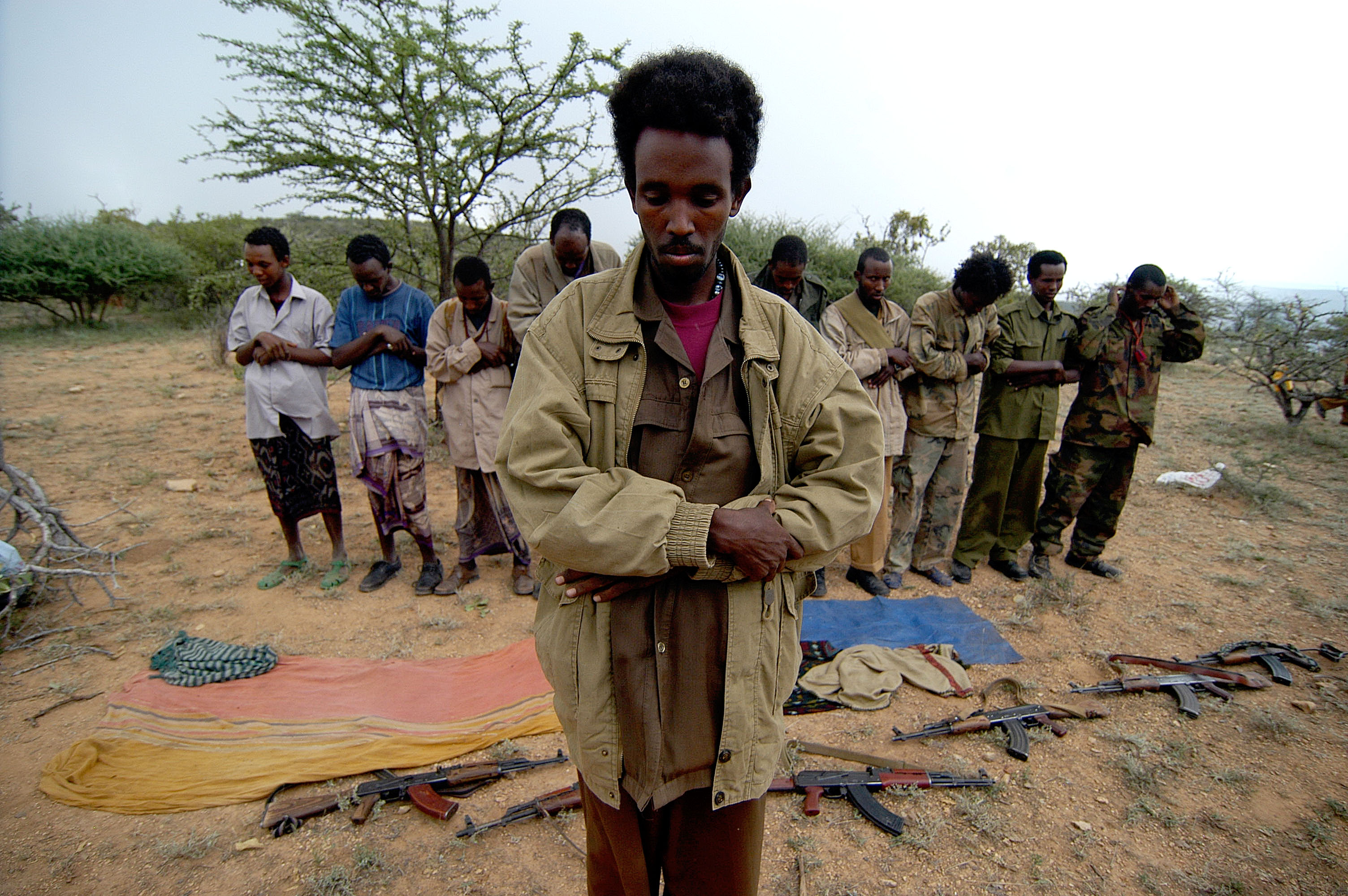
ONLF separatist rebels fighting for the right to self-determination for Somalis in the Somali Region of Ethiopia.

With changes in leadership in the early 1990s brought on by the outbreak of the Somali Civil War and Ethiopian Civil War, respectively, relations between the Somali and Ethiopian authorities entered a new phase.

=== 21st Century (2000-2019) ===
In 2006, the Islamic Courts Union (ICU) assumed control of much of the southern part of Somalia and promptly imposed Shari'a law. The newly established Transitional Federal Government sought to reaffirm its authority, and, with the assistance of Ethiopian troops, African Union peacekeepers and air support by the United States, managed to drive out the rival ICU. Following this defeat, the Islamic Courts Union splintered into several different factions. Some of the more radical elements, including Al-Shabaab, regrouped to continue their insurgency against the TFG and oppose the Ethiopian military's presence in Somalia. By January 2009, the militias had managed to force the Ethiopian troops to retreat. Between 31 May and 9 June 2008, representatives of Somalia's TFG and the Alliance for the Re-liberation of Somalia (ARS) group of Islamist rebels participated in peace talks in Djibouti brokered by the UN. The conference ended with a signed agreement calling for the withdrawal of Ethiopian troops in exchange for the cessation of armed confrontation. Parliament was subsequently expanded to 550 seats to accommodate ARS members, which then elected its leader to office.

In October 2011, a coordinated multinational operation began against Al-Shabaab in southern Somalia, with the Ethiopian military eventually joining the mission the following month. According to Ramtane Lamamra, the AU Commissioner for Peace and Security, the additional Ethiopian and AU troop reinforcements are expected to help the Somali authorities gradually expand their territorial control.

The Federal Government of Somalia was later established on August 20, 2012, representing the first permanent central government in the country since the start of the civil war. The following month, Hassan Sheikh Mohamud was elected as the new Somali government's first President, with the Ethiopian authorities welcoming his selection and newly appointed Prime Minister of Ethiopia Hailemariam Desalegn attending Mohamud's inauguration ceremony.

=== 2020s ===
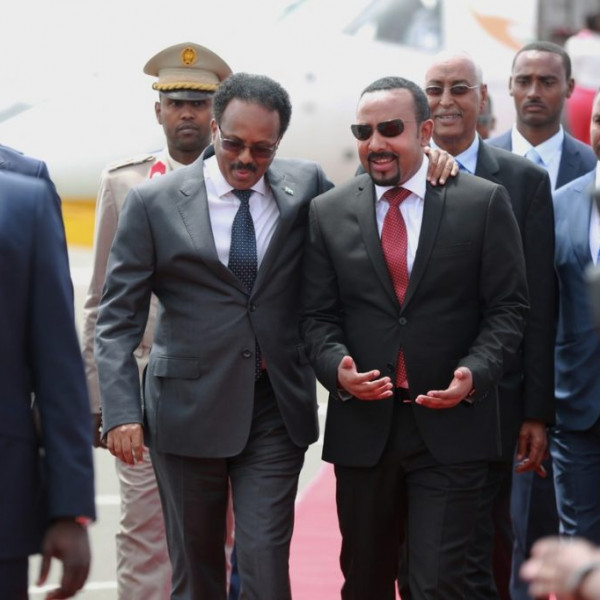
Somali President Mohamed Abdullahi Farmajo with Ethiopian Prime Minister Abiy Ahmed in 2021.

On 1 January 2024, Ethiopia and Somaliland signed a memorandum of understanding giving Ethiopia access to the Red Sea via the port of Berbera in return for recognizing Somaliland. The announcement infuriated Somalia, which recalled its ambassador to Ethiopia and immediately declared blocking the accord a national priority. On January 6, Somali President Hassan Sheikh Mohamud signed a parliamentary bill declaring the deal “null and void”, though this step was mostly rhetorical. On 12 December 2024, Ethiopia and Somalia reached an agreement to end their dispute following talks in Turkey.

On 27 February 2025, Ethiopian Prime Minister Abiy Ahmed visited Mogadishu for talks with Somali President Hassan Sheikh Mohamud, marking a step toward mending strained relations. Tensions escalated in January 2024 when Ethiopia announced plans to lease a coastline in Somaliland, prompting Somalia to accuse it of violating its sovereignty. The two nations agreed in December, under Ankara's mediation, to seek commercial solutions for Ethiopia’s sea access. Despite a mortar attack near Mogadishu airport before Abiy's arrival, the leaders reaffirmed cooperation. Abiy's visit followed Mohamud’s January trip to Addis Ababa. Somalia continues to battle an insurgency by al Shabaab militants linked to Al Qaeda.
