= 2018 in Ethiopia =

- Decades: 1990s; 2000s; 2010s; 2020s
- See also: Other events of 2018; Timeline of Ethiopian history

The following lists events in the year 2018 in Ethiopia.

== Incumbents ==
- President: Mulatu Teshome
- Prime Minister: Hailemariam Desalegn (until 15 February, care-taker from 15 February to 2 April), Abiy Ahmed Ali (from 2 April)

== Events ==
=== January ===
- 3 January – Prime Minister Hailemariam Desalegn announces that he will drop charges on political prisoners and close the camp of Maekelawi in effort he claims to "widen the democratic space for all".
- 22 January – Seven people die in clashes over the weekend in Woldiya, Amhara Region between security forces and Ethiopian Orthodox worshippers taking part in the ceremony of Timkat.

=== February ===
- 15 February – Prime Minister Hailemariam Desalegn resigns from office, becoming the first politician to resign from office in modern Ethiopian history.

=== April ===
- 2 April – the Ethiopian Parliament elected Abiy Ahmed as a new prime minister of Ethiopia and a chairman of EPRDF after primary election in March 2018.

=== June ===
- 23 June – A grenade attack occurred in Meskel Square, Addis Ababa during pro-Abiy rally. The grenade explosion occurred just after finishing his speech at the stage and ushered by security officials. The explosion resulted in the deaths of two people and injured 44 others.

=== July ===
- 9 July – Eritrea and Ethiopia officially declare an end to their twenty-year conflict.
- 14 July – Prime Minister Abiy Ahmed made landmark visit to Eritrea and welcomed by Eritrean President Isaias Afwerki.
- 26 July – Simegnew Bekele, a project manager of the Grand Ethiopian Renaissance Dam, died in his car parked in Meskel Square. Police autopsy concluded Simegnew died from gunshot wound and a handgun was retrieved.

=== August ===
- 11–12 August – Paramilitaries from Somalia reportedly attacked the East Hararghe Zone in Oromia Region, killing at least 40 people.

== Deaths ==
- 18 April – Tamrat Desta, 39, singer-songwriter.
- 15 December – Girma Wolde-Giorgis, 93, President of Ethiopia (2001– 2013).
