= 2020 in Ethiopia =

- Decades: 2000s; 2010s; 2020s
- See also: Other events of 2020; Timeline of Ethiopian history

Events of 2020 in Ethiopia.

== Incumbents ==
- President: Sahle-Work Zewde
- Prime Minister: Abiy Ahmed

== Events ==
=== Ongoing ===
- Benishangul-Gumuz conflict
- Tigray War
- COVID-19 pandemic
- OLA insurgency

=== January–March ===
- 14 February – U.S. Secretary of State Mike Pompeo begins a visit to Senegal, Angola, and Ethiopia.
- 20 February – The Netherlands returns a stolen crown to the Government of Ethiopia.
- 29 February – Egypt says it will use "all means" to defend its interests in a dispute with Ethiopia and Sudan over the new dam on the Nile River.
- 13 March – First case of the COVID-19 pandemic was reported.
- 25 March – At least 60 people believed to be migrants from Ethiopia are found dead in a cargo container in Tete, Mozambique.

=== April–June ===
- 13 April – 14,000 cases of COVID-19 and 788 deaths have been reported across Africa. Cases by country: Comoros – 0, Djibouti – 214, Eritrea – 34, Ethiopia – 71, Kenya – 197, Madagascar – 106, Malawi – 13, Mauritius – 324, Mozambique – 21, Rwanda – 126, São Tomé and Príncipe – 4, Somalia – 25, South Sudan – 4, Tanzania – 32, Uganda – 54, Zambia – 43, Zimbabwe – 14
- 24 April – One million people in Ethiopia face hunger due to crop destruction by locust swarms. Swarms have been reported in Ethiopia, Eritrea, Djibouti, Somalia, Kenya, Uganda, South Sudan, and Tanzania.
- 8 May
  - Bereket Simon, former Communications Minister for the Ethiopian People's Revolutionary Democratic Front, was convicted of corruption and sentenced to six years of prison. Tadesse Kassa, a former TIRET Corporation board member, was also convicted.
  - A hospital in Kilembe, Uganda and a small town Somalia are washed away in flooding; an unspecified number of people are killed.
  - Hundreds protest when the government destroys 7,000 homes and a market in Kariobangi, Kenya.
- 12 May – Sudan pushes Ethiopia to resume discussion related to the $4.6 billion Grand Ethiopian Renaissance Dam on the Nile River.

=== July–September ===
- 1 July – 166 people are killed in protests after the death of Ethiopian singer Hachalu Hundessa.
- 4 September – Elections are announced for 8 September in Tigray Region.
- 7 September – Journalists are banned from observing the elections in Tigray. The government says the elections are illegal.
- 9 September – The Tigray regional election is held in Tigray, as the Ethiopian government condemning it.

=== October–December ===
- 3 November – At least dozen of peoples were massacred in ethnic violence in Gawa Qanqa, southwest Ethiopia.
- 4 November – "Scores, probably hundreds" of civilians are killed in Aksum in the Tigray conflict, northern Ethiopia.
- 7 November – The Ethiopian parliament voted to endorse the creation of an interim government for the northern Tigray region
- 9 November – Up to 500 civilians were alleged to have been killed in a massacre in the town of Mai Kadra. Most of the victims were Amhara people, but there are conflicting reports regarding the aggressors, Amnesty International suggesting that both Tigrayan forces and Ethiopian federal forces were involved in the massacres.
- 14 November – multiple rockets launched from Ethiopia hit Asmara, the capital city of Eritrea. UN Secretary-General António Guterres warns the Tigray conflict in Ethiopia may destabilize the entire Horn of Africa.
- 15 November – 25,000 refugees flee from Tigray, to Sudan while the Federal Ethiopian Government invades the Ethiopian region of Tigray.
- 17 November – Mekelle was hit by an air strike, killing two civilians and injuring several others.
- 18 November – The Prime Minister was reported as saying that the Ethiopian Army was advancing on Mekelle, and had captured the cities of Shire and Axum.
- 25 November – The Organization of African Unity sends ex-presidents Joaquim Chissano (Mozambique), Ellen Johnson Sirleaf (Liberia), and Kgalema Motlanthe (South Africa) to Addis Ababa to negotiate a peace.
- 27 November – The first of four United Nations humanitarian flights land in Khartoum carrying 32 tons aid from the UNHCR.
- 28–29 November – Seven to eight hundred civilians are massacred by the Ethiopian National Defense Force and Eritrean Army in the Aksum massacre.
- 8 December – Tigray war: Government forces shoot at and temporarily detain representatives of the United Nations as they try to reach the Tigray Region. Camps holding 100,000 refugees in Eritrea are said to be without food.
- 15 December – Sudan says that "Ethiopian forces and militias" ambushed Sudanese army forces near Jabal Abutiour, Sudan. Sudanese Prime Minister Abdalla Hamdok visited Ethiopia briefly on 13 December to discuss the security situation.
- 17 December – The U.N. pledges US$35.6 million in civilian aid for the Tigray Region, including $25 million for Ethiopia and $10.6 million in Sudan.
- 21 December – Tigray conflict: The African Union says the military action of the Ethiopian government in Tigray was "legitimate".
- 23 December – The Amhara Mass Media Agency says that dozens of people have been killed along ethnic lines in Benishangul-Gumuz Region. Attacks in September and October in the same region killed 14 and displaced 300 people.
- 28 December
  - Reuters Group cameraman Kumerra Gemechu, 36, is arrested for undisclosed reasons.
  - Banks reopen in Mekelle.
- 31 December – The government human rights commission says 76 people were killed and 200 wounded in June and July during unrest following the killing of Hachalu Hundessa. The commission said a total of 123 people were killed and at least 500 were injured.

== Deaths ==
- 5 February: Abadi Hadis, 22, Olympic long-distance runner (2016 Summer Olympics).
- 29 June: Hachalu Hundessa, 34, singer.
- 8 November – Raphael Hadane, 97, Ethiopian-Israeli religious leader, Kahen of Beta Israel.
- 19 November – Kitilaa Guddata, 32, teacher from Sekela, Oromia Region; executed by Oromia Special Police Force.
- 12 December – Fikre Selassie Wogderess, 75, politician, Prime Minister (1987–1989); complications from diabetes.
- 17 December – Tesfaye Gessesse, 83, actor, General Director of the Hager Fikir Theatre (1974–1975).
- 29 December – Agitu Ideo Gudeta, 42, farmer, entrepreneur, and environmentalist

== See also ==
- Battle of Mekelle (2020)
- Asmara rocket attacks
- Mai Kadra massacre
- Grand Ethiopian Renaissance Dam
- 2020 in East Africa
- COVID-19 pandemic in Ethiopia
- COVID-19 pandemic in Africa
- Tigray conflict
- Transitional Government of Tigray
