= 2019 in Ethiopia =

- Decades: 1990s; 2000s; 2010s; 2020s
- See also: Other events of 2019; Timeline of Ethiopian history

Events of 2019 in Ethiopia.

== Events ==
=== Ongoing ===
- Benishangul-Gumuz conflict (since June)
- Ethiopian civil conflict (2018–present)
- OLA insurgency

=== March ===
- 10 March – Ethiopian Airlines Flight 302 from Addis Ababa Bole International Airport in Ethiopia to Jomo Kenyatta International Airport in Nairobi, Kenya crashed six minutes after takeoff near the town of Bishoftu, killing all 149 passengers and eight crew aboard.

=== June ===
- 22 June – Factions of the Amhara Region's Peace and Security Bureau assassinated the Amhara Regional President Ambachew Mekonnen. An Amhara nationalist bodyguard also assassinated General Se'are Mekonnen, the Chief of General Staff of the Ethiopian National Defense Force, as well as his aide Major General Gizae Aberra.
- 24 June – The Ethiopian state television announced that the Chief of the Amhara Region security Asaminew Tsige was shot to death after the government's accusation of plotting the 22 June Amhara Region coup.

=== July ===
- 29 July – Prime Minister Abiy Ahmed leads a reforestation effort that planted 350 million trees in one day, believed to be a world record.

=== October ===
- 5 October – The first ever Irreechaa was celebrated in Addis Ababa's Meskel Square with hundreds of thousands Oromos attended.
- 11 October – The Nobel Peace Prize was awarded to Prime Minister Abiy Ahmed for "his efforts to achieve peace and international cooperation, and in particular for his decisive initiative to resolve the border conflict with neighbouring Eritrea".
- 23–28 October – Clashes erupted in Oromia Region and its vicinity after Oromo political activist Jawar Mohammed posting a Facebook page that claimed he was surrounded by police officers at his home. An ensuing violence between his supporting protestors and the federal security forces left 86 people died. 76 were killed in communal violence while 10 were from security officers.

=== November ===
- 16 November – EPRDF members parties from Afar, Benishangul, Gambela and Somali Region merged into form a new party rebranded itself as Prosperity Party.

=== December ===
- 1 December – The Prosperity Party was formally formed in Addis Ababa.
- 20 December – Ethiopia launches the first experimental satellite into space with the help of China from Taiyuan Satellite Launch Center.

== Deaths ==
=== March ===
- 10 March
  - Victims of Ethiopian Airlines Flight 302 plane crash:
    - Pius Adesanmi, Nigerian-Canadian professor and writer (b. 1972)
    - Christine Alalo, Ugandan police officer and peacekeeper (b. 1970)
    - Sebastiano Tusa, Italian archaeologist and politician (b. 1952)

=== June ===
- 22 June
  - Ambachew Mekonnen, politician, assassination (b. 1971)
  - Se'are Mekonnen, army officer, Chief of General Staff (2018–2019), assassination (b. 1954)
- 24 June – Asaminew Tsige, general, assassination (b. 1958 or 1959)
