= 2017 in Ethiopia =

- Decades: 1990s; 2000s; 2010s; 2020s
- See also: Other events of 2017; Timeline of Ethiopian history

The following lists events in the year 2017 in Ethiopia.

== Incumbents ==
- President: Mulatu Teshome
- Prime Minister: Hailemariam Desalegn

== Events ==
=== Ongoing ===
- Oromo protests
- 2016–2018 Ethiopian state of emergency

=== January ===
- 10 January – The Addis Ababa-Djibouti Railway is finally complete creating a high speed link with Djibouti.

=== March ===
- 11 March – At least 48 people are killed in a landslide at a landfill in the capital, Addis Ababa.

=== August ===
- 3 August – USAID expands food aid to Ethiopia as well as Kenya to help them against the famine. $137 million has been donated to Ethiopia.

== Deaths ==
- 31 July – Tesfaye Sahlu, 94, comedian, storybook author, singer (Ababa Tesfaye's Storytime).
