= Tananesh II (ferry) =

Ethiopian passenger ferry

History
- Name: Tananesh II
- Owner: Ethio Ferries
- Operator: Ethio Ferries
- Port of registry: Gorgora
- Route: Lake Tana
- Ordered: 2023
- Builder: Schottel GmbH
- Launched: 1 April 2024
- Completed: 2024
- Acquired: 2024
- Maiden voyage: 15 May 2025
- In service: 2025
- Status: Active
- Notes: Transported overland from Djibouti to Lake Tana

General characteristics
- Type: Passenger ferry
- Tonnage: 150 t (150 long tons)
- Length: 38 m (124 ft 8 in)
- Propulsion: Diesel engine
- Capacity: 188 passengers
- Notes: Designed for tourism and public transport on Lake Tana

Tananesh II is a 38-meter (124 ft 8 in)-long, 150-metric-ton (150-long-ton) passenger ferry purchased by the Ethiopian Shipping and Logistics Service Enterprise (EIH) in 2024. From April 2024, the ferry began a transnational trip from Djibouti to Ethiopia, making inland transport with its destination at Lake Tana.

== Overview and voyage ==
Tananesh II is a 38-meter (124 ft 8 in)-long, 150-metric-ton (150-long-ton) passenger ferry purchased by the Ethiopian Shipping and Logistics Service Enterprise (EIH). In April 2024, the boat arrived at Djibouti port for inland water transport, according to EIH, the vessel can carry passengers up to 180 people.

Tananesh II left Djibouti's Doraleh Port in April 2025 for inland journey in Ethiopia with its destination at Lake Tana. On 8 May 2025, the ferry arrived to Ethiopia's border and was received by Adama on 11 June. In late April and June, the boat visited across Addis Ababa.

== See also ==
- 2025 in Ethiopia
