= 2024 Sidama truck crash =

2024 lethal truck accident in Ethiopia

Sidama truck crash
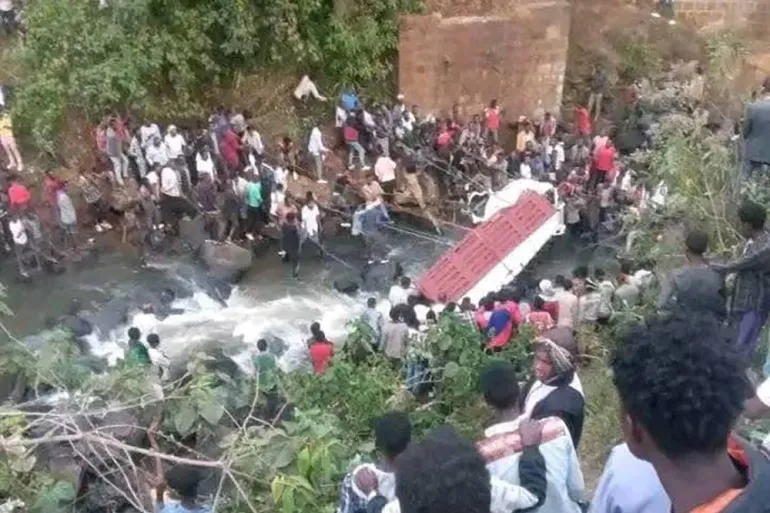

Details
- Date: 29 December 2024 c. 5:30 p.m. EAT
- Location: Bona Zuria, Sidama Region, Ethiopia
- Coordinates: 6°31′12.05″N 38°44′4.79″E
- Cause: Under investigation

Statistics
- Deaths: 71
- Injured: 4

On 29 December 2024, a truck carrying passengers lost control while crossing the Gelana Bridge in Bona Zuria, Sidama Region, Ethiopia and fell into the Ganale Doria River killing 71 people, with four survivors requiring hospital treatment.

== Background ==
With an estimated 26.7 annual road deaths per 100,000 people, road crashes are common in Ethiopia, Africa's second-most populous nation. According to the United Nations, Ethiopian roads and traffic are poorly regulated.

== Crash ==
The crash took place on the Gelana Bridge in the Eastern Zone of Sidama Region, approximately 300 kilometers (180 miles) south of Ethiopia's capital, Addis Ababa.

Initial reports from the Sidama Regional Health Bureau and zone administrator Mate Mengesha indicated that a truck carrying dozens of passengers lost control and fell into the Ganale Doria River. Sixty-eight men and three women died. He said several victims were returning from a coffee worksite and from a wedding. Four survivors were seriously injured and were treated at the Bona General Hospital, with one requiring advanced treatment and transfer to the Hawassa Referral Hospital.

== See also ==
- List of traffic collisions (2000–present)
- Sol Plaatje Dam bus crash
- Westdene dam disaster
- Transport in Ethiopia
- Road traffic accidents in Ethiopia
