= 2018 Ethiopian rally grenade attack =

Attempted assassination in Ethiopia

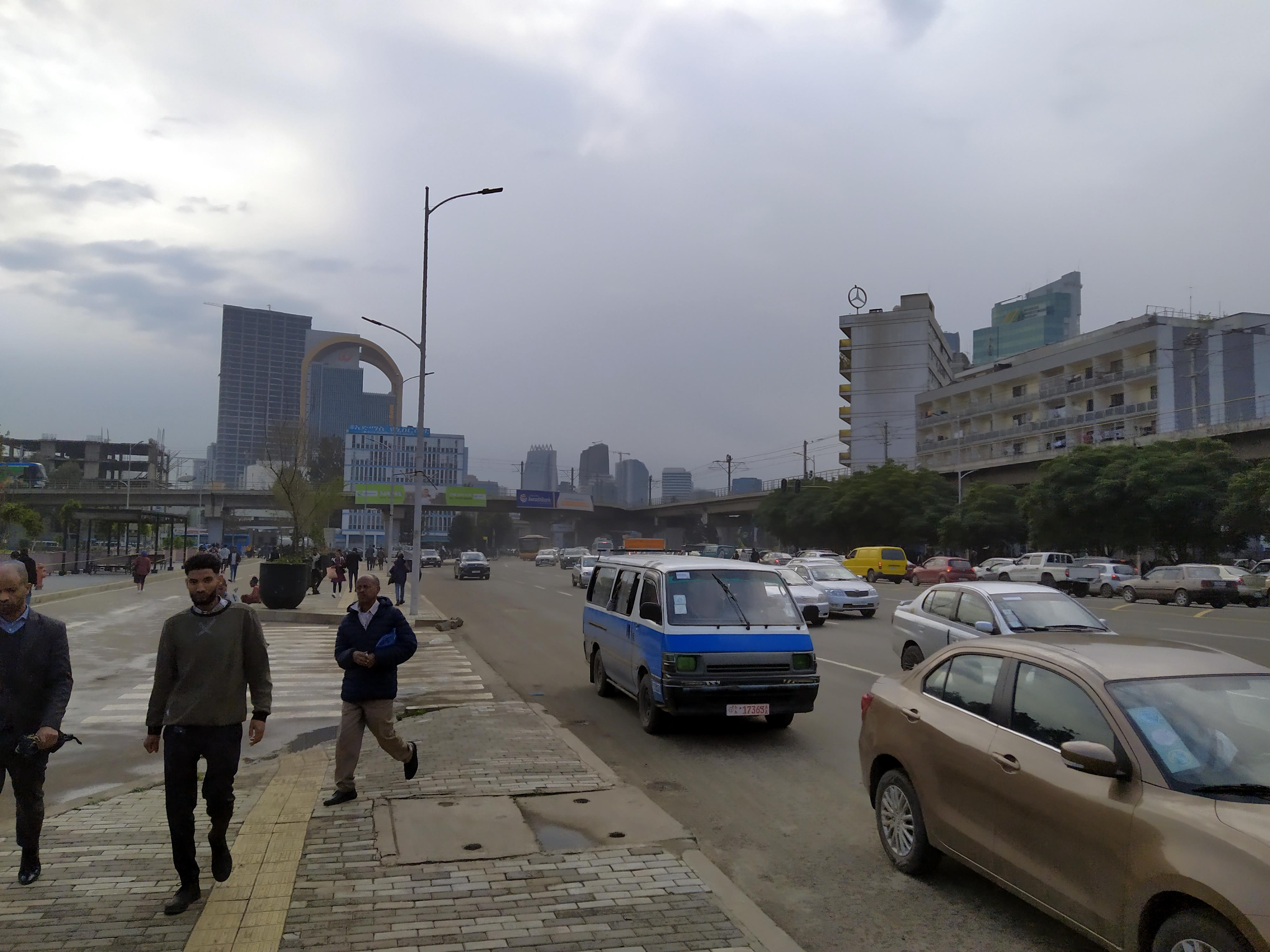
- Meskel Square in 2023
- Location: 9.0101°N 38.7614°E; Meskel Square, Addis Ababa, Ethiopia
- Date: 23 June 2018; 17:00 (EAT)
- Target: Abiy Ahmed
- Attack type: Attempt assassination
- Weapon: Grenade
- Deaths: 2
- Injuries: 44
- Motive: Unknown
- Charges: Getu Girma; Birhanu Jafar; Tilahun Getachew; Bahiru Tollosa; Desalegn Teafaye

On 23 June 2018, a large popular pro-government rally at Meskel Square for the support of political reform of Prime Minister Abiy Ahmed, was attacked by an assailant using a grenade. The grenade exploded just 17 metres away from the stage. Shortly afterwards, the assailant was taken away by security officials. The attack was the first attempted assassination of an Ethiopian national leader in modern Ethiopian history, after similar incidents during Haile Selassie and Derg era.

The attack resulted in the deaths of two people and injured 44 other people, although Ahmed was unharmed. Local media reported that the assailant wore a police uniform, and had tried to throw the grenade toward the stage where the Prime Minister and other officials were located.

In September 2018, the national prosecutors charged five suspects in the case with terrorism, connected to the Oromo Liberation Front (OLF) who sought its leadership in the country after being outlawed by the EPRDF regime.

== Event ==
An explosion of grenade has struck the large supporter of Prime Minister Abiy Ahmed in pro-government rally at Meskel Square in Addis Ababa on 23 June 2018. The explosion occurred at 17 metres away while Abiy Ahmed sat down after delivering speech on stage about his the recent political reform. After wrapping up his speech, Abiy then taken away by security personnel and other officials. Local media reported that the assailant impersonated in police uniform and tried to throw grenade on the stage after Abiy finishing his speech. Security officials believed that the attack targeted the Prime Minister and no individual or group has claimed responsibility immediately. Shortly afterwards, the area heavily filled with security presence and public transportation in the area halted as police started investigating the scene.

According to initial source, one person died from the attack and 10 others injured. However, later, the Minister of Health Amir Aman confirmed the deaths of two people and 44 were injured by the attack; the one died at Black Lion Hospital. The attack is an attempt assassination of national leader of a country. It is the first time in federal Ethiopia, although numerous attempt coups were occurred throughout its history remarkably during Haile Selassie era in 1928, 1960 and the Derg under Mengistu Haile Mariam in 1976 and 1989.

== Aftermath and reactions ==
Directly following the attack, Ahmed addressed the event on state television, describing it as an "unsuccessful attempt by forces who do not want to see Ethiopia united. The people who did this are anti-peace forces. You need to stop doing this. You weren’t successful in the past and you won’t be successful in the future". The Prime Minister Chief of Staff Fitsum Arega posted on Twitter that an unidentified assailant launched the attack at the rally. The rally organizer, Seyoum Teshome, said that "the target was the prime minister because the suspect was aiming to throw the grenade by the right side of the stage where he was sitting". Witness reported that the crowd physically attacked the assailant while injured victims taken to hospital.

On 28 September 2018, the national prosecutors charged five suspects over the incident: Getu Girma, Birhanu Jafar, Tilahun Getachew, Bahiru Tollosa, and Desalegn Teafaye. The prosecutor said the suspects did not believe Abiy would protect Oromo interests, and said they wanted the Oromo Liberation Front (OLF), which is outlawed by the national government of EPRDF regime, to assume leadership of the country. Under Abiy's reform, OLF has been removed from the country's list of "terrorist organization" and exiled members of the party have been allowed to return to their country.
