= 2024 Ethiopia–Somaliland memorandum of understanding =

Agreement that allows Ethiopia to access the Red Sea port

Ethiopia–Somaliland memorandum of understanding
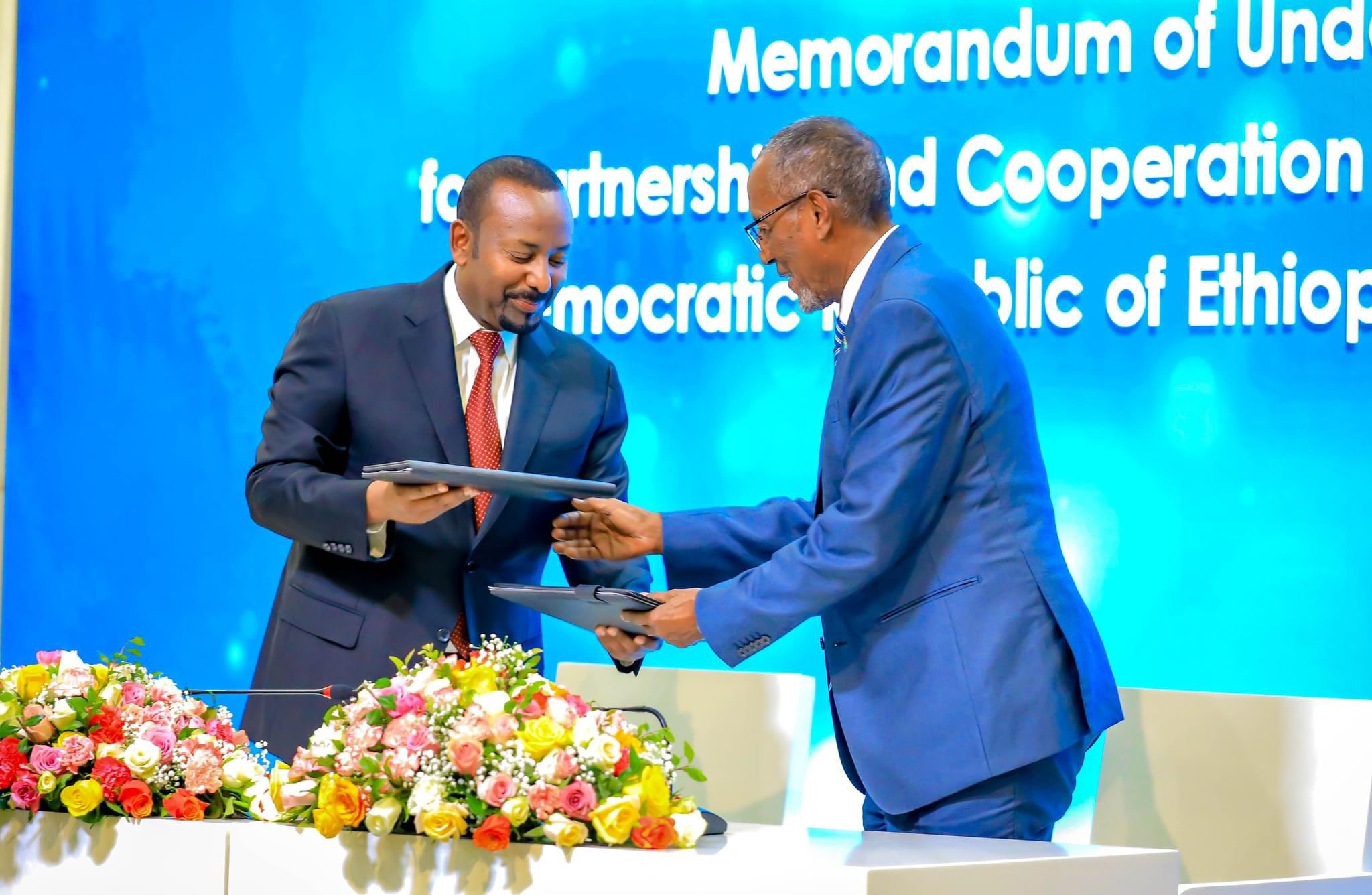
- Ethiopian Prime Minister Abiy Ahmed (left) and Somaliland President Muse Bihi Abdi exchanging the MOU after signing
- Signed: 1 January 2024
- Replaced by: Ankara Declaration
- Signatories: Abiy Ahmed (Ethiopia); Muse Bihi Abdi (Somaliland)
- Parties: Ethiopia; Somaliland

On 1 January 2024, a memorandum of understanding (MoU) was signed between Ethiopian Prime Minister Abiy Ahmed and Somaliland President Muse Bihi Abdi. Reportedly, the MoU stated that Somaliland would lease 19 kilometres (12 mi) of its Gulf of Aden coastline to Ethiopia. The agreement follows recent tensions surrounding Prime Minister Ahmed's stated desire for Ethiopia to have access to the Red Sea. In return, the MoU reportedly includes a provision stating Ethiopia would recognize Somaliland as an independent state in the future, which would at the time have made it the first UN member state to do so.

The deal has received condemnation and opposition from Somalia, Eritrea and Egypt, with Somalia recalling its ambassador to Ethiopia in protest. Somalia previously demanded Ethiopia make a public withdrawal from the MoU before the two countries could engage in any dialogue. The dispute has also put Ethiopian participation in the new African Union Support and Stabilization Mission in Somalia (AUSSOM) in question.

Following talks brokered by Turkey, on 12 December 2024, Ethiopia and Somalia signed the Ankara Declaration, agreeing to end their dispute over Ethiopia's plan to build a port in Somaliland. Notably, the agreement made no mention of the MoU, Ethiopia has not confirmed its cancellation, and Somaliland maintains the agreement stands.

== Agreement ==
On 1 January 2024, Ethiopia signed memorandum of understanding (MoU) with Somaliland in order to acquire access the Red Sea port. The text of the MoU was not released. President of Somaliland Muse Bihi Abdi stated that it included the lease of more than 19 kilometres of sea access for 50 years to the Ethiopian Navy. It was also stated that the MoU included a provision for the future recognition by Ethiopia of Somaliland as a sovereign state.

In October 2023, the Ethiopian Prime Minister Abiy Ahmed described the sea access as "an existential issue for his country", with this statement leading to concerns that this implied seizing land from neighboring Eritrea. A similar 2018 deal which would have given Ethiopia a 19% stake in the port of Berbera, alongside a 51% stake going to Emirati logistics company DP World holding a 51% share, was abandoned in 2022.

Abdi said the agreement would lead Ethiopia to set "a precedent as the first nation to extend international recognition to our country". Ethiopian politician Redwan Hussein stated that the MoU also included Somaliland taking a stake in Ethiopian Airlines. The MoU is not a legally binding agreement, which would require ratification by both parties.

== Reactions ==
The Cabinet of Somalia held an emergency meeting on 2 January following the announcement of the MoU. Somali President Hassan Sheikh Mohamud expressed his firm opposition to the agreement, saying Somaliland is part of Somalia under its constitution and the deal was conducted without legal basis with disdaining the rule of the UN, AU, and IGAD. He also added "Somaliland, you are the northern regions of Somalia and Ethiopia has no recognition for you. If Ethiopia claimed it gave you recognition, then it is not a recognition that exists."

On 3 January, Egyptian President Abdel Fattah el-Sisi held a telephone call with the Somali president, stating "Egypt will maintain a firm position alongside Somalia and support its security and stability". Mogadishu recalled its ambassador to Ethiopia. Somaliland Interior Minister Mohamed Kahin told reporters on 2 January that "We ask Somalia to apologize for its claim that Somaliland is part of Somalia"

At a press conference on 11 January, Ministry of Foreign Affairs of China spokesperson Mao Ning stated that China "supports countries in safeguarding sovereignty and territorial integrity" and that "Somaliland is part of Somalia." She also said that issue must be handled through diplomatic dialogue and "achieve common development by having friendly cooperation."

In the wake of agreement on 3 January, the Mogadishu administration organized a rally to express opposition to the deal. Many Somali protestors chanted and held banners to express their uncertainty of the lease agreement that perceived to endanger Somalia's territory. In the rally, Somalia's Interior Minister Ahmed Moallim Fiqi attended to the scene who said to protestors, "the federal government finds it unacceptable that we're ignored by an Ethiopian prime minister who belittles our federal government's role by delegitimizing it. That's a violation and unacceptable."

On 11 December 2024, Ethiopia and Somalia agreed to end their dispute over Ethiopia's plan to build a port in Somaliland, following talks brokered by Turkey. The agreement involves both countries respecting each other's sovereignty and working towards mutually beneficial commercial arrangements for Ethiopia to access the sea "under Somalia's sovereignty."

== See also ==
- 2024 in Ethiopia
- 2024 in Somaliland
