= Asmara rocket attacks =

Rocket attacks in Asmara, Eritrea as part of 2020 Tigray conflict

- Part of the Tigray war
- Location: Asmara, Eritrea
- Date: 14 November 2020, 27-28 November 2020
- Target: Asmara International Airport
- Attack type: Rocket attack
- Weapon: PHL-03 MLRS
- Perpetrator: Tigray People's Liberation Front

The Tigray People's Liberation Front fired rockets at Asmara (Eritrea) on 14 and 27 November 2020 during the Tigray War.

== 12–13 November ==
According to Mesfin Hagos, former Eritrean Minister of Defence and ardent opposition leader against the Eritrean government, during 12 and 13 November, 30 military flights carrying "thousands" of federal Ethiopian soldiers arrived in Asmara, the capital city of Eritrea. Mesfin interpreted the flights as a part of Eritrean–Ethiopian military cooperation in the Tigray War that preceded the 14 November rocket attacks.

== 14 November ==
On 14 November 2020, multiple rockets launched from Ethiopia hit Asmara. Two rockets hit Asmara International Airport.

The same day the Eritrean government confirmed that missiles were launched at the capital but denied the city had been hit, saying that they landed in the countryside. The attack came just hours after the Tigray People's Liberation Front (TPLF) threatened to target Eritrea.

The U.S. Assistant Secretary of State for Africa Tibor Nagy condemned the TPLF for the rocket attacks calling them "unjustifiable attacks against Eritrea ... its efforts to internationalize the conflict in Tigray." The Secretary of State of the United States Mike Pompeo blasted the TPLF for the attack, calling on it and Government of Ethiopia to de-escalate.

== 27 November ==
The TPLF again fired rockets at Eritrea on 27 November, numbering four according to the media, though the group did not claim responsibility. Eritrean Press stated that they landed near Asmara as well as surrounding towns. One diplomat stated that there were reports of one landing to the south of Asmara. Another diplomat said that one of them struck a neighbourhood of Asmara but this couldn't be confirmed. No casualties were reported in the attack.

Six explosions in Asmara during the night of 28 November were reported by United States State Department, although the reason was not immediately clear. Diplomats based in Addis Ababa told Agence France-Presse that the explosions were caused by rockets, which apparently struck the Asmara International Airport and Eritrean military facilities.
