= 2024 Commercial Bank of Ethiopia glitch incident =

Financial glitch in Ethiopian bank

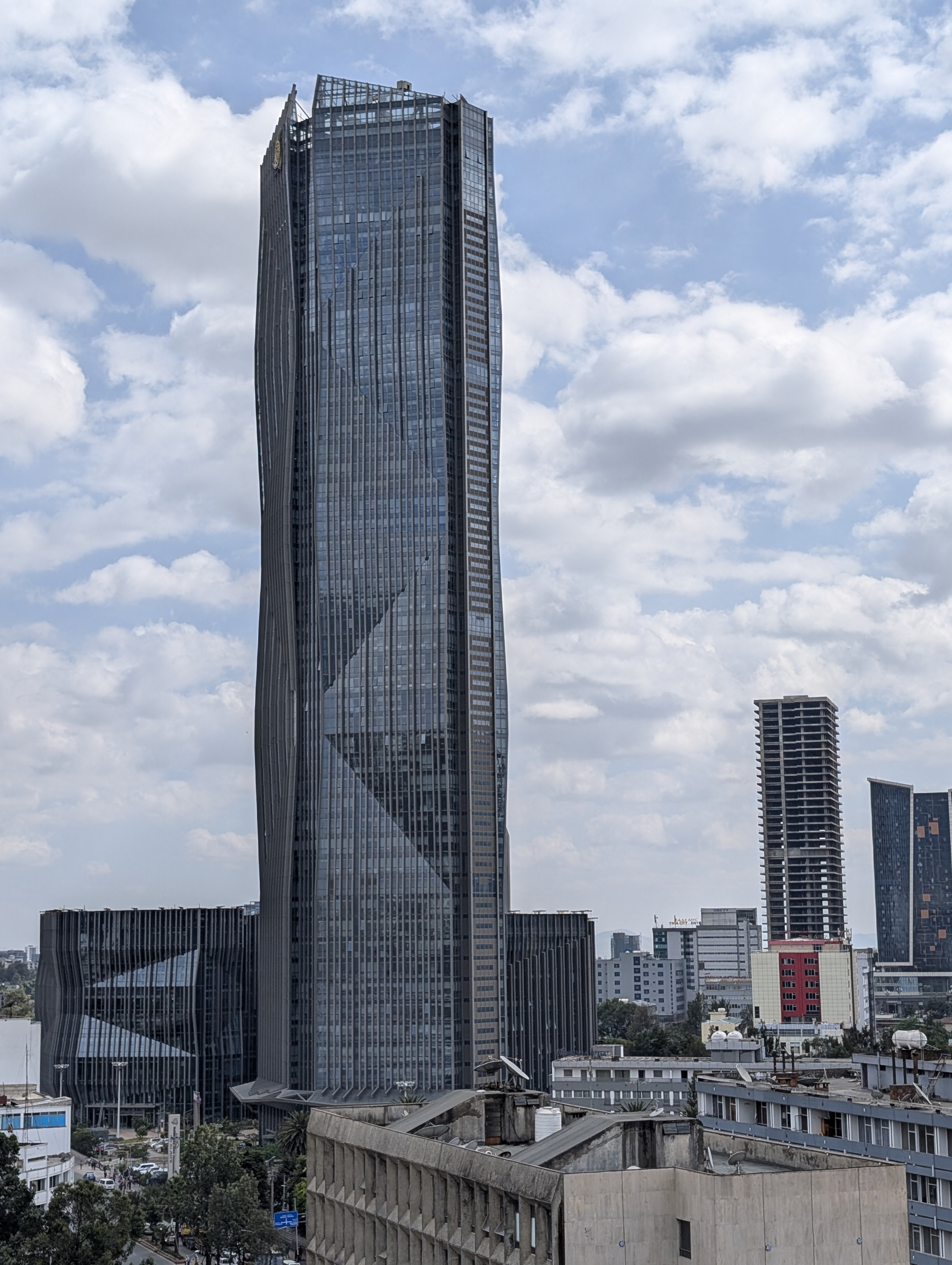
- Commercial Bank of Ethiopia Headquarters
- Date: 15 March 2024
- Duration: 12 a.m. – 3 a.m (local time)
- Type: Data breach; Systematic glitch
- Cause: Under investigation
- Outcome: CBE asked customers to return $8 million; CBE announced about one-half of $4 million recovered as of 26 March

On 15 March 2024, the Commercial Bank of Ethiopia (CBE) reported having glitching issues between 12 a.m. and 3 a.m. Customers were able to withdraw large amounts of cash (more than 8 million dollars) not deposited in their accounts, and were able to make unlimited ATM withdrawals. After circulated in social media, CBE released five notes within less than 24 hours, explaining the systematic failure in its branch services.

CBE President Abe Sano warned customers to return money saying "those who do not return money that is not theirs will be prosecuted". On 26 March, CBE announced that about $14 million recovered.

== Incident ==
On 15 March 2024, the Commercial Bank of Ethiopia (CBE) encounter systemic glitch that occurred between 12 a.m. and 3 a.m in local time. CBE released five notes within less than 24 hours, describing the bank failure as a systemic problem in its branch level. CBE President Abe Sano said that much of the money was withdrawn by students. News of the glitch spread across the local university via messaging apps and phone calls. According to BBC Amharic, students who withdrew money in western Ethiopia queued to access ATM machines after which police officers approached the campus. A Dilla University student said a number of his peers withdrew money from CBE between midnight and 02:00 local time. CBE stated that the glitch was caused by economic and political issues, believing the withdrawal of large amounts of money from ATM machines was a systemic problem. About 490,000 transactions (both legal and illegal) were completed from around midnight to dawn. Freezing transactions took hours. During an interview with BBC's Newsday programme on 20 March, President Abe warned customers to return the money that they had withdrawn, saying "those who do not return money that is not theirs will be prosecuted".

== Reactions ==
On 16 March, the National Bank of Ethiopia (NBE) issued a statement on the incident that reads:

Banks regularly carry out security checks and make updates on their systems to deliver speedy and secure services. The changes that result from these updates and inspection works may cause interruption on banking services.

NBE claimed that the interruption of service was largely due to maintenance work. Elias Meseret, an AP journalist, acknowledged those who committed the financial breach by saying: "Many people, especially university students have taken money from the commercial bank of Ethiopia ATP or have transferred money online." On 26 March, the bank said it had recovered about one-half of $4 million.
