= Food aid dependency in Ethiopia =

Long term aid to those in need creates a fear of having those provided with aid falling into the dependency theory. The rationale is that those who are benefiting will lose motivation to improve their lives on their own. Some may even work to worsen their condition in order to qualify for the aid. Additionally, one argument is that peripheral countries, such as Ethiopia, will not move out of needing aid because of the advanced economy's control. On average, Ethiopia has received 700,000 tons of food aid per year for the past 15 years. In rural Ethiopia, food aid has been provided for over three decades.

== Causes ==
=== Climate ===
Food insecurity is caused by a number of things; drought and other extreme weather conditions, animals, diseased livestock, military conflicts, political instability – most of which affect Ethiopia. Poverty, drought, and land degradation have proved to be problems that lead to the food insecurity. Agriculture is dependent on scarce rainfall and irrigation does not help as only 2% of the land is irrigated. Since the 1960s, Ethiopia's agriculture has not performed well enough to provide. Additionally, crop's low market prices are giving farmers little to no gains. Lack of fertile land prevents farmers from growing their field size to increase yield. Nutrition, diseases, and other health issues also plague the country. 1.75 million people in Southern Ethiopia regions are facing food shortages and will continue to be with the rains being insufficient

Due to below average rainfall, large areas are expected to remain in crisis (Integrated Food Security Phase Classification - Phase 3) through 2020. In Kiremt, where rain is actually improving crop production, desert locusts have been spotted which will ruin the crops. Humanitarian assistance delivery has been delayed and irregular across the country and outlook predicts struggles with food in communities throughout Ethiopia will continue.

==== Major events ====
- 1970s attempts began to address the food scarcity but the regimes in power; Imperial and Derg, were not able to deal with the extreme droughts.
- 1999–2000 droughts caused food aid imports to spike. By 2000, 16% of the total population received food aid.
- 2002–2003 major drought that brought increased aid once more. Ethiopians affected by food scarcity rose from 4% to over 20%.
- 2006 Horn of Africa food crisis hit and worsened conditions. 4.6 million of the 13 million in need of food aid were in Ethiopia.
- 2015–2016 El Niño effects prominently seen in southern Ethiopia as communities attempt to recover.

=== Conflict ===
Intercommunal conflict has led to population displacement in the Amhara region, Benishangul-Gumuz, Oromiya, and SNNP region. The ruling coalition, the Ethiopian People's Revolutionary Democratic Front (EPRDF), contributes to unrest. They have been in power since 1991 and are becoming less unified. Disagreements between the four major parties are growing, risking further inter-ethnic violence. In addition, Ethiopia has hosted more than 900,000 refugees since June 2018. Neighboring countries of South Sudan, Somalia, and Eritrea are sources of these refugees. They are the second largest refugee home on the continent.

=== Job creation ===
The illiteracy rate is extremely high despite the rapid output of children from educational programs. With the rate they are coming out of school, job creation can not keep up. Around 50% of the population is under 18 years old which puts pressure on job creation. A further problem seen with the youth is child malnutrition as it is one of the highest in the world and contributes to more than 50% of child deaths.

== Sectors ==
=== Agricultural ===
Agriculture accounts for around 40% of GDP and 85% of the labor force. This dependency creates instability as the agriculture sector is not flourishing. There are other industries; textiles, mining, and energy – but these account for a small percentage compared to agriculture. Farmers account for 85% of the 77 million people living in rural areas while living below the international poverty line of US$1. The economy has grown quickly in the past years, yet citizens have not experienced the benefits and stay dependent on foreign aid. Ethiopia ranks 69th in the world by GDP. Like many developing countries, they are working to privatize many sectors in hopes of stimulating the economy.

== Aid ==
Ethiopia is one of the leaders in recipients of food aid in the world and the largest in Africa per capita. They are 7th largest recipient of aid among the other developing countries. At the same time, development aid is the lowest for each citizen. Food scarcity remains a challenge with almost half the population being undernourished today. Aid is currently around $1.9 billion and will need to increase to accommodate for the rising population. The Ethiopia Humanitarian Response Plan estimates that about 8.1 million people will require food assistance in 2019. Countries in Africa have been the main target of food aid for years. The top 8 accounted for 49% of food aid and were: Ethiopia, Democratic People's Republic of Korea, Yemen, Bangladesh, Kenya, Pakistan, Somalia, and Sudan. The annual Food Aid Flows Report shows the trends in global food aid which reports Ethiopia being the highest on the list.

Productive Safety Net Program (PSNP) and the Other Food Security Programs (OFSPs) were introduced in 2005 in order to help the issue. An estimated eight million people receive food aid under the PSNP. The Ethiopian government hoped this would end food aid dependency for millions with three years. Agricultural development was at the heart of the program; implementing a food-for-work deal where Ethiopians would build wells or irrigation systems in exchange for food. There were problems with this being carried out such as delays of food and poor implementation.

During drought, the US provides $91 million in aid for food and medicine. Other leading contributors are; UK, Italy, Canada, Germany, and Japan.

=== Other contributing organizations ===
- Catholic Relief Services
- Food for the Hungry
- Relief Society of Tigray and World Vision
- USAID's Office of Food for Peace (FFP)
- UN World Food Program (WFP)

Many organizations are working to prevent Ethiopia from falling into famine. Sudan, Somalia, Nigeria are all at extreme risk for being classified as in famine while Ethiopia along with Niger, Chad, Cameroon, and Eritrea face food insecurity. The worry of the dependency theory is not as high of a priority for these organizations as the immediate issues Ethiopia is facing.
