= 2024 Ethiopian foreign exchange rate policy =

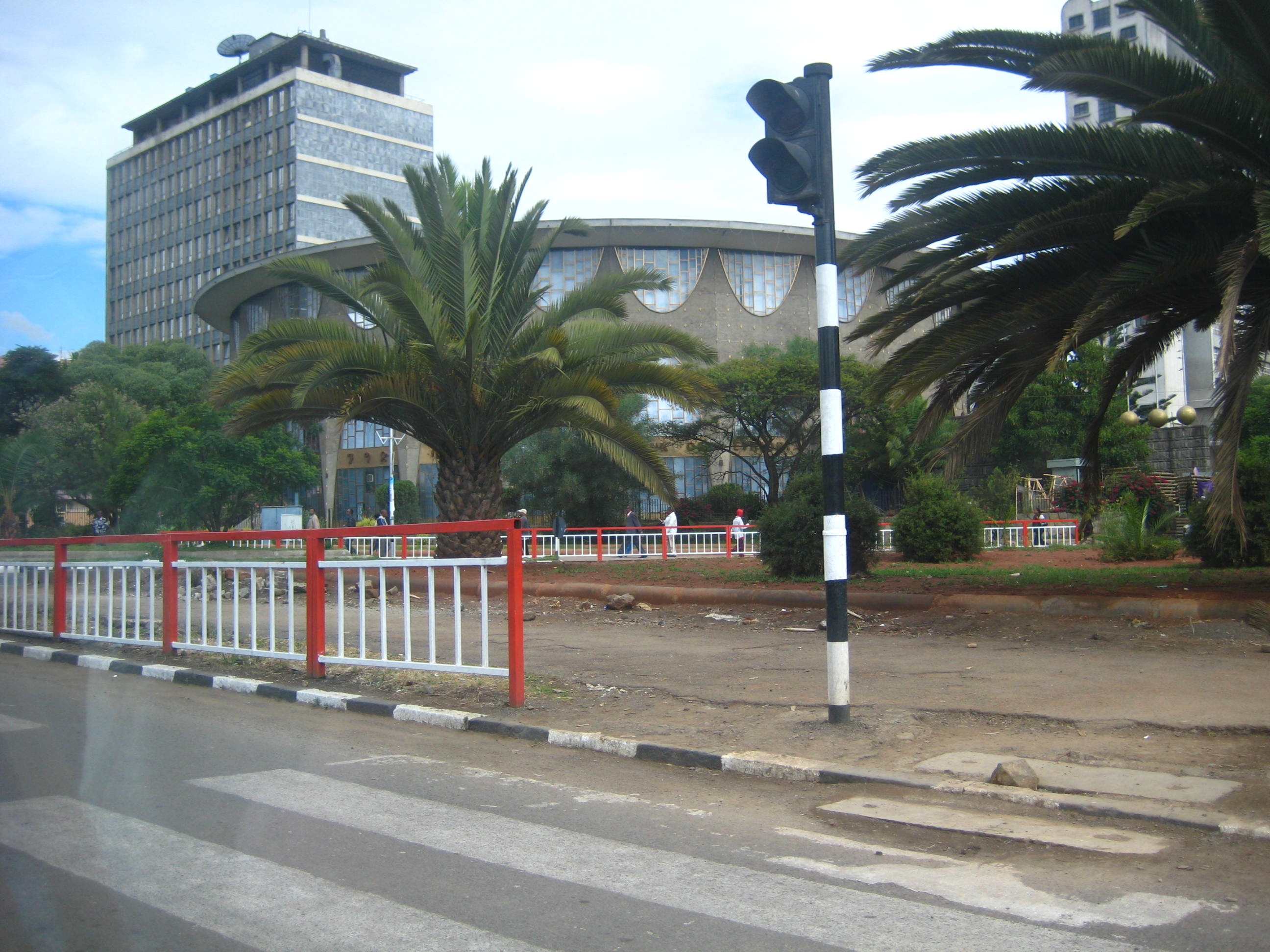
The National Bank of Ethiopia (NBE) in 2008

On 29 July 2024, the National Bank of Ethiopia (NBE) relaxed restrictions on the value of the Ethiopian birr to secure a loan of $10.7 billion from the International Monetary Fund (IMF) and World Bank. NBE announced the birr would be devalued by 30% against the US dollar to promote a market-based foreign exchange system amidst the country's foreign exchange crisis. Many Ethiopians were concerned that the policy would increase the cost of living and exacerbate inflation.

Starting on 1 August, the government ordered the closure of dozens of business entities that caused the prices of basic commodities to surge in Addis Ababa. According to the Trade Bureau of Oromia, 19 businesses closed and 16 individuals were detained.

== Background ==
Ethiopia had been grappling with a foreign exchange crisis exacerbated by persistent civil wars, resulting in a shortage of foreign currency. Under this new policy, the currency's value would be determined by the market.

The IMF urged Ethiopia to liberalize its foreign exchange market as a condition for receiving $10.7 billion in external financing.

== Event ==
Prime Minister Abiy Ahmed congratulated the government on the decision, stating that such a measure would lead Ethiopia to prosperity. On 1 August, the government ordered the shutdown of dozens of businesses due to surging prices of basic commodities in Addis Ababa. Addis Ababa City Trade Bureau spokesperson Sewnet Ayele said, "the businesses were caught making unreasonable price increases, mostly on food items. The stocks were imported before the new exchange rate." Accordingly, 71 business entities were affected. In Oromia Region, 19 businesses closed and 16 individuals were detained according to the head of the Trade Bureau of Oromia Meseret Assefa.
