= Web4Dev =

Web4Dev is the name given a series of international conferences first convened in 2003 by the World Bank. Attendees, who include UN system organizations, international development agencies, international development NGOs and, on occasion, commercial partners, use the conferences to discuss how the internet related technologies can be applied to support the Millennium Development Goals. The community is now co-ordinated by UN System Chief Executives Board Secretariat.

The sixth annual conference was held in February 2010 in Brasília, under the oversight of UNESCO.
