= Mitiku Belachew =

Ethiopian-born Belgian surgeon (1942–2021)

- Born: 11 June 1942; Ghion, Ethiopia
- Died: 7 April 2021 (aged 78)
- Occupation: Surgeon

Mitiku Belachew (Amharic: ምትኩ በላቸው; 11 June 1942 – 7 April 2021) was an Ethiopian-born Belgian surgeon. He was known for aiding in the fight against obesity.

== Biography ==
Mitiku Belachew was born on 11 June 1942 in Wonchi to a family of nine children. As a child, he experienced the death of his brother and moved to Addis Ababa at the age of twelve. There, he studied medicine, and his abilities allowed him to surpass many of his peers. He said "I was penniless, so I went with the nerve: I asked a British couple to finance my studies in exchange for housework". In 1962, he began studying at Addis Ababa University before receiving a scholarship to study medicine at the University of Liège in Belgium, although he did not speak French. He graduated in 1970.

Mitiku Belachew worked as a surgeon in Liège when an obese nurse asked him to show her how to lose weight. He had performed many "bowel short-circuit" surgeries in the past but was dissatisfied with them, saying "I stopped everything when I lost my first patient because of complications related to the lack of follow-up". He performed the first successful surgery of the sort on 1 September 1993 using a laparoscopic camera. However, he refused to file a patent on the device, saying "I don't like this mercantile side of surgery".

Mitiku Belachew died on 7 April 2021 at the age of 78.

== Awards ==
- Officer of Mérite wallon (2016)

== Publications ==
- Histoire de l’anneau modulable laparoscopique (LAGB), du rêve à la réalité (2001)
- Le berger devenu chirurgien. Des hauts plateaux d'Ethiopie aux blocs opératoires (2015), ISBN 978-2823112979, Publisher : Persée
