= Digital Ethiopia 2030 =

Five–year technology strategy for Ethiopia

- ዲጂታል ኢትዮጵያ 2030
- Abbreviation: DE2030
- Established: 20 December 2025
- Type: Digital blueprint

Digital Ethiopia 2030 (Amharic: ዲጂታል ኢትዮጵያ 2030; DE2030) is a digital blueprint by launched the Government of Ethiopia to foster technology driven growth including digital infrastructure, artificial intelligence, cybersecurity, innovation and inclusive digital services. Launched on 20 December 2025, DE2030 is five year strategy with main pillars aimed at expanding digital infrastructure to the public, thereby creates equal opportunities and accessibility to all citizens.

During the launching ceremony, Prime Minister Abiy Ahmed highlighted this digital transformation "strengthen trust between the between citizens and institutions", focusing on building capacity for the public.

== Background ==
Digital Ethiopia 2030 (DE2030) developed through national consultative process. It engages with federal and regional governments entities composed of private sector actors, academia, civil society, and development partners, also aligning with major regional and international partners such as the African Union Digital Transformation Strategy (2020–2030), AU Continental AI Strategy (2024), Africa Continental Free Trade Agreement (AfCFTA) Digital Trade Protocol, United Nations Sustainable Development Goals and Global Digital Compact and BRICS Digital Partnerships.

DE2030 is overseen by the Digital Transformation Council that is supported by government institutions including the private sector, and development partners. The initiative is funded by public resources, public-private partnerships, donor support, and domestic investment.

== Main pillars ==
Key features	Description
Inclusive technology	Delivering 90% 5G broadband network to 100 cities. Also targeted the rural community.
Digital Economy and Fintech	Mobile money, e-commerce, and digital payments to drive inclusive growth.
Innovation and Youth Skills	Digital literacy skills training, startup hubs to empower young people.
AI driven public services	AI utilization in health, education, justice, and tax services.
E-Government and Transparency	Digital platform for governance
Digital Sovereignty and Cybersecurity	Including local data, cloud infrastructure and cyber security
National ID and Interoperability	Streamline services through unified digital identity.

== Controversies ==
There have been controversies surrounding Ethiopia's AI initiatives due to their association with Jeffrey Epstein and the Epstein files. Some critics have raised concerns about the Jeffrey Epstein VI Foundation's connections to Epstein, a financier and convicted sex offender, and questioned the transparency and ethical implications of funding and supporting scientific and technological projects linked to him. These associations have led to scrutiny and skepticism from various stakeholders, who argue that such ties could undermine the credibility of Ethiopia’s AI development efforts and raise broader issues about accountability and ethical standards in international scientific collaborations.
