= Road traffic accidents in Ethiopia =

Road traffic accidents in Ethiopia are a major problem, driven by various factors and compounded by lack of management and policy on road safety. Traffic accidents continue to increase in the absence of structural national government policy involving infrastructural and legal issues. Even though the government has introduced draft strategies aimed at improving traffic efficiency and reducing road traffic accidents, major problems are escalated by pedestrians as well as drivers. Unsafe behaviors among drivers, including aggressiveness and other practices are the main contributors of traffic accident in the country.

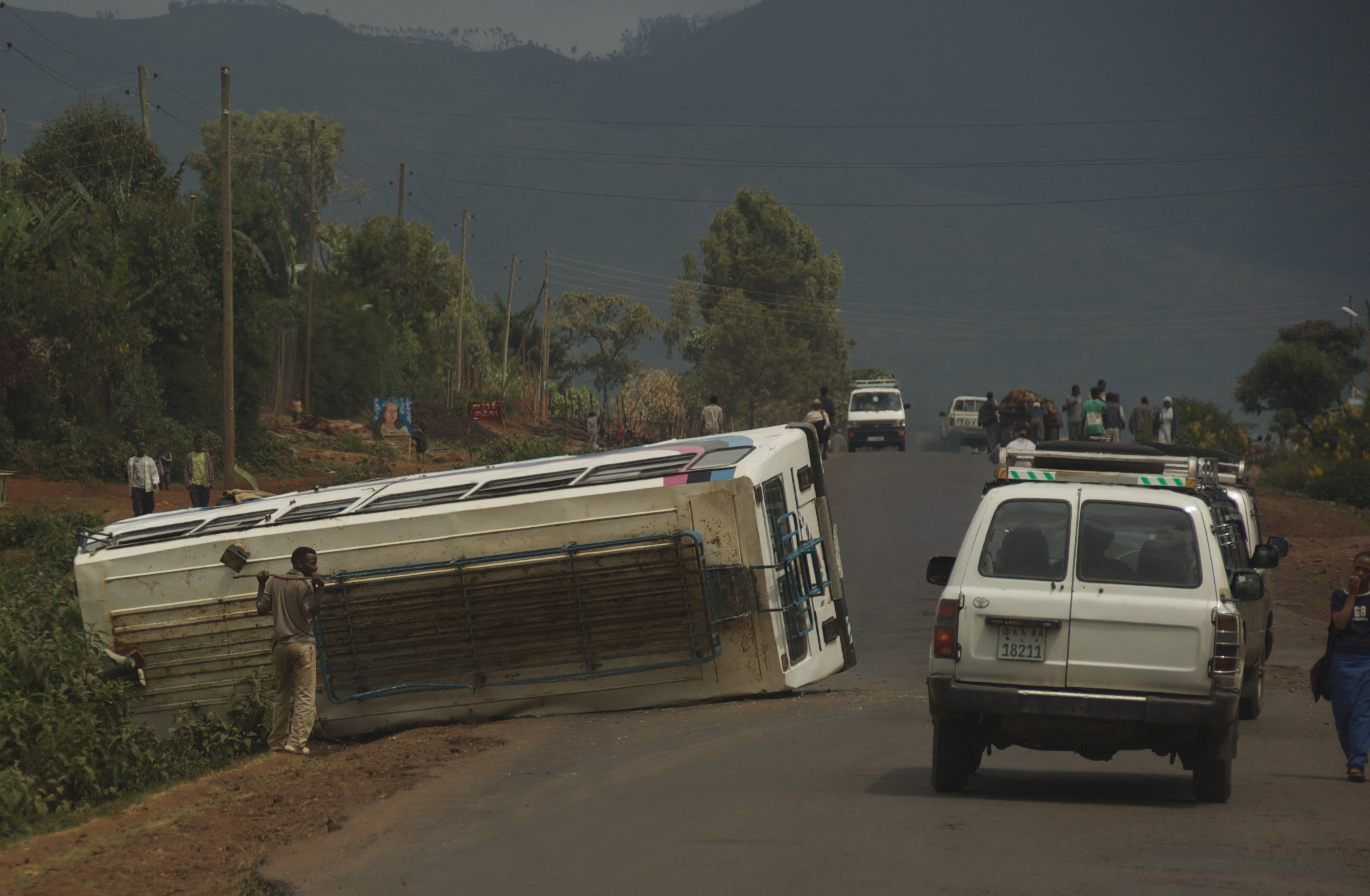
Bus flipped aside of road in 2007

In 2021, the Federal Police Commission recorded 15,034 road accidents during fiscal year starting from 7 July 2021, leaving 4,161 people dead. The World Health Organization (WHO) in 2013 reported that Ethiopia recorded the highest road traffic accident, estimated about 4,984.3 deaths per 100,000 vehicles per year.

== Prevalence ==
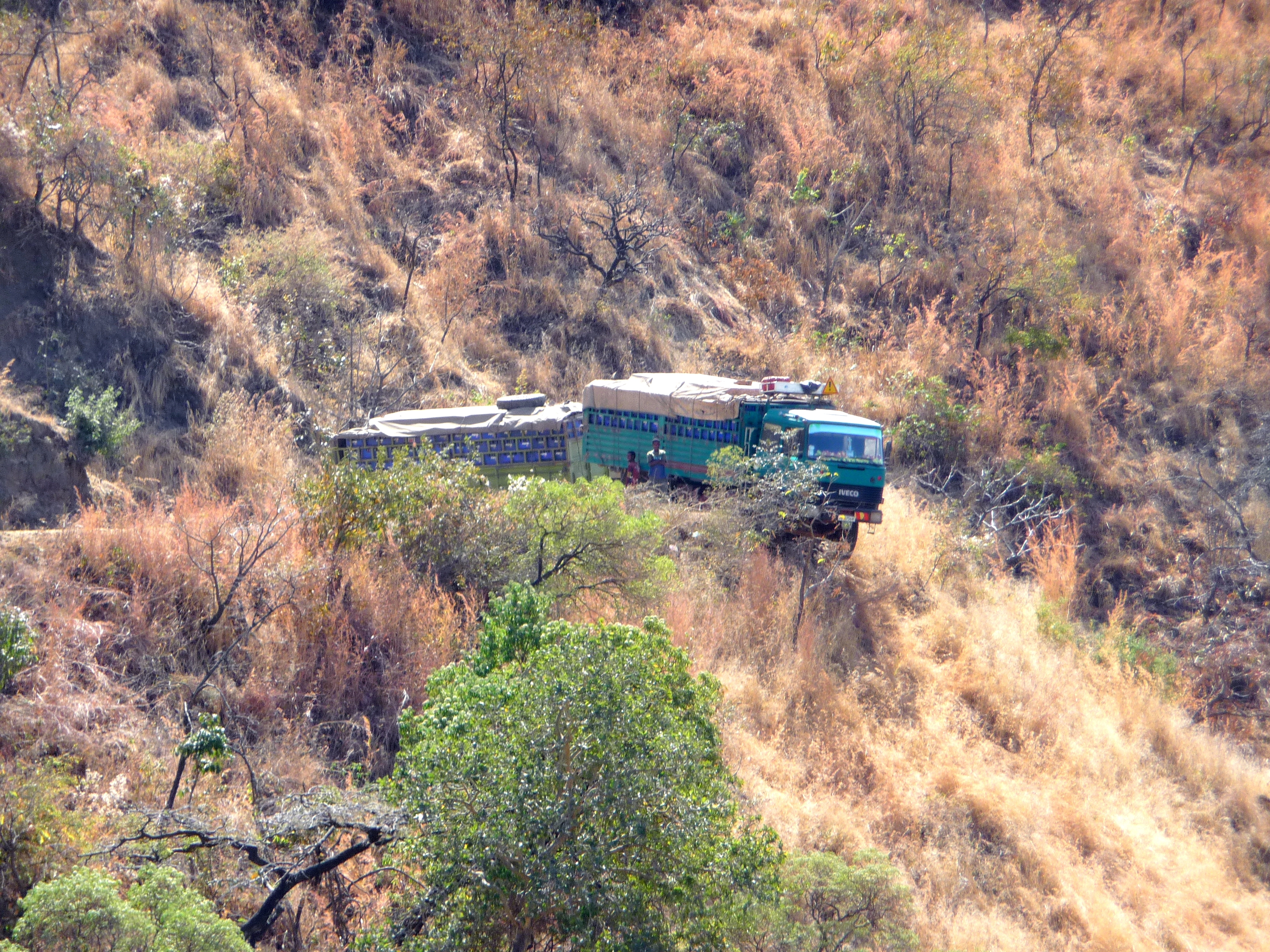
A cargo vehicle accident in rocky place in Debarq, Amhara Region, 2009

In Ethiopia, road traffic accidents are a serious problem. The Analyzing Traffic Accident research suggested that there were more than 29,1577 accidents in the past eleven years, including 912,956 kilometers road network and 68,100 motorized vehicles were developed. From 2007/2008 years to 2017/2018 years, the variation of road network coverage in kilometer and motorized vehicle were estimated around 25,914 and 563,003 respectively.

According to the Amhara Region Police Commission, almost half of 51% of car accidents occurred by freight vehicles followed by passenger vehicles which constituted 34.5% of all accidents in the region. About half of 54.8% of accidents occurred on the expressway. From April to June 2015, STEPS conducted surveys between the age of 15 and 69 using violence and injury questions by using WHO standard questionnaire. The respondents involved road traffic crash during the past 12 months, by sex, age, and place of residence as follows:

Age group (years)	Percent Involved in road traffic crashes		
Age group (years)	Men	Women	Both sexes
Age group (years)	% Involved in road traffic crashes	% Involved in road traffic crashes	% Involved in road traffic crashes
15-29	3.2	2.0	2.7
30-44	3.3	1.6	2.5
45-59	3.8	2.0	3.1
60-69	2.8	1.2	2.2
Rural	3.1	1.9	2.6
Urban	4.4	1.5	2.8
15-69	3.3	1.9	2.7

In 2021, the Federal Police Commission report issued that the country experienced 15,034 road accidents during the fiscal year that ended on 7 July 2021, leaving 4,161 people dead. The accidents left 5,763 injuries, while 5,110 others sustained minor injuries. Police also recorded 31,643 accidents that caused property damage worth more than 2.28 million birr. The World Health Organization (WHO) reported in 2013 that Ethiopia is amongst country to have the highest road accident, estimated about 4,984.3 deaths per 100,000 vehicles per year, compared to 574 across Sub-Saharan countries. In addition, the number of people who are victims of car crashes are about 30 times higher than of the United States.

As of 3 March 2021, the Federal Police Commission said some 1,848 people died from traffic accidents in Ethiopia during the first six months of the 2020–21 fiscal year starting from July 2020.

== Causes ==
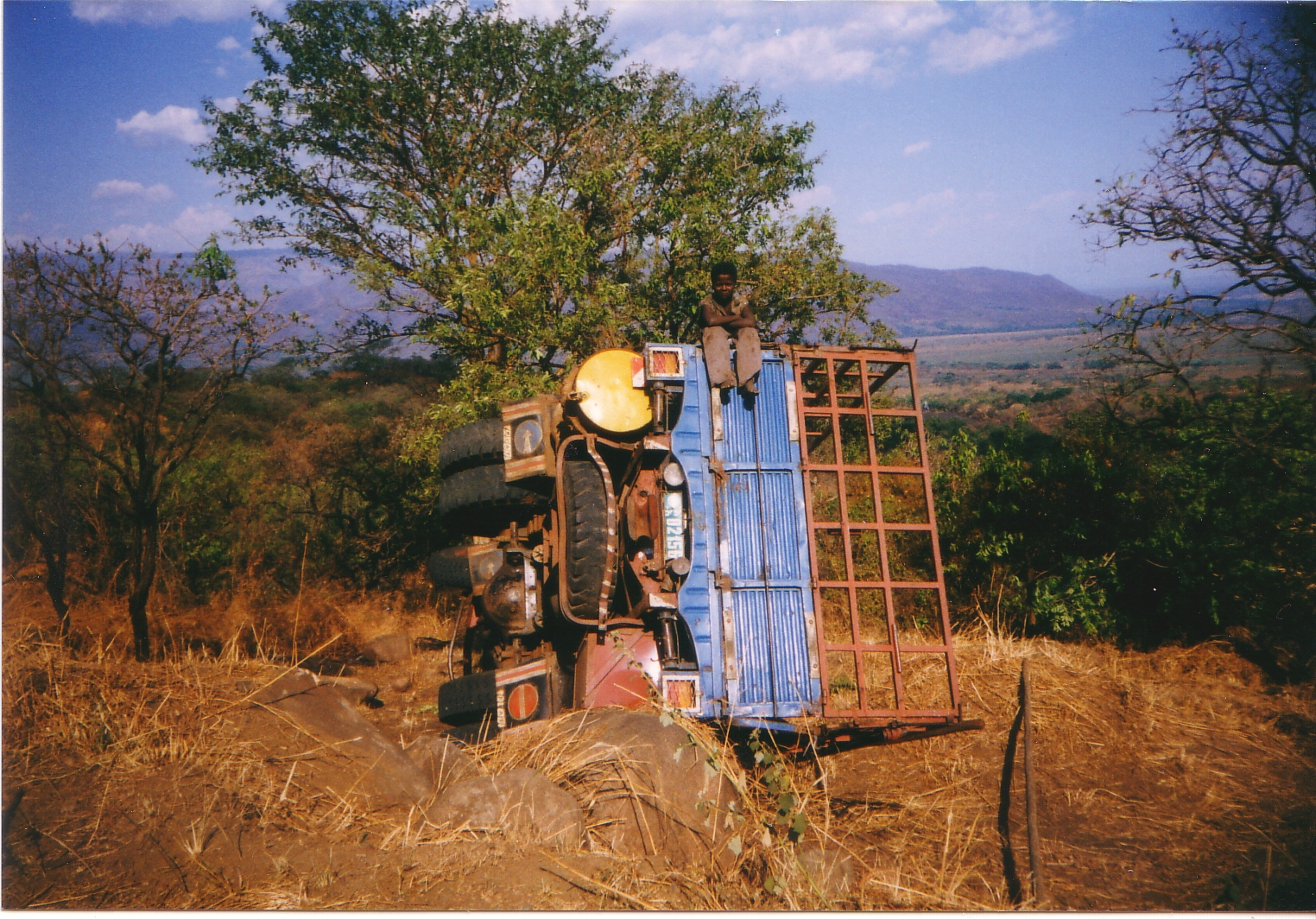
Flipped truck in Oromia in 2000

There are several factors that lead to road traffic accidents in Ethiopia, such as driver, vehicle, road, and environmental factors.

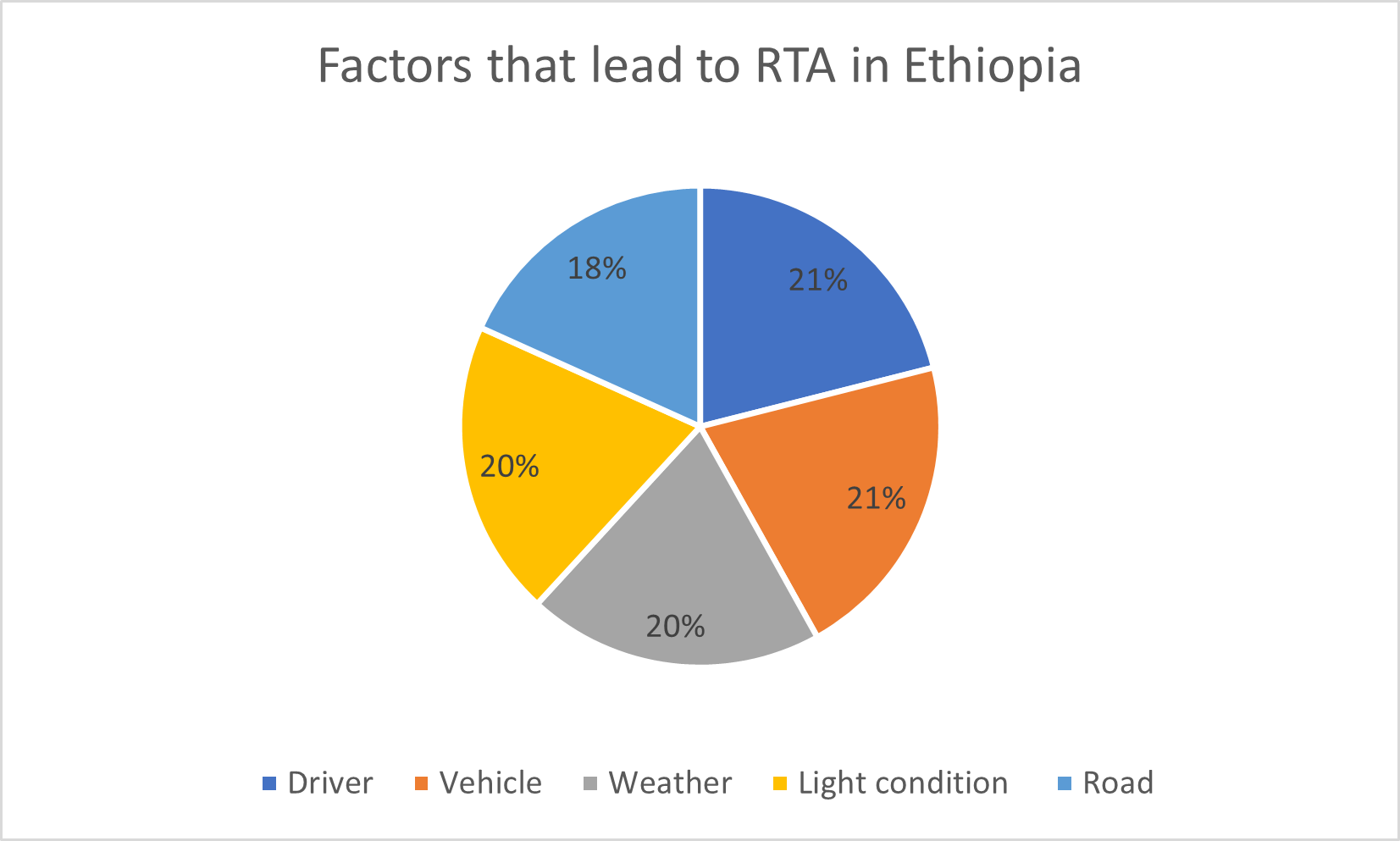
The causative factors of road traffic accident in Ethiopia

Driver factors: The major causes of Road traffic accidents in Ethiopia are driver factors such as not giving way to both vehicles and pedestrians, driving too close, not using the right side, and improper turning. From 1999 to 2013, most causes of traffic accidents were male drivers, uneducated people, experienced drivers, and vehicles that had been used for a fairly long period of time. Factors such as sleep while driving, over speeding, overloading, and drunk driving also play a big role in causing road traffic accidents. Experienced drivers with better knowledge about the characteristics of the road, safety, traffic signs, and rules tend to cause fewer traffic accidents. While drivers with low experience cause more accidents. The older one gets, the fewer accidents they are likely to cause because they are more likely to be experienced than the young. Hence, drivers who are between the ages of 18 and 30 and 31 and 50 are the ones who cause more traffic accidents than the older ones (>51). Female drivers are more responsible when driving and less likely to cause accidents than male drivers. Most male drivers are emotional and might be addicted to substances like chat. But this could also be since there are fewer female drivers than male drivers. A lack of education is also rarely underreported. In January 2018, retrospective research was conducted in Finote Selam traffic police office, and 255 records were taken from September 2009 to the date. The result showed that drivers' educational level played a crucial role in road traffic accidents such as people below 12th grade were the most contributor of fatal car accidents.

REASONS	2009	2010	2011	2012	2013	TOTAL	PERCENTAGE
Drunk driving	3	2	696	130	45	826	1.54
Not give way for vehicles	1453	1185	1515	2838	4131	24758	43.57
Not give way for pedestrians	1115	1169	1692	2159	2514	8649	15.22
Coming too close	1984	1492	1580	1843	3431	10330	18.17
Improper turning	970	644	402	564	1149	3729	6.56
Over Speeding	35	65	317	515	499	1431	2.50
Over loading	50	38	20	67	67	242	0.42
Sleep driving	-	-	49	1	15	65	0.11
No use of right side	804	605	786	710	1274	4237	7.45
Improper passing	365	295	271	881	701	2504	4.40

Vehicle factors: The vehicle factor is also another important factor that contributes to traffic accidents. The longer the service time the vehicle provides, the higher the probability of the occurrence of mechanical defects, which in turn cause traffic accidents. It is believed that vehicles used for 5 or more years cause more accidents than vehicles used for less than 5 years.

Road Factors: Roads with bad surfaces and designs are prone to causing more accidents. Theoretically, roads with bad designs (steep, crossroads, T, O, and X shapes) are considered to be causing more traffic accidents than roads with good designs (street roads), but in reality, RTA is common in street roads in Ethiopia.

Environmental factors: Environmental factors like weather and light conditions also have a great contribution to road traffic accidents. One might assume that accidents happen more in the extreme seasons, like the rainy or winter seasons, but more accidents happen during the good season. Since people are more active during these seasons, there tend to be more accidents encountered during these seasons. In general, the incidence of accidents is high during the day due to heavy traffic movement (vehicles and pedestrians), but the risk of accidents is higher during the night compared to the day due to darkness, inappropriate use of vehicle lights, and drunk driving. Crowding is another major risk factor for RTA in Ethiopia, and the common risk places are offices, market centers, churches, residential areas, and recreational areas.

Poor infrastructure and low traffic enforcement along with other factors enlisted as the major problem in Ethiopia. In the Oromia region, 14.5% of all accidents and 24% of fatalities, has high traffic movement next to Addis Ababa. Poor insurance law, emergency services, lack of safety knowledge in mixed traffic flow system and poor road network is other factors affecting the traffic. Although the country regulated road safety draft strategies, there is no national government policy in Ethiopia.

The FDRE Ministry of Transport and logistics with other stakeholders and partners has prepared a strategy based on the understanding of local context and international best practices. The strategy aims to reduce fatal road traffic injuries due to road traffic crashes by 50% in the next ten years (2021–2030) These draft strategies on road safety include.

- Legislation and enforcement
- Public Awareness/Education
- Speed Control/ rumble strips
- Road Improvement
- Mandatory motorcycle helmet
- Graduated driver license (GDL)
- Street lighting
