= Tariku Birhanu =

Ethiopian actor and director (1983–2022)

- Born: 1983; Addis Ababa, Ethiopia
- Died: 10 December 2022 (aged 38–39); Addis Ababa, Ethiopia
- Occupations: Actor; film director
- Spouses: Tariku Birhanu (m. 2016; ann. 2016) Kalkidan Tibebu (m. 2017–2022)
- Children: 1

Tariku Birhanu (Amharic: ታሪኩ ብርሃኑ; 1983 – 10 December 2022), also known by stage name Baba, was an Ethiopian film actor and director. He worked on approximately 40 films, most notably Hiwot Ena Sak, Kebad Mizan, Wondime Yakob and Ye’Arada Lij.

On 10 December 2022, Tariku died from an undisclosed illness at the age of 38. His funeral service was held at Holy Trinity Cathedral on 12 December, with many celebrities and relatives presented at the event. He was survived by his wife, the actress Kalkidan Tibebu, and a son.

== Life ==
Tariku Birhanu was born in 1983 (according to some sources) in Addis Ababa, Ethiopia. He began his acting career at an early age. Tariku participated in about 40 films, including Laundry Boy, Love and Facebook, The Engineers, Kebad Mizan, Abat Hager, Martreza, Wondime Yakob, and Ye’Arada Lij. He endorsed the campaign of Eye Bank of Ethiopia, and was involved in charitable work within the organization. Tariku married the actress Kalkidan Tibebu, with whom he had a six-year-old son. Tadias Addis journalist Seifu Fantahun confirmed that the couple had broken up their relationship, and the child lived with his mother due to Tariku's illness.

=== Death ===
On 10 December 2022, Tariku died in Addis Ababa from an undisclosed illness. On 12 December, a farewell program for Tariku was held in the Ethiopian National Theatre and funeral service was held in Holy Trinity Cathedral. Celebrities from various professions attended his funeral service.

== Legacy ==
Tariku's works contributed to many awards including Leza Awards. His last film completed production on 6 March 2023, and was produced by Eliana Film Productions. Tariku starred as the protagonist along with other co-stars including Dereje Hailu, Cherenet Fikadu, Nuhamin Meseret, and Mihiret Tadesse.
