= COVID-19 pandemic in Ethiopia =

- Disease: COVID-19
- Pathogen: SARS-CoV-2
- Location: Ethiopia
- First outbreak: Wuhan, Hubei, China
- Index case: Addis Ababa
- Arrival date: 13 March 2020 (6 years, 7 months, 2 weeks and 1 day)
- Confirmed cases: 501,339
- Active cases: 64,828
- Recovered: 356,997
- Deaths: 7,574
- Fatality rate: 1.51%
- Vaccinations: 52,489,510 (total vaccinated); 43,653,010 (fully vaccinated); 68,856,790 (doses administered)

The COVID-19 pandemic in Ethiopia was a part of the worldwide pandemic of coronavirus disease 2019 (COVID-19) caused by severe acute respiratory syndrome coronavirus 2 (SARS-CoV-2). The virus was confirmed to have reached Ethiopia on 13 March 2020. The national government, led by Prime Minister Abiy Ahmed, declared a five-month state of emergency in April 2020 but has allowed economic activities to continue during the public health crisis.

== Background ==
On 12 January 2020, the World Health Organization (WHO) confirmed that a novel coronavirus was the cause of a respiratory illness in a cluster of people in Wuhan, Hubei, China, which was reported to the WHO on 31 December 2019. The case fatality ratio for COVID-19 has been much lower than SARS of 2003, but the transmission has been significantly greater, with a significant total death toll. Model-based simulations for Ethiopia indicate that the 95% confidence interval for the time-varying reproduction number R_{t} has fluctuated around 0.8 since August 2021.

Official World Health Organization dashboard on COVID-19 in Ethiopia:

== Timeline ==
=== March 2020 ===
- On 13 March, the first coronavirus case was reported in the country and they were later identified as a Japanese citizen. The process of contact tracing is currently taking place, according to Lia Tadesse, the Health Minister of Ethiopia.
- Despite worsening situations in other countries, Ethiopia will not be enforcing a travel ban, with Tadesse stating that the virus is in 134 countries, and enforcing a travel ban will not work.
- On 15 March, three additional cases of the coronavirus were reported. The infected persons, one Ethiopian and two Japanese nationals, had contact with the individual who was reported to be infected by the virus on 13 March.
- On 16 March, a 34-year-old male Ethiopian who was said to have arrived from Dubai on 12 March 2020 tested positive for the virus.
- On 17 March, a British diplomat who arrived from Dubai tested positive for the virus.
- On 19 March, three more cases of the virus were confirmed. One is a 44-year-old Japanese national who had contact with the previously identified Japanese national. The second confirmed case is an 85-year-old Ethiopian who arrived in Ethiopia on 2 March. The third case is a 39-year-old Austrian national who arrived in Ethiopia on 15 March.
- On 22 March, two additional cases were reported. The first confirmed case is of a 28-year-old Ethiopian who had travelled to Belgium and arrived in Ethiopia on 14 March. The second case is a 34-year-old Ethiopian who had arrived from Dubai on 19 March.
- On 24 March, one additional case of the virus was reported. A 34-year-old Ethiopian who arrived from Dubai on 19 March tested positive for the virus. 15 people who are reported to have had contact with the individual are currently being monitored.
- On 27 March, four more cases of the virus were confirmed. The first case is of a 72-year-old Mauritian who had arrived from Congo Brazzaville on 14 March. The second case is of a 61-year-old individual from Adama in the Oromia Region with no prior travel history. The third case is of a 28-year-old Ethiopian national who traveled to Israel and arrived in Ethiopia on 21 March. The fourth case is a 24-year-old Ethiopian with no prior travel history. The case of this 24-year-old Ethiopian was later on announced to be a false-positive on 30 March 2020 after three follow up tests showed the patient to be negative.
- On 28 March, the Ministry of Health reported that one patient had fully recovered from the virus.
- On 29 March, five additional cases of the virus were reported. The first case is of a 28-year-old female Ethiopian who had travelled to Belgium and Cameroon on 17 and 19 March, respectively. The second and third cases are of a 14-year-old male and 48-year-old female from Adama who are members of the same family and had previous contact with an individual with the virus. The fourth and fifth cases are of a 38-year-old male and a 35-year-old female Ethiopians from Addis Ababa with both having a travel history to Dubai at different dates. One patient was also reported to have fully recovered, making the total number of recoveries two.
- On 30 March, the Prime Minister said in a statement that the total number of cases in the country had risen to 23. One of the cases was of a 32-year-old male Ethiopian who had arrived from the United States on 19 March. The second case was of a 37-year-old female Ethiopian who had arrived from United Arab Emirates on 21 March. Both individuals were from the Amhara Region.
- On 31 March, four cases of the virus were reported. The first two cases were of two male Ethiopians, 30 and 36 years old, who arrived from Dubai on 24 March. They were both placed under mandatory quarantine upon entry. The third case was of a 60-year-old female Ethiopian from Addis Ababa who arrived from France on 15 March. The fourth confirmed case is of a 42-year-old male Ethiopian from Dire Dawa who arrived from Australia on 18 March.
- By the end of the months there had been 26 confirmed cases, two recoveries and no deaths, leaving 24 active cases going into April.

=== April 2020 ===
- On 1 April, three more cases were reported. The first one is a 33-year-old female Ethiopian with a travel history to Djibouti, Brazil, India, and Congo Brazzaville. The second case is of a 26-year-old male Ethiopian with no travel history. The third case is of a 32-year-old male Ethiopian who had contact with a person with a confirmed case and was under isolation.
- On 2 April, one patient was reported to have fully recovered.
- On 3 April, six more cases of the virus were reported. Five of the cases were from Addis Ababa and two of them had travel histories to Dubai on different dates. The sixth case is a 33-year-old female Ethiopian from Dire Dawa who said to have had contact with the person who tested positive on 31 March.
- On 4 April, three additional cases of the virus were reported. All of the cases were from Addis Ababa. Two of the patients, 29-year-old and 34-year-old male Ethiopians, had travel histories to Dubai on different dates. The third case is of a 35-year-old female Ethiopian who had arrived from Sweden on 3 April. On the same date, one additional recovery was reported, increasing the total number of recoveries to 4.
- On 5 April, five more positive cases of the virus were reported. Three of them are Ethiopians. The other two are Libyan and Eritrean nationals. On the same date, the first deaths of patients from the coronavirus were reported. The first patient was a 60-year-old female Ethiopian with a travel history to France who tested positive for the virus on 31 March 2020. The second patient was a 56-year-old male Ethiopian with no travel history who was confirmed to have the virus on 3 April 2020.
- On 6 April, one case of the virus was reported. The case is of a 65-year-old female Ethiopian resident of Dukem with no travel history.
- On 7 April, eight more cases of the virus were reported. One of the infected persons is an Eritrean national and the remaining are Ethiopians. A 9-month-old baby is one of the cases, making it the youngest confirmed case so far.
- On 8 April, three cases of the virus were reported. Two of them are 29-year-old male Ethiopians with travel histories to Dubai. The other case is of a 36-year-old male Ethiopian from Addis Kidam in the Amhara region with no travel history.
- On 9 April, one case of the virus was reported. The case is of a 43-year-old Canadian with a travel history to Dubai and Canada.
- On 10 April, nine more cases of the virus were reported. Seven of them are Ethiopians and the others are Eritrean and Indian nationals. All of them had travel histories. On the same date, a death of one patient was reported. The patient was the 65-year-old woman from Dukem who tested positive for the virus on 6 April.
- On 11 April, four cases of the virus were reported. All of them are Ethiopians and three of them had travel histories. On the same date, six more recoveries were reported.
- On 12 April, two cases were reported. The first case is of a 24-year-old female Ethiopian who returned from Dubai before the mandatory quarantine rule was imposed on anyone entering the country. The second case is of a 35-year-old female Ethiopian who returned from Turkey and was under mandatory quarantine.
- On 13 April, three cases were reported. All of them are Ethiopians and had no travel histories. On the same date, four more recoveries were reported.
- On 14 April, eight more cases were reported.
- On 15 April, three cases were reported. All of them are Ethiopians. On the same date, one patient was reported to have fully recovered.
- On 16 April, seven more cases reported. All of them are Ethiopians and one of them had no travel history abroad.
- On 17 April, four cases were reported. All of them are Ethiopians. Two of them are from Addis Ababa and the other two are from the Amhara Region.
- On 18 April, nine cases were reported. Eight of them are Ethiopians and one is Equatoguinean. Of the Ethiopians, four are from Addis Ababa, three are from Dire Dawa and one is from Jimma. Three had no travel history but had known contact with someone with the virus. One person was reported to have fully recovered, bringing the total of those who have recovered to 16.
- On 19 April, three cases were reported. All of them are Ethiopians and live in Addis Ababa. One had no travel history and contact tracing is being conducted.
- On 20 April, three cases were reported. All of them are Ethiopians and live in Dire Dawa. One had no travel history but had known contact with someone with the virus.
- On 27 April, one case and nine newly recovered reported. The patient has travel history from United Kingdom and was in mandatory quarantine.
- By the end of the month there had been 105 new cases, bringing the total number of confirmed cases to 131. The death toll was 3. The number of recovered patients increased to 59, leaving 69 active cases.

=== May 2020 ===
- During May there were 1041 cases, bringing the total number of confirmed cases to 1172. The death toll rose to 11. The number of recovered patients increased to 209, leaving 952 active cases at the end of the month.

=== June 2020 ===
- In June, the government announced that it was postponing the 2020 general election due to the pandemic.
- On 11 June, the first confirmed case was reported in one of the four refugee camps in the north of the country, holding about 100,000 Eritreans living in crowded conditions.
- There were 4674 new cases in June, raising the total number of confirmed cases to 5846. The death toll rose to 103. The number of recovered patients increased to 2430, leaving 3313 active cases at the end of the month.

=== July to September 2020 ===
- On 18 July, the WHO stated that Ethiopia was one of ten African countries accounting for 88 percent of all reported COVID-19 cases in the African Region.
- In July there were 11,684 new cases, raising the total number of confirmed cases to 17,530. The death toll rose to 274. The number of recovered patients increased by 4,520 to 6,950. There were 10,306 active cases at the end of the month.
- As of 8 August, Ethiopia reported 22,253 confirmed COVID-19 cases compared to 13,248 on 25 July. The cumulative number of recoveries has reached 9,707, while the number of deaths has increased to 390.
- There were 34,601 new cases in August, raising the total number of confirmed cases to 52,131. The death toll nearly tripled to 809. There were 32,328 active cases at the end of the month.
- There were 22,453 new cases in September, raising the total number of confirmed cases to 74,584. The death toll rose to 1,191. The number of recovered patients increased to 30,952, leaving 42,441 active cases at the end of the month.

=== October to December 2020 ===
- There were 21,585 new cases in October, bringing the total number of confirmed cases to 96,169. The death toll rose to 1,469. The number of recovered patients increased to 52,517, leaving 42,183 active cases at the end of the month.
- There were 13,905 new cases in November, bringing the total number of confirmed cases to 110,074. The death toll rose to 1,706. The number of recovered patients increased to 73,808, leaving 34,560 active cases at the end of the month.
- There were 14,190 new cases in December, taking the total number of confirmed cases to 124,264. The death toll rose to 1,923. The number of recovered patients increased to 112,096, leaving 10,245 active cases at the end of the month.

=== January to March 2021 ===
- There were 13,386 new cases in January, taking the total number of confirmed cases to 137,650. The death toll rose to 2,093. The number of recovered patients increased to 122,862, leaving 12,695 active cases at the end of the month.
- There were 21,422 new cases in February, taking the total number of confirmed cases to 159,072. The death toll rose to 2,365. The number of recovered patients increased to 134,858, leaving 21,849 active cases at the end of the month.
- Vaccinations started on 13 March, initially with 2.2 million doses of the Oxford-AstraZeneca COVID-19 vaccine obtained through COVAX on 7 March. There were 47,517 new cases in March, taking the total number of confirmed cases to 206,589. The death toll rose to 2,865. The number of recovered patients increased to 158,109, leaving 45,613 active cases at the end of the month.

=== April to June 2021 ===
- There were 51,473 new cases in April, taking the total number of confirmed cases to 258,062. The death toll rose to 3,709. The number of recovered patients increased to 200,148, leaving 54,205 active cases at the end of the month.
- There were 13,479 new cases in May, taking the total number of confirmed cases to 271,541. The death toll rose to 4,165. The number of recovered patients increased to 238,734, leaving 28,642 active cases at the end of the month.
- There were 4,633 new cases in June, taking the total number of confirmed cases to 276,174. The death toll rose to 4,320. The number of recovered patients increased to 260,372, leaving 12,040 active cases at the end of the month. In June, the number of vaccine doses administered grew from 1,822,343 to 2,019,163.

=== July to September 2021 ===
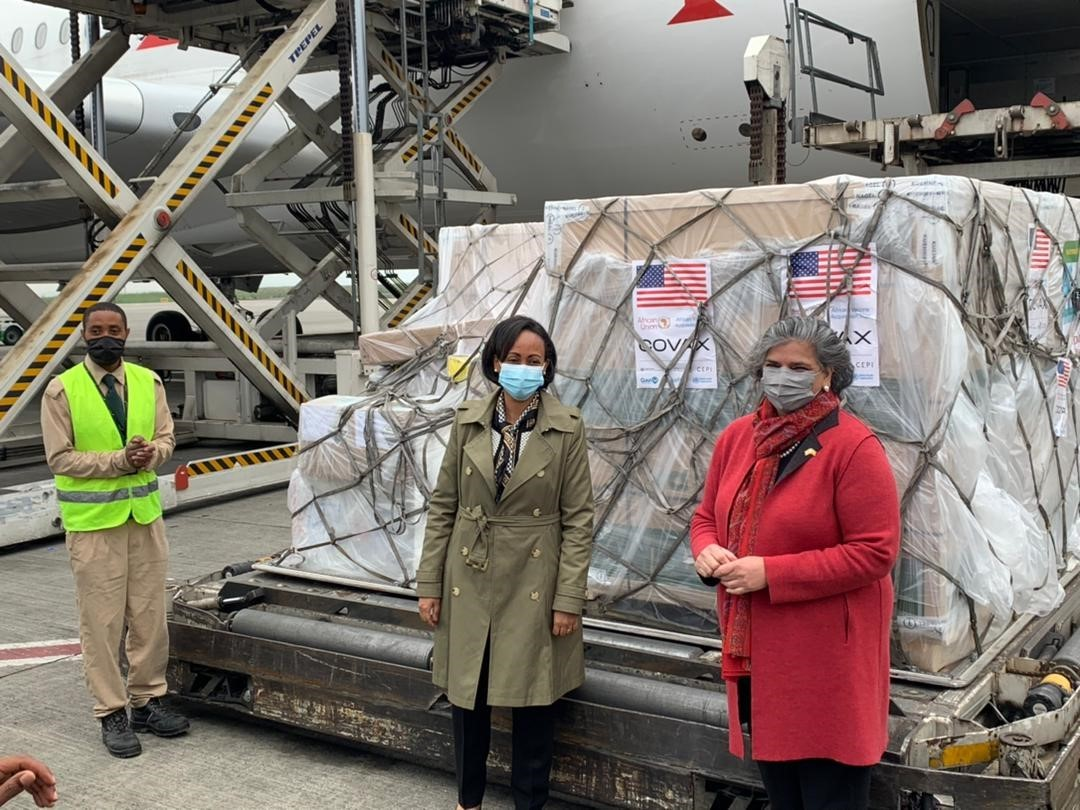
The US delivers Janssen COVID-19 vaccines to Ethiopia as part of the COVAX initiative in 2021

- There were 4,191 new cases in July, taking the total number of confirmed cases to 280,365. The death toll rose to 4,385. The number of recovered patients increased to 263,500, leaving 12,478 active cases at the end of the month. In July, the number of vaccine doses administered grew from 2,019,163 to 2,217,097.
- There were 27,769 new cases in August, raising the total number of confirmed cases to 308,134. The death toll rose to 4,675. The number of recovered patients increased to 276,842, leaving 26,615 active cases at the end of the month. In August, the number of vaccine doses administered grew from 2,217,097 to 2,451,950.
- There were 37,540 new cases in September, raising the total number of confirmed cases to 345,674. The death toll rose to 5,582. The number of recovered patients increased to 312,806, leaving 27,284 active cases at the end of the month. In September, the number of vaccine doses administered grew from 2,451,950 to 2,853,785.

=== October to December 2021 ===
- There were 19,493 new cases in October, raising the total number of confirmed cases to 365,167. The death toll rose to 6,459. The number of recovered patients increased to 339,742, leaving 18,966 active cases at the end of the month.
- There were 25,862 new cases in November, raising the total number of confirmed cases to 371,536. The death toll rose to 6,755. The number of recovered patients increased to 349,037, leaving 15,742 active cases at the end of the month. In November, the number of vaccine doses administered grew from 3.6 million to 7.9 million.
- There were 48,806 new cases in December, raising the total number of confirmed cases to 420,342. The death toll rose to 6,937. The number of recovered patients increased to 355,046, leaving 58,357 active cases at the end of the month. In December, the number of vaccine doses administered grew from 7.9 million to 9.3 million. Modelling by WHO's Regional Office for Africa suggests that due to under-reporting, the true cumulative number of infections by the end of 2021 was around 52 million while the true number of COVID-19 deaths was around 34,734.

=== January to March 2022 ===
- There were 44,588 new cases in January, raising the total number of confirmed cases to 464,930. The death toll rose to 7,331. The number of recovered patients increased to 397,786, leaving 59,813 active cases at the end of the month.
- There were 3,744 new cases in February, bringing the total number of confirmed cases to 468,674. The death toll rose to 7,460. The number of recovered patients increased to 416,704, leaving 44,510 active cases at the end of the month.
- There were 759 new cases in March, bringing the total number of confirmed cases to 469,433. The death toll rose to 7,497. The number of recovered patients increased to 442,826, leaving 19,433 active cases at the end of the month.

=== April to June 2022 ===
- There were 1,148 new cases in April, bringing the total number of confirmed cases to 470,581. The death toll rose to 7,510. The number of recovered patients increased to 455,383, leaving 7,688 active cases at the end of the month.
- There were 1,765 new cases in May, bringing the total number of confirmed cases to 472,346. The death toll rose to 7,513.
- There were 16,378 new cases in June, bringing the total number of confirmed cases to 488,724. The death toll rose to 7,536. The number of recovered patients increased to 461,705, leaving 19,481 active cases at the end of the month.

=== July to September 2022 ===
- There were 3,513 new cases in July, bringing the total number of confirmed cases to 492,237. The death toll rose to 7,568. The number of recovered patients increased to 469,696, leaving 14,973 active cases at the end of the month.
- There were 953 new cases in August, bringing the total number of confirmed cases to 493,190. The death toll rose to 7,572. The number of recovered patients increased to 471,643, leaving 13,975 active cases at the end of the month.
- There were 397 new cases in September, bringing the total number of confirmed cases to 493,587. The death toll remained unchanged. The number of recovered patients increased to 471,930, leaving 14,085 active cases at the end of the month.

=== October to December 2022 ===
- There were 373 new cases in October, bringing the total number of confirmed cases to 493,960. The death toll remained unchanged. The number of recovered patients increased to 472,098, leaving 14,290 active cases at the end of the month.
- There were 618 new cases in November, bringing the total number of confirmed cases to 494,578. The death toll remained unchanged. The number of recovered patients increased to 472,443, leaving 14,563 active cases at the end of the month.
- There were 3,423 new cases in December, bringing the total number of confirmed cases to 498,001. The death toll remained unchanged. The number of recovered patients increased to 479,993, leaving 10,436 active cases at the end of the month.

=== January to December 2023 ===
Chart showing the number of COVID-19 cases in Ethiopia (March 2020 to April 2023)

- There were 3,206 new cases in 2023, bringing the total number of confirmed cases to 501,207. The death toll rose to 7,574. The number of recovered patients increased to 488,159, leaving 5,474 active cases at the end of the month.

== Reactions ==
On 16 March 2020, the office of the Prime Minister announced that schools, sporting events, and public gatherings shall be suspended for 15 days.

On 20 March 2020, Ethiopian Airlines suspended flights to 30 countries affected with the coronavirus. On the same date it was announced that anyone entering the country should undergo a mandatory self-quarantine for 14 days. Night clubs in Addis Ababa are also to remain closed until further notice.

On 23 March 2020, Ethiopia closed all land borders and deployed security forces to halt the movement of people along the borders.

On 25 March 2020, 4,011 prisoners were granted pardon by the Ethiopian President Sahle-Work Zewde in an effort to prevent the coronavirus spread. The pardon applies only to prisoners convicted of minor crimes who are serving sentences of up to three years and those who are about to be released.

On 29 March 2020, Ethiopian Airlines suspended flights to more than 80 countries.

On 2 April 2020, the Federal Attorney General granted pardon for 1,559 prisoners.

On 8 April 2020, the Council of Ministers declared a five-month long state of emergency in response to the growing number of coronavirus cases. The state of emergency was approved on 10 April by the parliament.

=== Regional governments ===
After multiple cases of the virus were reported, several regions of the country took measures to prevent further spread of the virus. Travel restrictions and lock downs were imposed by Amhara, Oromia, Tigray, Southern Nations, Nationalities, and Peoples' Region, Benishangul Gumuz, Afar, Somali, Gambela regions.

==== Amhara ====
On 25 March 2020, the Amhara regional government ordered civil servants that are at high risk to work from home.

On 29 March 2020, a ban on all incoming public transportation vehicles were ordered.

On 30 March 2020, it was announced that anyone who returned from abroad in the previous three weeks should report to the local health offices.

On 31 March 2020, a 14-day total lockdown of Bahir Dar and three other towns was imposed.

==== Oromia ====
A CDC-sponsored poster on COVID-19 standard precaution and transmission prevention in Oromia.

On 29 March 2020, city of Adama in Oromia ordered a complete ban on public transportation systems. The order came after two people tested positive for the virus in the city. The town of Asella and Metu also took measures banning movement of all public transportation to and from the city.

On 30 March 2020, a complete ban on cross-country and inter-city public transportation was imposed.

On 7 April 2020, the regional state released 13,231 prisoners.

==== Tigray ====
On 26 March 2020, Tigray Region declared a 15-day region-wide state of emergency, banning all travel and public activities within the region to prevent the spread of the virus.

On 29 March 2020, closure of all cafes and restaurants were ordered. The measures taken also include banning landlords from evicting tenants or increasing rent. Any travelers entering the state are also required to report to the nearest health office.

On 6 April 2020, the regional state released 1,601 prisoners.

Information on management of the COVID-19 pandemic became difficult to obtain during the Tigray War that started in November 2020. Looting of the means of survival and the military fighting itself led to emergency conditions of acute food insecurity and difficulties in prioritising anti-pandemic measures. As of January 2021, only five out of 40 hospitals were "physically accessible" and most hospitals outside of the Tigrayan capital Mekelle had been looted or destroyed. An OCHA report suggested that "massive community transmission of the pandemic" could have started taking place in Tigray Region, with big movements of people as a contributing factor.

== Impact ==
=== Economic ===
The United Nations Economic Commission for Africa estimated that COVID-19 will shave 2.9 percentage points off of Ethiopia's economic growth for fiscal year 2020.

The pandemic has affected Ethiopia's flower export industry significantly. After Europe was hit with the coronavirus, the demand for flowers has plummeted and the price dropped by more than 80%. A total of 150,000 employees in this industry are also at the risk of losing their jobs.

Ethiopian Airlines, the country's flag carrier, reported that it is working at only 10% of its capacity because of the COVID-19 pandemic. The CEO, Tewolde Gebremariam, reported a loss of $550 million in the months of January to April 2020.

=== Educational ===
More than 26 million students are affected by school closures due to the coronavirus. Consequently, school feeding programmes for around 1 million children across multiple regions of the country have stopped.

=== Political ===
The general elections which were set to be held on 29 August 2020 won't be held on the scheduled date, according to a statement by the National Electoral Board of Ethiopia released on 31 March. The board also stated that it has temporarily ceased all activities related to the election.

Some people have been arrested for allegedly spreading false information about the COVID-19 pandemic.

== Statistics ==
=== Total number of confirmed cases ===
View source data.

=== Confirmed new cases per day ===
View source data.

=== Confirmed deaths per day ===
View source data.

== See also ==
- COVID-19 pandemic in Africa
- COVID-19 pandemic by country and territory
- 2020 in Ethiopia
