= Ankara Declaration =

Peace treaty signed in Ankara, Turkey

Ankara Declaration by the Federal Democratic Republic of Ethiopia and the Federal Republic of Somalia facilitiated by the Republic of Türkiye
- Signed: December 12, 2024
- Location: Ankara, Turkey
- Mediators: Turkey
- Parties: Ethiopia; Somalia
- Citations: English version
- Languages: Amharic, English, Somali and Turkish

On 12 December 2024, Ethiopia and Somalia signed a joint declaration in Ankara, Turkey to restore their bilateral relations following a tension over the sovereignty status of Somaliland and Ethiopia's access to Red Sea port.

The joint of declaration was announced by Turkish President Recep Tayyip Erdoğan, who thanked both countries' leaders: Somali President Hassan Sheikh Mohamud and Ethiopian Prime Minister Abiy Ahmed for their “historic reconciliation”. On 15 January 2025, Somalia's president Sheikh Mohamud made a surprise visit to Ethiopia to deal with their diplomatic tensions. The talk with Ethiopian officials resulted in the jubilation of their diplomatic relations.

== Agreement ==
On 12 December 2024, Ethiopia and Somalia signed a joint declaration in Ankara, Turkey, to resolve the disputed sovereignty over Somaliland and Ethiopia's access to the Port of the Red Sea. The joint declaration was announced by Turkish President Recep Tayyip Erdoğan, who thanked both countries' leaders: Somali President Hassan Sheikh Mohamud and Ethiopian Prime Minister Abiy Ahmed for their "historic reconciliation".

On 15 January 2025, Somali President Hassan Sheikh Mohamud made a surprise visit to Ethiopia to deal with their diplomatic tensions. Both governments agreed to restore bilateral relations ties. Ethiopia's State Minister of Foreign Affairs Mesganu Arga Moach called the step "big milestone forward in our bilateral and brotherly relations".

== See also ==
- 2024 Ethiopia–Somaliland memorandum of understanding
- Ethiopia–Somalia relations
