= 2008 in Ethiopia =

- Decades: 1980s; 1990s; 2000s; 2010s; 2020s
- See also: Other events of 2008; Timeline of Ethiopian history

The following is a list of events predicted and scheduled to take place in the year 2008 in Ethiopia.

== Incumbents ==
- President: Girma Wolde-Giorgis
- Prime Minister: Meles Zenawi

== Events ==
=== Ongoing ===
- War in Somalia
  - 2007–2008 Ethiopian crackdown in Ogaden

=== April ===
- 13–20 April – Nationwide by-election is held in local offices in the kebele and woreda assemblies.

=== May ===
- 28 May –
  - Two bombings are coordinated at two hotels in the town of Negele Boran in the Oromia Region, killing 3 people and injured 5 others.
  - Six passengers are killed and 7 other injured by explosion detonated in minibus in Addis Ababa. The Ethiopian government accuses Eritrea and OLF of orchestrating the bombing, claiming they are carrying out a "terrorist act".

=== August ===
- 8–24 August – Ethiopia participates at the 2008 Summer Olympics in Beijing, China.
- 29 August – The Ethiopian government grants clearance on NGOs to expand operation in Somali Region.

== Deaths ==
- 24 December – Menelik Wossenachew, 68, singer, pneumonia.
