= 2013 Ethiopian presidential election =

- 7 October 2013
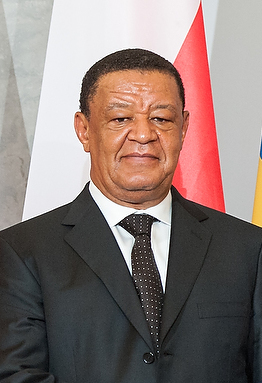
Nominee	Mulatu Teshome
Party	OPDO
Electoral vote	659 (unanimous)
President before election
Girma Wolde-Giorgis
Independent
Elected President
Mulatu Teshome
OPDO

The presidential election held on 7 October 2013, was the fourth presidential election of the Federal Democratic Republic of Ethiopia to elect the country's third president. Mulatu Teshome was elected by the parliament to a six-year term. Incumbent president Girma Wolde-Giorgis was unable to seek re-election due to term limits.

== Background and electoral process ==
As a parliamentary republic, most administrative power and the effective ability is vested in the prime minister and the government, rather than the president, leaving the president as primarily a figurehead executive. However, the president retains significant Reserve powers granted by the constitution.

A presidential candidate is required to be elected by a joint session of the upper house and lower house of the Ethiopian parliament, the Federal Parliamentary Assembly, the House of Federation and the House of Peoples' Representatives, respectively.

== Potential candidates ==
Several persons have been the subject of speculation by various media sources as potential candidates in the election. The past two presidents, Negasso Gidada, and Girma Wolde-Giorgis, have hailed from the Oromo ethnic group, the country's largest, and thus it has been speculated that the ruling party, the Ethiopian People's Revolutionary Democratic Front, will again nominate an Oromo candidate.

=== Publicly expressed interest ===
- Haile Gebrselassie, Olympic long-distance runner and businessman

=== Other potential candidates ===
- Abadula Gemeda, speaker of the House of Peoples' Representatives and former Minister of Defense
- Ashebir Woldegiorgis, independent member of parliament and former president of the Ethiopian Football Federation
- Aster Mamo, chief parliamentary whip of the government in the House of Peoples' Representatives
- Berhane Deressa, former Mayor of Addis Ababa
- Bulcha Demeksa, businessman, founder of the Awash International Bank, and former chairman of the Oromo Federalist Democratic Movement
- Eleni Gabre-Madhin, businesswoman and founder of the Ethiopia Commodity Exchange
- Eyesuswork Zafu, President of the Ethiopian Chamber of Commerce
- Genet Zewdie, Ethiopian ambassador to India
- Girma Wake, former chief executive officer of Ethiopian Airlines.
- Hailu Shawul, former chairman of the Coalition for Unity and Democracy
- Kuma Demeksa, former Mayor of Addis Ababa
- Merga Bekana, chairman of the National Elections Board
- Mulu Solomon, former President of the Ethiopian Chamber of Commerce
- Solome Tadesse, General Manager of the Ethiopian Radio and Television Authority
