= 2007 in Ethiopia =

- Decades: 1980s; 1990s; 2000s; 2010s; 2020s
- See also: Other events of 2007; Timeline of Ethiopian history

The following lists events that happened during 2007 in Ethiopia.

== Incumbents ==
- President: Girma Wolde-Giorgis
- Prime Minister: Meles Zenawi

== Events ==
=== Ongoing ===
- War in Somalia (2006–2009)

=== January ===
- 7 January – Fighting breaks out between Somali protesters and Ethiopian troops in the town of Beledweyne after an official is arrested for refusing to hand over a member of the ousted Islamic Courts Union. Three people are reportedly injured.
- 8 January – Abdullahi Yusuf Ahmed, Somalia's interim President, arrives in the capital, Mogadishu, his first visit since Mujahideen forces of the Islamic Courts Union fled advancing Ethiopian troops and interim government soldiers.
- 23 January – Ethiopia begins withdrawing troops from Mogadishu.
- 27 January – Ethiopia is going to withdraw one third of its troops stationed in Somalia by Sunday January 28, 2007, Ethiopia's Prime Minister Meles Zenawi says.

=== March ===
- 30 March – An Ethiopian helicopter is downed in Mogadishu as Ethiopian and Somali government troops battle insurgents.

=== April ===
- 22 April – More than 60 people are killed in the fourth day of heavy fighting between Ethiopian troops and Islamist militia in Mogadishu.
- 24 April - Ethiopian rebels from the Ogaden National Liberation Front raid a Chinese-run oil field in near the country's border with Somalia, killing 74.

=== July ===
- 20 July – The government of Ethiopia pardons and frees opposition leaders who had been sentenced to life imprisonment for their roles in riots following 2005 elections. Prime Minister Meles Zenawi denies that the release was forced by the United States.

=== September ===
- 1 September – International aid agency Médecins Sans Frontières has accused Ethiopia of denying it access to the country's eastern Ogaden region.
- 11 September – The Ethiopian third millennium is celebrated nationwide and concert performances organized in Millennium Hall in Addis Ababa.
- 13 September– Ethiopia will deploy 5,000 troops as part of a joint United Nations - African Union mission in the Darfur region of Sudan.

=== October ===
- 9 October – The Ethiopian Parliament re-elects Girma Wolde-Giorgis for a second six-year term.
- 21 October – The Ogaden National Liberation Front says it has carried out an attack on government troops, killing 140 troops.

=== December ===
- 28 December – Ethiopian troops have withdrawn from a key town in central Somalia. Islamist insurgents say they now control Guriel.
