= 2012 in Ethiopia =

- Decades: 1990s; 2000s; 2010s; 2020s
- See also: Other events of 2012; Timeline of Ethiopian history

The following lists events that happened during 2012 in the Federal Democratic Republic of Ethiopia.

== Incumbents ==
- President: Girma Wolde-Giorgis
- Prime Minister: Meles Zenawi (until August 20), Hailemariam Desalegn (starting August 20)

== Events ==
=== January ===
- 17 January – Unknown assailants kill 2 Hungarians, 2 Germans and an Austrian in northeastern Ethiopia.
- 25 January – A truck bomb detonates at an Ethiopian military base in Somalia.
- 28 January – The African Union opens its new headquarters in Addis Ababa.

=== August ===
- 20 August – Prime Minister Meles Zenawi died in Brussels and succeeded by Hailemariam Desalegn.

=== September ===
- 2 September – Meles' state funeral took place in Addis Ababa and inhumed at Holy Trinity Cathedral Church.

== Deaths ==
- 10 February – Sebhat Gebre-Egziabher, 75, writer.
- 10 April – Afewerk Tekle, 79, artist.
