= 2013 in Ethiopia =

- Decades: 1990s; 2000s; 2010s; 2020s
- See also: Other events of 2013; Timeline of Ethiopian history

The following lists events that happened during 2013 in Ethiopia.

== Incumbents ==
- President: Girma Wolde-Giorgis (until 7 October), Mulatu Teshome (starting 7 October)
- Prime Minister: Hailemariam Desalegn

== Events ==
=== August ===
- 8 August – Ethiopian Muslims protest during Eid al-Fitr prayers in Addis Ababa demanding the government to halt intervention on religious matter.

=== October ===
- 7 October – Mulatu Teshome succeeded Girma Wolde-Giorgis as the new president of Ethiopia.

== Deaths ==
- 23 May – Taddesse Tamrat, 77, historian and scholar of Ethiopian studies.
- 18 August – Eyob Mekonnen, 37, reggae singer, ischemic stroke.
- 22 December – Theodros Mitiku, musician and saxophonist.
- 24 December – Mikaya Behailu, 36, singer, lupus.
