= 2006 in Ethiopia =

- Decades: 1980s; 1990s; 2000s; 2010s; 2020s
- See also: Other events of 2006; Timeline of Ethiopian history

The following lists events that happened during 2006 in Ethiopia.

== Incumbents ==
- President: Girma Wolde-Giorgis
- Prime Minister: Meles Zenawi

== Events ==
=== Ongoing ===
- War in Somalia (2006–2009)

=== February ===
- 6 February – UNICEF Emergency Program Director, Dan Toole, said that 56,000 children are suffering from moderate and severe malnutrition as a result of current drought.
- 22 February – The trial date of 80 individuals accused of treason, genocide, and outrages against the Constitution relating to demonstrations last October, has been set for Thursday. The defendants include elected parliamentary members and leading members of the Coalition for Unity and Democracy, journalists, and human rights activists.

=== August ===
- 6 August – The Dechatu River floods, killing over 200 people.
- 16 August – The death toll for the floods reach over 300.

=== December ===
- 8 December – The Somali and Ethiopian militaries engage the Islamic Court Union inside Somalia.
- 24 December – Ethiopia has confirmed that its troops have invaded and are fighting Islamic militiamen that control much of Somalia.

== Deaths ==
- 25 February – Tsegaye Gabre-Medhin, 69, poet and novelist.
