= Elias Melka =

Ethiopian songwriter and composer (1977–2019)

- Elias at his studio

Background information
- Born: 10 December 1977 (Note: ታህሳስ 1 1970 in Ethiopian calendar converted to Gregorian calendar 10 December 1977.); Addis Ababa, Ethiopia
- Died: 4 October 2019 (aged 41) Addis Ababa, Ethiopia
- Occupations: Music composer; songwriter; producer
- Years active: 1998–2019
- Label: Begena Studio
- Website: www.eliasmelka.tk

Elias Melka Geresu (Amharic: ኤሊያስ መልካ ገረሱ; 10 December 1977 – 4 October 2019) was an Ethiopian record producer and songwriter. Elias became popular after successfully composing Teddy Afro's debut album Abugida, which was released in 2001. He composed more than forty studio albums and worked with many influential singers in modern Ethiopian music history. Until his death on 4 October 2019, he had played a crucial role in the Ethiopian music industry.

== Biography ==
=== Early life ===
Elias was born in Sebategna, Addis Ababa, Ethiopia to his father Melka Geresu and his mother Atsede Feleke and raised in Abinet, Addis Ababa. He was born to a Protestant family, which led him to becoming a member of a church choir. His time with the church choir instilled in him a great passion for music, and he left the church after grasping basic knowledge on music composition. He later joined Yared School of Music in Addis Ababa, majoring in cello, piano and the traditional instrument krar.

=== Career ===
Elias is believed to be the first person to introduce the practice of studio music production in Ethiopia. Some of the artists whose albums were composed by him are Teddy Afro, Gossaye Tesfaye, Mikaya Behailu, Eyob Mekonnen, Zeritu Kebede, Tigist Bekele, Haile Roots, Gete Anley, Berry, and Leul Hailu. He was also a leader in taking social responsibility, having produced more than half a dozen singles that deal with HIV/AIDS and traffic accidents and others. These songs made by himself and collaborated with others greatly helped the effort to educate people about these societal dangers. From those, "Ashkerkir Rega Bileh" and "Mela Belu" are the priors.

Music passes through all its glory through Elias

— Zeritu Kebede,

His works also encompassed Biblical incitation artistic works, some of which are "Yenem Ayn Aytual", a song by Zeritu Kebede, and a choir titled "Nur Batamnm". There are also many other songs which played by famous Ethiopian artists, namely: Eyob Mekonnen, Zeritu Kebede, Haile Roots, Leul Hailu, Gete Anley, and Berry. Elias was successful and known to nurture new musicians and improve the singing style of notable ones.

==== Bands ====
Elias' first band was Zion, a religious music band, which he left to join Medina Band. He played guitar in Medina Band and then left to join Zema Lastas, Afro Sound Band, and 3M band.

=== Award ===
Elias won four awards in Ethiopia, the first of which is WIPO's International Award which was given to Ethiopian musicians. The second was an award given to him for composing different Kunama songs, the third was given by the Fana Broadcasting Corporate, local broadcasting media, as a Life Time Award, and the last one was by Addis Music Award, for his great efforts and contributions to the growth of Ethiopian music.

Understanding the unprofitable nature of the music industry in Ethiopia, he worked for a system that enables the artist to get royalties from their songs, which is known as Awtar Music Application.

== Death ==
After struggling with diabetes and kidney complications, Elias died on 4 October 2019. Following this, people showed their condolences on social media. Teddy Afro made a Facebook post saying, "I would like to express my deepest condolences on the death of our beloved composer, Elias Melka. Elias will always be remembered above the grave for his career in music and his works of art. I sincerely hope that the Almighty God may place his soul in heaven and give comfort to all his fans, friends, relatives and colleagues." The Mayor of Addis Ababa at the time, Takele Uma Banti, expressed his condolences on Twitter saying, "Saddened to learn the passing of renowned lyricist and composer, Elias Melka. We lost a talented and influential figure in the music industry. My condolences to his family and fans."
