= Zeritu Kebede =

Ethiopian singer and actress (born 1984)

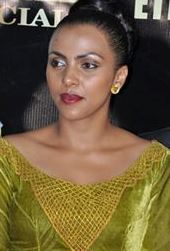
- Zeritu in 2015

Background information
- Born: 19 February 1984 (age 42); Addis Ababa, Ethiopia
- Genre: Pop
- Occupations: Singer; songwriter; actress; screenwriter
- Years active: 2005–present
- Labels: Hope Music Entertainment; Minew Shewa Entertainment; Nahom Records
- Website: zeritukebede.com

Zeritu Kebede (born 19 February 1984) is an Ethiopian singer, songwriter, actress, screenwriter. A prominent figure in modern Ethiopian music, especially in the era of 2000s, she is known for energetic pop and rock hits.

Her debut album Zeritu released in 2005.

In addition to music career, she invested in film career, starring in numerous Ethiopian films such as Kemis Yelebesku'let (2014) and Pagumen 7 (2017).

== Early life ==
Zeritu Kebede was born in Addis Ababa on 19 February 1984. Her father, Kebede Woldegiorgis, was an architect, and her mother, Engida Mitiku, was a housewife who was thirty years younger than her husband.

Zeritu grew up in the Gulele area in northern Addis Ababa. She was brought up in a strict manner and isolated from the other children in the neighbourhood. However, Zeritu spent most of her summers with her maternal grandparents, who were very liberal and very close to their neighbors. There, she got the opportunity to meet and play with kids from families with different social statuses.

Zeritu attended Lazarist Catholic elementary school.

== Career ==
Zeritu has been interested in music since she was young. She went on stage for the first time while she was a fifth grader, singing the Michael Jackson song "Will You Be There". Later, she started writing songs and short plays with her friends and performing them. That was the time she decided that it was what she wanted to do for the rest of her life. While still in high school, Zeritu and her friends made their first money from "Yegeterua Emebet", a song they co-wrote and performed, which was to be made into a sound track for a program on ETV on the issue of early and forced marriage, although the program never aired for unknown reasons.

After high school, Zeritu decided to start singing professionally. Through her connection with Henok Mehari, a singer and keyboard player, she went on to join Sweet Band. But after only one gig at the Famous Lion's Club, the band was replaced. Zeritu then auditioned to join the renowned Express Band and was hired. At Express Band, Zeritu played songs of Celine Dion, Tracy Chapman, Mariah Carey, Lauryn Hill, Shania Twain, Norah Jones, and Shakira, among others, at several events and clubs.

While working at Express Band, Zeritu was going to Adama University, located 100 kilometers outside of Addis Ababa. But after half a semester, she dropped out and decided to fully focus on her career.

Zeritu then auditioned successfully for a role in a television drama series to be directed by the renowned Ethiopian director, Abate Mekuria. Although the drama she auditioned for never aired, she performed in another play written and directed by Abate Mekuria and took part in the East African Theater Festival held in Mombasa, Kenya.

While working on her own debut album at Begena Studio, Zeritu was offered a part on a group song that was being produced for raising awareness on HIV/AIDS. The song "Mela", written by Mikael Belayneh and Yilma Gebreab and produced by Elias Melka, involved singers like Menelik Wossenachew, Alemayehu Eshete, and Tamrat Mola.

=== Music career ===
After 18 months in the studio, in September 2005, Zeritu's debut self-titled album Zeritu was released. The album that included songs like "Endaygelegne", the first single from the album, her youth favorite, "Deg Abate Kifu Balua", a song which was critically praised for its lyricism and Zeritu's personal favourite Yane, became one of the most successful albums in the history of Ethiopian music.

From March 2006 to April 2006, Zeritu went on a national tour Guzo Zeritu and performed in major Ethiopian cities including Addis Ababa, Adama, Hawassa, Dire Dawa, Harar, Bahir Dar, Jimma, Mekelle, Dessie and Gondar. The tour was the first of its kind and also included another famous singer Abinet Agonafir who wrote and performed "Akal le Akal", a duet with Zeritu for her debut album. The tour was backed by the Mehari Brothers Band, which was founded by Henok Mehari.

Zeritu wrote the songs "Tiwedegnalech" and their duet from the album Yene Qonjo for Eyob Mekonnen's debut album released in 2007. Zeritu also wrote Eyob's single "Yefikir Akukulu" which was released later.

Zeritu toured the United States with the Mehari Brothers and played on a few stages in Europe and in the UAE. She also started experimenting with jazz and acoustic bands and performed on several stages.

Zeritu released "Artificial" in 2014. The song was released in various platforms; it was released in Amazon and Google Play Store on 2 August 2014. In August 2014, "Demo Yewend Konjo" was released. On 20 April 2017, Zeritu released "Wushetam" from album Eza Alkerem. It is influenced by jazz ballad.

On 9 March 2018, Zeritu released "Love Love Love", featuring Xola Malik and Scott Krippayne from an album of the same name.

On 22 December 2018, "Azmari" was released, with 303,197 views in video sharing website YouTube shortly after. The music video features various musicians cameo appearance like Jano Band's members Dibekulu Tafesse and Hailu Amelga, Betty G, Henok Mehari, Lij Michael and Dan Admasu.

Zeritu collaborated with singer Tadele Gemechu and released "Lib Yaleh" on 24 October 2019 through Minew Shewa Entertainment. The song internationally acclaimed and issued on UNICEF for conveyance of maternal mortality in rural community. The music video, funded by a Global Affairs Canada grant through the University of Alberta's Maternal Health project in Ethiopia, was directed by Daniel Tamrat, and produced by UNICEF Ambassador Thomas T. Gobena. Executive producer was Professor Michael Frishkopf, Department of Music, University of Alberta.

Zeritu has been featured artist of Sofia Shibabaw's single "Yeselam Sew Neñ", released on 24 April 2020, along with ensemble musicians like Chachi Tadesse, Betty G and Israel Abel. In June 2020, she announced on her Facebook account that she would release an album called Nigat.

Zeritu held an organized concert behind closed door called Nigat Concert on 23 August 2020. The concert has been live streamed through state TV channels. It is believed to be the biggest concert during COVID-19 pandemic. In 2025, she released "Tinante ena Zare", blending contemporary music to spiritual influence.

=== Film career ===
In December 2012, Zeritu picked on her career in acting and film production when she began the production of the film Kemis Yelebesku'let. Later released on 12 January 2014. Zeritu co-wrote, produced and acted in the film, and wrote and performed the soundtrack song of the film Alehu, produced by Abegaz K. Shiota, who also scored the film's music.

In the film, Zeritu plays a slightly tom-boyish college girl who refuses to date, stating it is a waste of time since we all really are alone. The character eventually finds love and gets in touch with her femininity that nature initially intended. The film has been a national success, being acclaimed by viewers and by critics. Zeritu's second acting role came when she acted in Taza, released in October 2017.

Zeritu's third film, Pagumen 7, which she wrote was released theatrically in June 2017.

== Personal life ==
Zeritu has been married to Lakachew Mengistu since 2005. She is the mother of three boys. Christian Lakachew, her eldest son, died in 2024.

Zeritu's husband, Lakachew Mengistu, a football player and a business man, is the son of the Ethiopian football player and coach Mengistu Worku.

=== Religion ===
Zeritu is a born-again Protestant Christian. Most of her songs incorporate reverence to God. She believes in "just following Jesus Christ and striving to live according to the Word of God."

== Discography ==
Studio albums

- Zeritu (2005)
- Artificial (2014)
- Eza Alkerehum (2017)
- Love Love Love (2018)
- Azmari Negn (2018)
- Nigat (2020)
- Atihidibign (2023)
- Matsnanatih - Live (2025)

== See also ==
- Liya Kebede
- Elias Melka
