= 2015 in Ethiopia =

- Decades: 1990s; 2000s; 2010s; 2020s
- See also: Other events of 2015; Timeline of Ethiopian history

The following events occurred during the year 2015 in Ethiopia.

== Incumbents ==
- Prime Minister: Hailemariam Desalegn
- President: Mulatu Teshome

== Events ==
=== Ongoing ===
- Oromo protests

=== February ===
- 1 February – Testing of the Addis Ababa Light Rail, the first light railway in Sub-Saharan Africa, begins.

=== March ===
- 5 March – 2015 African Junior Athletics Championships begin in Addis Ababa.

=== April ===
- 19 April – 2015 Islamic State killing of Christian migrants in Libya: Islamic State in Libya Province releases beheading video of approximately 30 Ethiopian Christian immigrants, resulting in broader outrage and condemnation in Ethiopia.

=== May ===
- 24 May – Voters go to the polls to vote in the general elections with the ruling party facing no viable opposition.

=== September ===
- 20 September – First line of the Addis Ababa Light Rail opens.

=== October ===
- 10 October – The Gilgel Gibe III Dam begins to generate power.

=== November ===
- 21 November – The 2015 CECAFA Cup, hosted in Addis Ababa, begins.

== Deaths ==
- 12 September – Seble Tefera, 39, actress (Betoch, Yarefede Arada), car crash.
