= 2001 in Ethiopia =

- Decades: 1980s; 1990s; 2000s; 2010s; 2020s
- See also: Other events of 2001; Timeline of Ethiopian history

The following lists events that happened during 2001 in Ethiopia.

== Incumbents ==
- President: Negasso Gidada (until October 8), Girma Wolde-Giorgis (from October 8)
- Prime Minister: Meles Zenawi

== Events ==
=== January ===
- 10 January – Ethiopia rejects Djibouti's port-handling charges for imports and exports with them, claiming it to be a violation of an agreement in 1999.
- 13 January – Diplomatic tension rises with Somalia, who accuses Ethiopia of attempting to create a secessionist state in the already unstable country.
- 25 January – Somalia's Prime Minister accuses Ethiopia of destabilizing his country by massing troops in the south west.

=== February ===
- 20 February –Thousands of Ethiopian troops begin withdrawing from Eritrea after a successful peace agreement after the Eritrean-Ethiopian War.
- 24 February – Ethiopia declares the withdrawal from Eritrea complete.

=== April ===
- 12 April – Police crack down on student protesters, demanding greater freedom of speech. This leaves 50 students hospitalised.
- 17 April – Hundreds of riot police storm in and beat up civilians during the riots including women and children in the capital of Addis Ababa.
- 18 April – Thousands of students clash with police during the second day of rioting.
- 21 April – The Ethiopian Human Rights Council denies that student protesters are being held in detention camps, causing anger among relatives of the missing students.
- 24 April – Addis Ababa University reopens after temporary closure during riots that left 39 killed and 250 injured.
- 26 April – More than 2000 students are released from prison by riot police. Several students report instances of torture while incarcerated.

=== May ===
- 4 May – The political tension is reported to have risen since the April riots.

=== October ===
- 8 October – Girma Wolde-Giorgis elected as the new president of Ethiopia, succeeded Negasso Gidada.

=== November ===
- 15 November – Animal smuggling is reported to have cost the country 100 million dollars every year.
