= 2016 in Ethiopia =

- Decades: 1990s; 2000s; 2010s; 2020s
- See also: Other events of 2016; Timeline of Ethiopian history

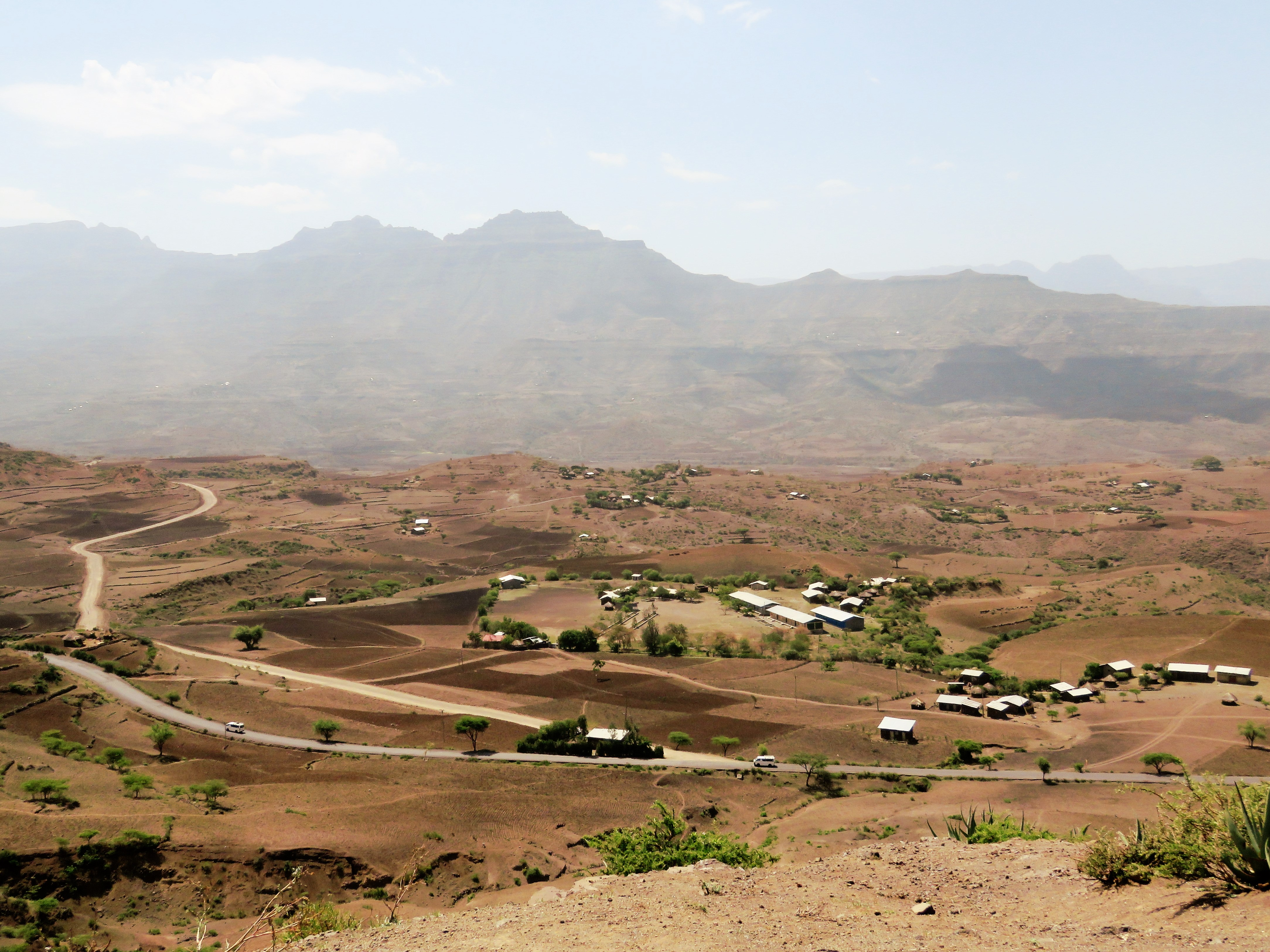
Lalibela, Ethiopia in 2016

The following lists events that happened during 2016 in Ethiopia.

== Incumbents ==
- President: Mulatu Teshome
- Prime Minister: Hailemariam Desalegn

== Events ==
=== Ongoing ===
- Oromo protests

=== April ===
- 6 April – Seasonal rains come early to the country, causing floods, leaving at least 28 people dead.
- 16 April – Ethiopia claims that South Sudanese men killed at least 140 people across the border.

=== June ===
- 13 June – Ethiopia and Eritrea argue over who caused a recent border clash between the two nations.

=== August ===
- 5 August – Student protests erupt in Addis Ababa and quickly spread across the country.
- 8 August – Over 50 protesters are killed by security forces over the past few days. Internet and journalist access is also restricted by the government.

=== September ===
- 5 September – 23 prisoners are killed in a fire and stampede at the Kaliti Prison near the capital of Addis Ababa during an attempted prison break.

=== October ===
- 2 October – Police allegedly attack Oromo protesters at a religious festival in Bishoftu, causing a stampede that killed 52 people.
- 5 October – The railway line with Djibouti opens. However, an American women is killed during protests.
- 9 October – A state of emergency is declared following months of protests against the government.
- 10 October – Ethiopia blames Egypt and Eritrea for the recent unrest in the country.
- 20 October – A government minister reveals that over 1600 people have been detained following the state of emergency.

=== November ===
- 24 November – 20 aircraft pilots are detained in Ethiopia's Gambela region after "illegally" arriving from Sudan.

=== December ===
- 1 December – After arriving back from a trip to Europe, Merera Gudina, an opposition leader, is detained for allegedly violating the state of emergency.
