= 2003 in Ethiopia =

- Decades: 1980s; 1990s; 2000s; 2010s; 2020s
- See also: Other events of 2003; Timeline of Ethiopian history

The following lists events that happened during 2003 in Ethiopia.

== Incumbents ==
- President: Girma Wolde-Giorgis
- Prime Minister: Meles Zenawi

== Events ==
=== January ===
- January 11 - A drought has spread across the country being one of the worst in the country's history.
- January 24 - The Ethiopian government denies harassing teachers and students opposed to the regime during riots in 2001.

=== November ===
- November 18 - The United Nations' World Food Programme has warned that the need for aid in Ethiopia is set to soar.

=== December ===
- December 10 - Near the border with Somalia, farmers have been growing khat instead of coffee.
