= 2009 in Ethiopia =

- Decades: 1980s; 1990s; 2000s; 2010s; 2020s
- See also: Other events of 2009; Timeline of Ethiopian history

The following lists events that happened during 2009 in Ethiopia.

== Incumbents ==
- President: Girma Wolde-Giorgis
- Prime Minister: Meles Zenawi

== Events ==
=== Ongoing ===
- War in Somalia (2006–2009)

=== January ===
- 2 January – Ethiopia begins withdrawing troops from Somalia after two years of intervention in the civil war.

=== April ===
- 22 April – Ten of thousands Ethiopians attend the state funeral of singer Tilahun Gessesse, becoming the largest lying of state since the funeral of Emperor Haile Selassie.

=== July ===
- 7 July – Ethiopia introduces Anti-Terrorism Proclamation No. 652/2009 to counter domestic terrorism.

== Deaths ==
- 19 April – Tilahun Gessesse, 68, singer, diabetes.
