= 2014 in Ethiopia =

- Decades: 1990s; 2000s; 2010s; 2020s
- See also: Other events of 2014; Timeline of Ethiopian history

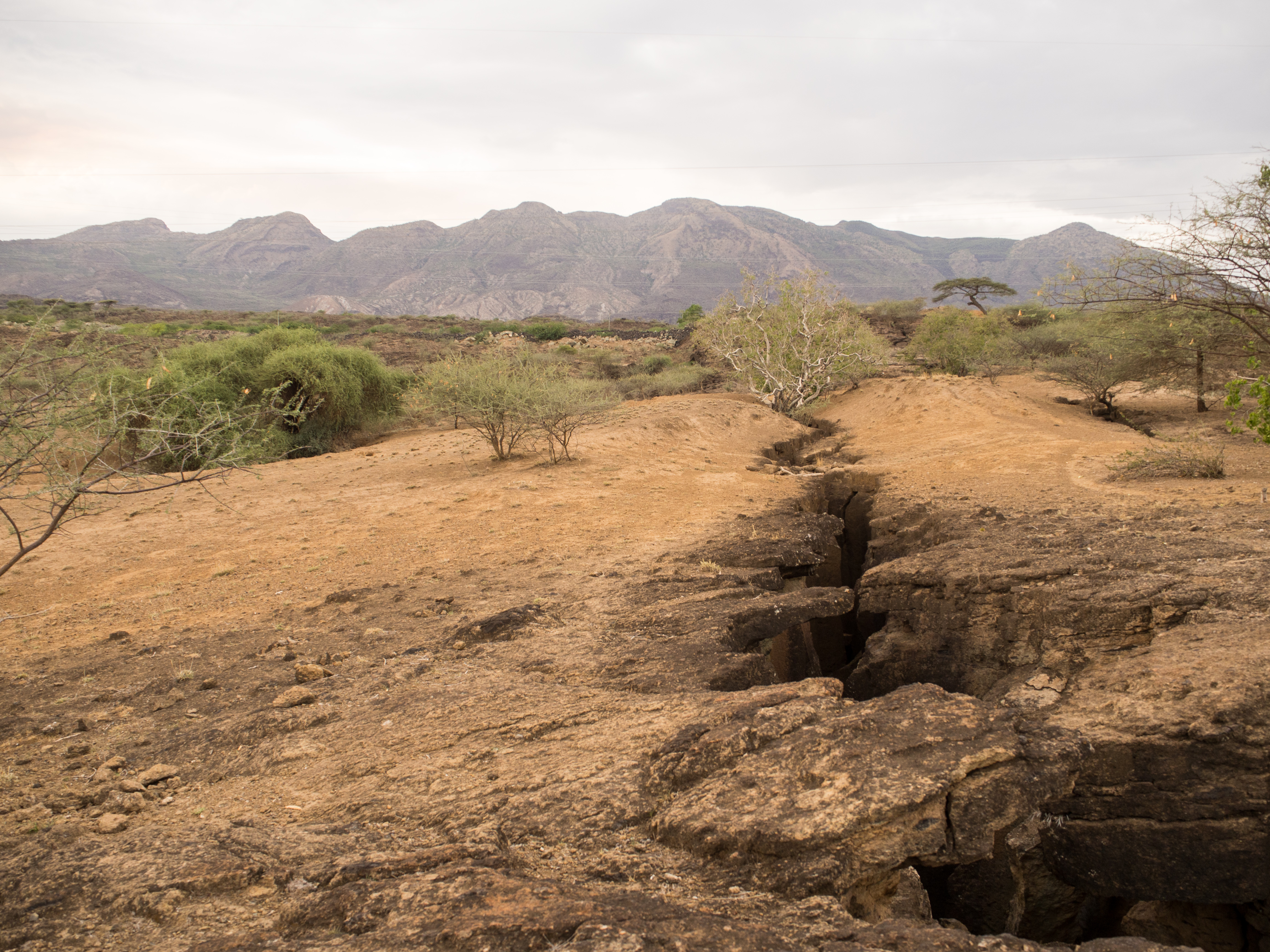
Rift in an old lava flow, nearby Mont Fentale, Ethiopia, in 2014

The following lists events that happened during 2014 in Ethiopia.

== Incumbents ==
- President: Mulatu Teshome
- Prime Minister: Hailemariam Desalegn

== Events ==
=== Ongoing ===
- Oromo protests

=== February ===
- 17 February – The Ethiopian Airlines Flight 702 between Addis Ababa and Rome is diverted to land at Geneva in an attempted hijacking by the co-pilot who claims to be seeking political asylum.

=== April ===
- 16 April – Gunmen ambush a bus killing nine people and wounding six others in western Ethiopia near the Sudanese border.

=== May ===
- 2 May – At least nine students are killed in protests in Oromia Region.

=== November ===
- 4 November – In Johannesburg, Angolan journalist and human rights campaigner Rafael Marques says the African Union should move its headquarters out of Ethiopia because of concerns about freedom of expression there.

=== December ===
- 6 December – At least 70 drown when a migrant boat from Ethiopia sinks off the Red Sea coast of Yemen.

== Deaths ==
- 6 March – Alemayehu Atomsa, 45, President of Oromia Region (2010–2014).
