= 2010 in Ethiopia =

- Decades: 1990s; 2000s; 2010s; 2020s
- See also: Other events of 2010; Timeline of Ethiopian history

The following is a list of events that took place in the year 2010 in Ethiopia.

== Incumbents ==
- President: Girma Wolde-Giorgis
- Prime Minister: Meles Zenawi

== Events ==
=== January ===
- 25 January – The Ethiopian Airlines Flight 409, scheduled from Beirut to Addis Ababa, crashes into the Mediterranean Sea shortly after takeoff from Rafic Hariri International Airport.

=== May ===
- 23 May – A general election held resulting in landslide victory of the Ethiopian People's Revolutionary Democratic Front (EPRDF).

== Deaths ==
- 18 January – Eyasu Berhe, 53, musician and activist, heart attack.
