= Mulu Solomon =

Ethiopian businesswoman (born 1958)

Mulu Solomon Bezuneh is an Ethiopian businesswoman, writer and consultant, the first woman to be appointed as a president of the Ethiopian Chamber of Commerce.

== Early life ==
Mulu Solomon was born in 1958 in Qarre Goha, Oromia, Ethiopia. She attended Qarre Goha primary school and Fiche Secondary School. After high school, she earned a diploma from the Commercial School in Addis Ababa, followed by a B.A. in Accounting with a minor in Business Administration at Addis Ababa University. Subsequently she earned an M.A. in Development Studies, with a concentration in Environment and Development, at Addis Ababa University.

== Awards ==
Mulu Solomon has received several awards including a United Nations Certificate of Merit Award of Honor; an Honorary Award from Serve the Generation Association; a Star Worker Pin from the Ethiopian Import Export Corp.(ETIMEX); an Extraordinary Leader & Manager Gold Award from D H Geda; and Addis Ababa University EiABC, Certificate of Honor for delivering high-quality teaching.
