= 2011 in Ethiopia =

- Decades: 1990s; 2000s; 2010s; 2020s
- See also: Other events of 2011; Timeline of Ethiopian history

The following is a list of events predicted and scheduled to take place in the year 2011 in Ethiopia.

== Incumbents ==
- President: Girma Wolde-Giorgis
- Prime Minister: Meles Zenawi

== Events ==
- 1 July – Swedish journalists Martin Schibbye and Johan Persson captured along with ONLF rebels in Somali Region, resulting in the litigation Ethiopian Judicial Authority v Swedish journalists.
