= 2027 in Ethiopia =

- Decades: 2000s; 2010s; 2020s
- See also: Other events of 2027; Timeline of Ethiopian history

The following is a list of events predicted and scheduled to take place in the year 2027 in Ethiopia.

== Events ==
=== January ===
- TBA – 2027 United Nations Climate Change Conference
- 2 August – Solar eclipse of August 2, 2027 (partial eclipse)
