= 2026 in Ethiopia =

- Decades: 2000s; 2010s; 2020s
- See also: Other events of 2026; Timeline of Ethiopian history

The following is a list of events predicted and scheduled to take place in the year 2026 in Ethiopia.

== Incumbents ==
- President: Taye Atskeselassie
- Prime Minister: Abiy Ahmed

== Events ==
=== Ongoing ===
- Fano insurgency
- Smart City Project

=== January ===
- 6 January – A truck carrying emigrants overturns in Semera, Afar Region, killing 22 people and injuring 65 others.
- 10 January – Construction officially begins on the Bishoftu International Airport.
- 14 January – Police in Amhara Region seize more than 50,000 rounds of ammunition believed to have originated from Eritrea and destined for Fano rebels.
- 15 January – A friendly fire drone strike by government forces on an allied militia camp kills 40 fighters in Wag Hemra Zone, Amhara Region.
- 26 January – The first outbreak of Marburg virus in Ethiopia officially ends after 14 cases and nine fatalities since November in Jinka.
- 28 January – Police arrest 22 people accused of trafficking 1,800 migrants, of which two died and 15 disappeared, and collecting 2.16 billion birr ($13 million) from the proceeds.
- 29 January – Ethiopian Airlines cancels all flights to the Tigray Region after clashes erupt between national forces and the Tigray People's Liberation Front (TPLF).
- 30 January – A U.S. federal judge temporarily blocks the Trump administration from ending Temporary Protected Status (TPS) for more than 5,000 Ethiopians living in the United States, delaying the planned 13 February termination.
- 31 January – Alleged Ethiopian National Defense Force drone strikes in Tigray Region kill one person and injure another near Enticho and Gendebta.

=== February ===
- 3 February – The Ethiopian government formally acknowledges the involvement of Eritrean military forces in the Tigray war and accuses them of mass killings in Tigray Region during the conflict.
- 22 February – At least 100 militants from the AFNM and ENDF are killed following clashes in Shawira, Central Gondar Zone, Amhara Region.
- 24 February – The Ethiopian Media Authority revokes the license of the independent online outlet Addis Standard on charges of harming national interests.

=== March ===
- 10 March – At least 125 people are killed in floods and landslides caused by heavy rainfall in Gamo Zone, South Ethiopia.

=== April ===
- 16 April – Teddy Afro releases his anticipated album Etorika on YouTube, amassing millions of views and support from broader Ethiopian community.
- 19 April – The TPLF announces that it is retaking control over the government of Tigray Region.

=== May ===
- 5 May –
  - Sudan recalls its ambassador to Ethiopia after accusing the latter country of carrying out a drone attack on Khartoum International Airport the previous day.
  - The TPLF restores Tigray’s pre-war legislative council and elects Debretsion Gebremichael as regional president.

=== June ===
- 1 June – 2026 Ethiopian general election: The ruling Prosperity Party of prime minister Abiy Ahmed secures a large majority of 438 seats in the House of Peoples' Representatives.
- 12 June – Long-distance runner Gudaf Tsegay is handed a four-month ban by the Athletics Integrity Unit (AIU) after testing positive for a metabolite of the prohibited substance letrozole in December 2025.
- 15 June – At least 31 people are killed when an overcrowded bus travelling from Dessie to Addis Ababa veers off a mountainous road near Harego and plunges into a 100 metre-deep ravine.
- 23 June – The Government of National Stability in eastern Libya bans the entry of nationals from Sudan, Eritrea, Ethiopia, and Somalia, citing a reorganization of foreign nationals' entry procedures.

=== August ===
- 3 August – A landslide hits the Tsadkane Mariam Monastery in North Shewa Zone, Amhara Region, killing 14 people.
- 10 August – A drone strike from the Ethiopian National Defense Force on a secondary school in Raya Alamata district, Tigray Region, reportedly kills four people and wounds at least seven others.
- 23 August – Yomif Kejelcha reclaims the men's half marathon world record in Buenos Aires, winning in 56:51, 29 seconds faster than Jacob Kiplimo's previous record.

=== September ===
- 20 September – Seven major armed groups (Fano, TPLF, OLA, ONLF, Ugugumo, BPLM, and GPDM) form the Ethiopian Peoples’ Forces Alliance for Survival (EPFAS), citing the aim to overthrow the federal government and establish a provisional government.
- 21 September – Clashes break out between government forces and the TPLF in Tigray Region.
- 30 September – A group of Israelis are rescued from Lalibela following days of being stuck due to fighting in Tigray.

=== October ===
- 1 October – Eritrea severs diplomatic relations with Ethiopia amid fighting in Tigray.
- 4 October – The TPLF withdraws from the Tigrayan capital Mekelle.
- 8 October – Prime Minister Abiy appoints Fitsum Assefa as finance minister, replacing Ahmed Shide, who becomes speaker of the House of Peoples' Representatives.
- 23 October – Nine people are killed in clashes between Oromo and Somali ethnic groups in Moyale; thousands flee across the Ethiopia–Kenya border as a result.
- 24 October – At least 60 Orthodox Christians are killed in two attacks within the Oromia region on the Ethiopian Orthodox Tewahedo Church.
- 30 October – At least 15 people are killed after multiple drone strikes hit the Jari 2 displacement camp in the Amhara region.

=== November ===
- 4 November – The government closes the Sudanese consulate in Asosa, ordering its six diplomats to leave within 48 hours amid escalating diplomatic tensions between the two countries.

== Deaths ==
- 16 January – Netsanet Workneh, 42, actor, filmmaker and TV personality.
- 15 June – Semahegn Belew, 58, singer.
- 5 July – Rahel Yohannes, 79, singer, songwriter and instrumentalist.
