= 2005 in Ethiopia =

- Decades: 1980s; 1990s; 2000s; 2010s; 2020s
- See also: Other events of 2005; Timeline of Ethiopian history

The following lists events that happened during 2005 in Ethiopia.

== Incumbents ==
- President: Girma Wolde-Giorgis
- Prime Minister: Meles Zenawi

== Events ==
=== January ===
- 2 January – Over 50,000 people demonstrate in the capital of Addis Ababa against government plans to renew talks on the border with Eritrea.

=== April ===
- 19 April – The first part of the Obelisk of Axum is returned to Ethiopia after being taken by Mussolini to Rome in 1937.
- 25 April – The third and last part of the Obelisk is returned to Ethiopia.

=== May ===
- 10 May – Human Rights Watch accuses Ethiopia of harassment and detention of opposition politicians in the Oromia region.
- 15 May – A general election held for seats in the House of Peoples' Representatives and four regional government councils.
- 16 May – Prime Minister Zenawi bans demonstrations in the capital of Addis Ababa after allegations by the opposition that the ruling Ethiopian People's Revolutionary Democratic Front has been involved in harassment of opposition members and electoral fraud.
- 28 May – Provisional results reveal the EPRDF has won the majority of seats in government but the opposition claims rigging was involved and the election results are due on June 8.

=== June ===
- 6 June – Over 500 students are arrested following protests against the elections. The election result date has been postponed to July 8th after allegations of fraud by the opposition.
- 11 June – Opposition members allege the government of keeping Coalition for Unity and Democracy leader Hailu Shawel and senior official Lidetu Ayalew under house arrest and demand their release.
- 22 June – Opposition parties claim that the government investigators had dropped all claims of electoral fraud.

=== July ===
- 8 July – The first poll results for the elections in May reveal the EPRDF winning. CUD alleges fraud and protests in Addis Ababa leave at least 36 dead.
- 25 July – Five people are killed in bomb blasts at a night club in the Somali region.

=== November ===
- 1 November – Protests unleash in Addis Ababa due to allegations of election fraud, causing clashes leading to 2 police officers and 6 protesters dying.
- 3 November – In the third day of protests, the death toll of people killed in clashes between protesters and police rises to at least 40.
- 4 November – Violence begins to die down in the capital with clashes still being prevalent in Debre Berhan. However, few shops are open and no taxis are operating.
- 13 November – Prime Minister Zenawi defends the government from critics after the police violently crackdown on protesters and opposition members are imprisoned on treason charges.
