= Climate change in Ethiopia =

Emissions, impacts and responses of Ethiopia related to climate change

Köppen climate classification map for Ethiopia for 1980–2016

2071–2100 map under the worst climate change scenario. Mid-range scenarios are currently considered more likely

Climate change in Ethiopia is affecting the people in Ethiopia due to increased floods, heat waves and infectious diseases. In the Awash basin in central Ethiopia floods and droughts are common. Agriculture in the basin is mainly rainfed (without irrigation systems). This applies to around 98% of total cropland as of 2012. So changes in rainfall patterns due to climate change will reduce economic activities in the basin. Rainfall shocks have a direct impact on agriculture. A rainfall decrease in the Awash basin could lead to a 5% decline in the basin's overall GDP. The agricultural GDP could even drop by as much as 10%.

== Impact on the natural environment ==
=== Temperature and weather changes ===
Between 1960 and 2006, the mean annual temperature increased by 1.3°C. On average, the rate would be 0.28°C in temperature per decade. A study from 2008 predicted further warming of 0.7°C and 2.3°C by 2020s and 1.4°C by 2050s.

=== Rainfall, droughts and floods impact ===
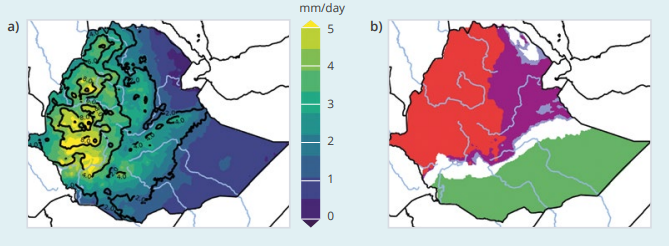
Rainfall regimes vary across Ethiopia. Left figure: Annual average rainfall in mm/day with the interquartile range (25th–75th) of monthly rainfall in mm/day indicated by black contours (1981–2020). Right figure: Three rainfall zones in Ethiopia with different seasonal rainfall patterns. The green zone has two separate rainy seasons, and the red zone has a single peak in rainfall in Jun to September.

Ethiopia has two main wet seasons per year. It rains in the spring and summer. These seasonal patterns of rainfall vary a lot across the country. Western Ethiopia has a seasonal rainfall pattern that is similar to the Sahel. It has rainfall from February to November (which is decreasing to the north), and has peak rainfall from June to September. Southern Ethiopia has a rainfall pattern similar to the one in East Africa. There are two distinct wet seasons every year, February to May, and October to November. Central and eastern Ethiopia has some rainfall between February and November, with a smaller peak in rainfall from March to May and a second higher peak from June to September.

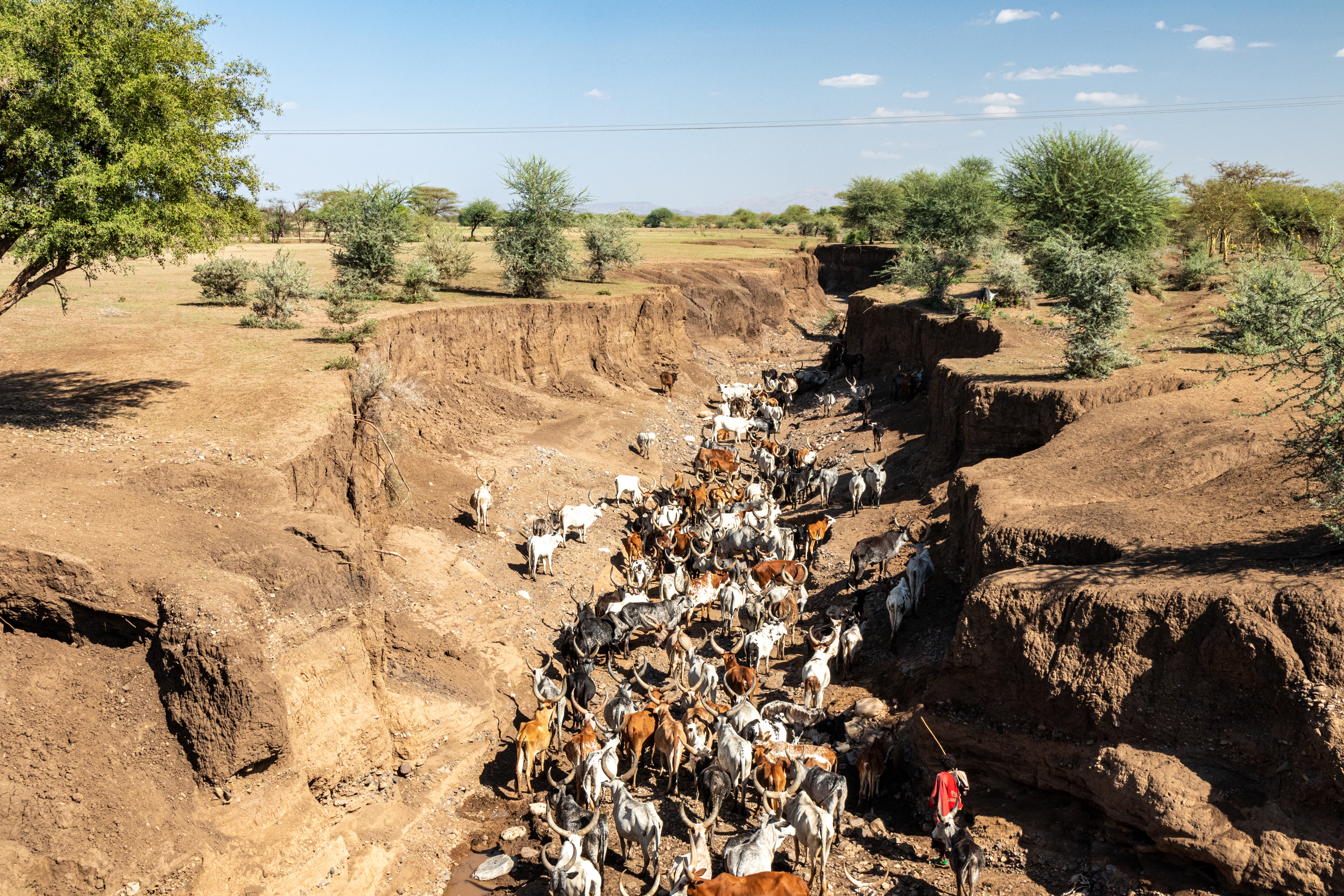
Cattle herd in riverbed of Afar Region

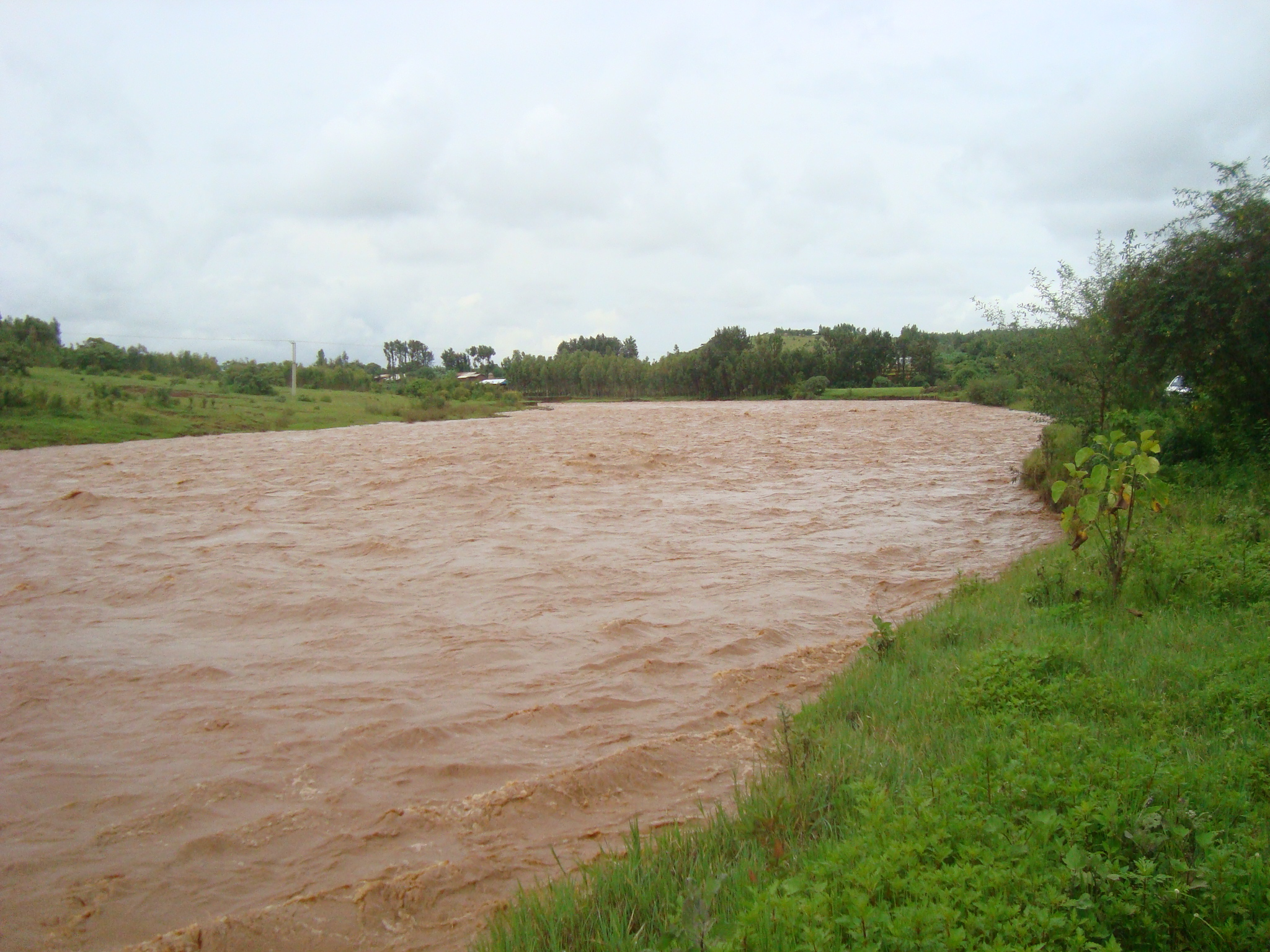
Gilgel Abbay during flood

In 2022 Ethiopia had one of the most severe La Niña-induced droughts in the last forty years. It came about due to four consecutive rainy seasons which did not produce enough rain. This drought increased water insecurity for more than 8 million pastoralists and agro-pastoralists in the Somali, Oromia, SNNP and South-West regions. About 7.2 million people needed food aid, and 4.4 million people needed help to access water. Food prices have increased a lot due to the drought conditions. Many people in the affected area have experienced food shortages due to the water insecurity situation.

The exact attribution of climate change to the occurrence of droughts and floods in Ethiopia is difficult. One study from 2022 stated for Ethiopia: "While regional models predict increase in rainfall, higher resolution analyses for Ethiopia suggest spatial variations in which there are both increases and decreases in the overall rainfall averages. An increase in the rainfall variability is also predicted, with a rising frequency of both extreme flooding and droughts that could seriously affect agricultural production."

Significant droughts lead to drying of water resources and eventually water scarcity. Subsequent outcomes include poor hygiene and can lead to faeco-oral transmission of disease.

In 2016, deadly floods hit Ethiopia, leaving at least 200 people dead and over 200,000 people homeless as seasonal rains came early to the country. Causes for floods can be deforestation, presence of rivers such as the Baro, Akobo, Gilo, and Alwero, in low lying homogeneous topography and climate change.

Due to an increase in heavy rainfall events, floods are likely to become more severe when they do occur. The interactions between rainfall and flooding are complex. There are some regions in which flooding is expected to become rarer. This depends on several factors. These include changes in rain and snowmelt, but also soil moisture. Climate change leaves soils drier in some areas, so they may absorb rainfall more quickly. This leads to less flooding. Dry soils can also become harder. In this case heavy rainfall runs off into rivers and lakes. This increases risks of flooding.

Climate change affects many factors associated with droughts. These include how much rain falls and how fast the rain evaporates again. Warming over land increases the severity and frequency of droughts around much of the world. In some tropical and subtropical regions of the world, there will probably be less rain due to global warming. This will make them more prone to drought. Droughts are set to worsen in many regions of the world. These include Central America, the Amazon and south-western South America. They also include West and Southern Africa. The Mediterranean and south-western Australia are also some of these regions.

Higher temperatures increase evaporation. This dries the soil and increases plant stress. Agriculture suffers as a result. This means even regions where overall rainfall is expected to remain relatively stable will experience these impacts. These regions include central and northern Europe. Without climate change mitigation, around one third of land areas are likely to experience moderate or more severe drought by 2100. Due to global warming droughts are more frequent and intense than in the past.

Several social factors may worsen the impact of droughts. These are increased water demand, population growth and urban expansion in many areas. Land restoration techniques, such as agroforestry, can help reduce the impact of droughts.

== Impact on people ==
=== Economic impacts ===
Climate change also affects the gross domestic product (GDP) of the country by reducing between 0.5% and 2.5% each year (estimate for 2010).

In the Awash basin in central Ethiopia floods and droughts are common. Agriculture in the basin is mainly rainfed (without irrigation systems). This applies to around 98% of total cropland as of 2012. So changes in rainfall patterns due to climate change will reduce economic activities in the basin. Rainfall shocks have a direct impact on agriculture. A rainfall decrease in the Awash basin could lead to a 5% decline in the basin's overall GDP. The agricultural GDP could even drop by as much as 10%.
