= Mikaya Behailu =

Ethiopian singer (1977–2013)

- Mikaya Behailu photoshoot

Background information
- Born: 30 May 1977; Addis Ababa, Ethiopia
- Origin: Addis Ababa, Ethiopia
- Died: 24 December 2013 (aged 36) Black Lion Hospital, Addis Ababa, Ethiopia
- Genres: Ethiopian music
- Years active: 1990s–2013
- Label: Nahom Records

Mikaya Behailu (Amharic: ሚካያ በሃይሉ; 30 May 1977 – 24 December 2013) was an Ethiopian singer who gained prominence for her 2007 album Shemametew. She was nominated for the 2009 Kora Music Award in Nigeria.

On 24 December 2013, Mikaya died at Black Lion Hospital from complications of systematic lupus erythematosus. In 2018, her second album, Gize Binegudim, was released posthumously by Minew Shewa Records.

== Life and career ==
Mikaya Behailu was born on May 30, 1977, in Addis Ababa. She grew up with a love for both literature and music, excelling at Bethlehem and Abyot Kirs schools. She later earned a degree in literature from Addis Ababa University in 2004. Before entering the music world, Mikaya taught at various schools in Addis Ababa, including School of Tomorrow and Addis International. She was reportedly working on her master's degree at the time of her death.

Her passion for music started during her early years when she used to play the guitar and sing at her school. She started writing song lyrics in high school. Her continued attempts to release an album were unsuccessful because of inexperience and financial limitations. However, her struggles bore fruit and her debut album, Shemametew, was released in 2007, produced by the renowned Elias Melka. She wrote the lyrics of 8 of the tracks featured in the album. The album received tremendous acclaim, highlighted by a 2009 nomination at the Kora Music Awards.

A second album, Gize Binegudm, was released posthumously by Minew Shewa Records in January 2018. She wrote the lyrics of all 12 tracks of the album, and various artists were involved in the mixing and arrangements.

== Death ==
In September 2013, Mikaya was diagnosed with systemic lupus erythematous, a chronic autoimmune disease, and was on follow up. On 24 December 2013, Mikaya was rushed to Black Lion Hospital but passed away a few hours before midnight. She was said to be working to launch a talk show that solely focused on women issues.

== Discography ==
Title	Year	Label
Shemametew	2007	Nahom Records
Gize Binegudim	2018	Minew Shewa Records
