= 2027 United Nations Climate Change Conference =

32nd UN climate conference

- Part of United Nations Climate Change Conference
- Location: Addis Ababa, Ethiopia; 9.024093°N 38.851166°E
- Also known as: COP32
- Previous event: Antalya 2026
- Next event: 2028 United Nations Climate Change Conference

The 2027 United Nations Climate Change Conference or Conference of the Parties to the UNFCCC, more commonly known as COP32, is the upcoming 32nd session of the United Nations Climate Change Conference, to be held in Addis Ababa, Ethiopia.

== Background ==
The African Group of countries will provide the COP presidency. On 5 March 2025, Nigeria announced to the UN climate chief Simon Stiell its decision to bid to host COP32 in Lagos in 2027, highlighting its leadership in climate action and readiness to host the summit.

On the second day of COP 30, it was announced at plenary that Ethiopia had secured the endorsement of the African Group to host the COP in 2027. Ethiopia presented Addis Ababa as a better fit in regards to infrastructure and capacity, and Nigeria accepted the proposal.

== See also ==
- Climate change in Ethiopia
