= 1974 in Ethiopia =

- Decades: 1950s; 1960s; 1970s; 1980s; 1990s
- See also: Other events of 1974; Timeline of Ethiopian history

The following lists events that happened during 1974 in Ethiopia.

== Incumbents ==
- Emperor: Haile Selassie I (until 12 September), Amha Selassie (starting 12 September)
- Prime Minister:
  - until 1 March: Aklilu Habte-Wold
  - 1 March-22 July: Endelkachew Makonnen
  - 22 July-3 August: vacant
  - 3 August-12 September: Mikael Imru
  - starting 12 September: post abolished

== Events ==
=== Ethiopian Revolution ===
- 12 January – the Ethiopian Revolution begun when Ethiopian soldiers rebelled in Negele Borana.
- 18 February – Nationwide protests surged in Addis Ababa by students, teachers, workers, taxi drivers and white collar workers.
- 28 April – by order of Haile Selassie asked Prime Minister Aklilu Habte-Wold to resign from office and instead installed liberal aristocrat Endelkachew Mekonnen as the new prime minister.
- June – the Coordinating Committee of the Armed Forces, also known as the Derg, established to seize the power of the emperor.
- 22 July – Endalkachew resigned replaced by Mikael Imru, a progressive aristocrat.
- 1 August – Endalkachew was arrested by the Derg.
- 12 September – Coup d'état of Haile Selassie resulted his imprisonment at National Palace in Addis Ababa, stayed until his death on 27 August 1975.

== Deaths ==
- 23 November -
  - Aklilu Habte-Wold
  - Akale Work Hapte-Wold
  - Aman Mikael Andom
  - Endelkachew Makonnen
