= Eyasu Berhe =

Ethiopian musician (1956–2010)

Eyasu Berhe ኢያሱ በርሀ
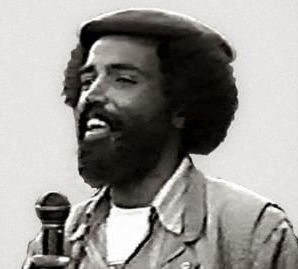

Background information
- Born: 11 June 1956; Mekelle, Tigray Province, Ethiopian Empire
- Origin: Tigray Region, Ethiopia
- Died: 18 January 2010 (aged 53) Alamata, Tigray Region, Ethiopia
- Occupations: Singer; Songwriter; Composer; Lyricist; TPLF fighter
- Years active: 1980s–2010

Eyasu Berhe Asemahegne (Tigrinya: ኢያሱ በርሀ አሰማኅኝ; 11 June 1956 – 18 January 2010) was a Tigrayan singer, songwriter, composer, lyricist, poet, producer, cultural activist and veteran member of the Tigray People’s Liberation Front (TPLF). He is widely recognized as one of the most influential and beloved figures in modern Tigrigna music and cultural history, especially in the Tigray Region.

== Early life ==
Eyasu was born on 11 June 1956 in Mekelle, in the Tigray Province of the Ethiopian Empire. He attended local primary and secondary schools, where he was exposed to Tigrigna poetry and the region’s musical heritage. Later in life, he obtained his MA degree from Open University of the United Kingdom in Business Administration and was studying for his PhD.

== Music career ==
During the Ethiopian Civil War, Eyasu joined the Tigray People’s Liberation Front (TPLF) cultural troupe, using his talents as a poet, composer, and vocalist to create powerful songs that inspired and mobilized support for the movement.

Through music, Eyasu played significant role in mobilizing the public for the bitter struggle and spired many young men and women to join the organisation. It is said that his compositions—estimated to comprise 70–80 percent of the troupe’s repertoire—blended poetic depth with political and social themes, helping to galvanize local and diaspora support.

A tribute on TigraiOnline lauds him as "the veteran TPLF fighter and renowned artist" whose cultural leadership “single‑handedly transformed and led the revival of our dying culture.” He also served as a coordinator, trainer and artistic director mentoring younger members and shaping the sound and message of revolutionary Tigrigna music.

=== Artistic style and influence ===
A multi‑talented artist, Eyasu combined lyrical poetry with traditional Tigrigna melodies and lyrical poetry with modern arrangements, making his music both emotionally powerful and culturally resonant. His songs addressed themes of resistance, national identity, social justice, and cultural pride, and they became anthems of both the liberation struggle and Tigrayan cultural expression. His legacy as a poet and songwriter also influenced diaspora communities, where his music continues to be performed and commemorated.

== Death and legacy ==
On 18 January 2010, Eyasu died unexpectedly of a heart attack while performing onstage in Alamata, Tigray Region, at the age of 53. A condolence letter from the TDA San Diego Chapter described him as “a beloved son of all people” who “did not die in bed” but lived heroically, and “has gained martyrs’ respect ... the highest monument that will remain erected in our hearts forever.”

In April 2010, the Tigray Development Association announced plans to build a memorial library in Mekelle in his honor, at an estimated cost of 11 million Ethiopian Birr, underlining his enduring cultural importance.
