= Millennium Hall (Addis Ababa) =

Multi-purpose venue in Addis Ababa, Ethiopia

- ሚሌኒየም አዳራሽ
- Interactive map of Millennium Hall
- Location: Airport Road, Addis Ababa, Ethiopia
- Coordinates: 8.989679562805795°N 38.789178685061586°E
- Owner: Addis Park Development and Management PLC
- Type: Multipurpose venue
- Parking: 4

Construction
- Built: 2006; 20 years ago

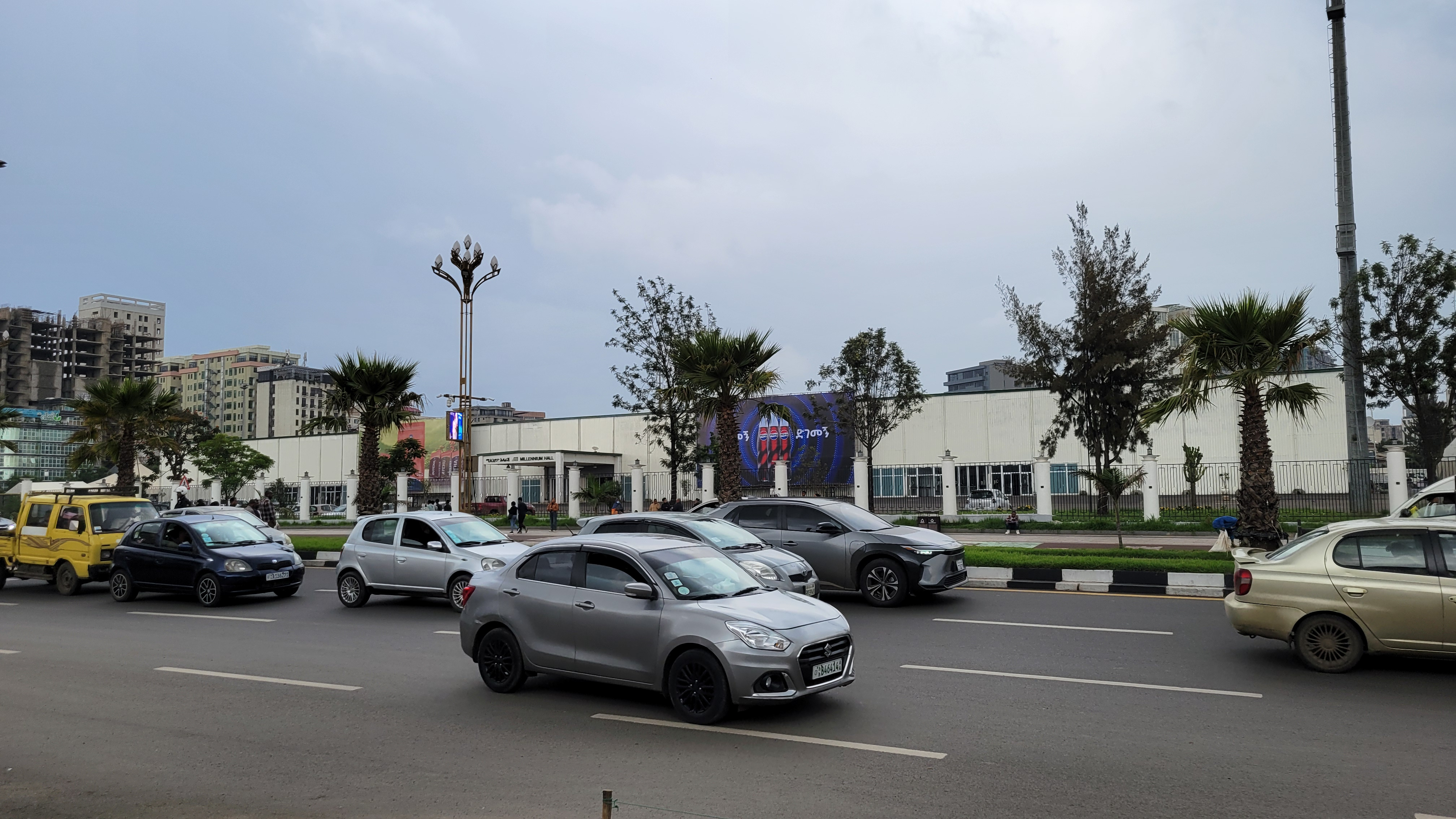
Millennium Hall

Millennium Hall (Amharic: ሚሌኒየም አዳራሽ) is a venue located in Addis Ababa, Ethiopia. Built in 2006 by Sheikh Mohammed Hussein Ali Al Amoudi, it is a multi-purpose facility hosting variety events, including conferences, cultural performance and religious gatherings.

== History ==
Millennium Hall was built by Ethiopian-born Saudi businessman Mohammed Hussein Ali Al Amoudi in 2006. It is managed by Addis Park Development and Management PLC, a private company established in 2004. The hall occupies 87,000 sqm of land, with 19,000 sqm indoor space offering an expo hall stretched up to 5,000 sqm, 4 conference rooms, parking spaces, and 24/7 security service. For concerts and other entertainment purposes, lighting and a sound system are also installed.

On 11 September 2007, the hall hosted concerts coinciding with the Ethiopian third millennium. In April 2020, the Ministry of Health announced the hall would be converted to a makeshift hospital for 1,000 patients during the COVID-19 pandemic.
