= Betoch =

Ethiopian sitcom

- Genre: Sitcom
- Created by: Tilahun Gugsa
- Starring: Tilahun Gugsa; Yalemwork Animut; Nitsu Haile; Maekda Haile; Fikadu Fasil; Ashenafi Mehalet; Melat Tesfaye; Nibret Gelaw
- Theme music composer: Tilahun Gugsa Productions
- Opening theme: "Betoch" voiced by Tilahun Gugsa
- Country of origin: Ethiopia
- Original language: Amharic
- No. of episodes: 409

Production
- Executive producer: Tilahun Gugsa
- Production locations: Addis Ababa, Ethiopia
- Camera setup: Multi-camera
- Running time: 20–30 minutes
- Production company: Tilahun Gugsa Productions

Original release
- Network: EBC
- Release: 12 January 2013 – present

Betoch ([bé to chə]; Amharic: ቤቶች, lit. 'Houses') is an Ethiopian family sitcom starring Tilahun Gugsa airs on EBC (formerly ETV) since 2013. The series airs every Saturday and focuses on a middle class family living in Addis Ababa.

It gained wide popularity among the broader Ethiopian public as it was the first sitcom ever aired in the country.

== Premise ==
Character Zeru (Tilahun Gugsa) is a patriarch who manages his whole family from financial problems and crisis, trying to make his family in the appropriate situation that is necessary to their life. His wife Azalu (Makda Haile) has knowledge about law, treating her children in a fair way. They live with their four children: Meraf (Gelila Raesom), Bezabe (Fikadu Fasil), Erestae (Melat Tesfaye), and Yebekal (Ashenafi Mehalet). Although the series is comedic in nature, it does touch on serious subjects from time to time, such as corruption.

== Casts and characters ==
Actor	Character	Seasons							
Actor	Character	1	2	3	4	5	6	7	8
Tilahun Gugsa	Zeru (ዘሩ)	Main	Main	Main	Main	Main	Main	Main	Main
Makda Haile	Azalech (አዛለች)	Main	Main	Main	Main	Main	Main	Main	Main
Gelila Raesom	Marfee (ማፊ)	Main	Main	Main	Main	Main	Main	Main	Main
Ashenafi Mehalet	Yebekal (ይበቃል)	Main	Main	Main	Main	Main	Main	Main	Main
Fikadu Fasil	Bezabeh (በዛብህ)	Main	Main	Main	Main	Main	Main	Main	Main
Melat Tesfaye	Erestae (እርስቴ)	Main	Main	Main	Main	Main	Main	Main	Main
Nitsu Haile	Shashe (ሻሼ)	Main	Main	Main	Main	Main	Main	Main	Main
Nibret Gelaw	Eke (እከ)	Main	Main	Main	Main	Main	Main	Main	Main
Seble Tefera*	Tirfe (ትርፌ)* Deceased	Main	Main	Main	Main	Main	No Appearance	No Appearance	No Appearance
Assefa Tegegn	Basha (ባሻ)	Recurring	Recurring	Recurring	Recurring	Recurring	Recurring	Recurring	Recurring
Bisrat Gebretsadek	Na (ና)	No Appearance	No Appearance	No Appearance	No Appearance	No Appearance	No Appearance	Main	Main
