= Ashebir Woldegiorgis =

Ethiopian politician

Ashebir Woldegiorgis is a member of the Ethiopian parliament and former president of the Ethiopian Football Federation. He is notable as he is the sole independent in the EPDRF-dominated chamber, representing the Bonga constituency. He defeated the head of the Prime Minister's Office and Cabinet Affairs Minister Berhanu Adelo, one of only two EPRDF candidates to be defeated in the 2010 election.
