= 2007 Ethiopian presidential election =

- 9 October 2007
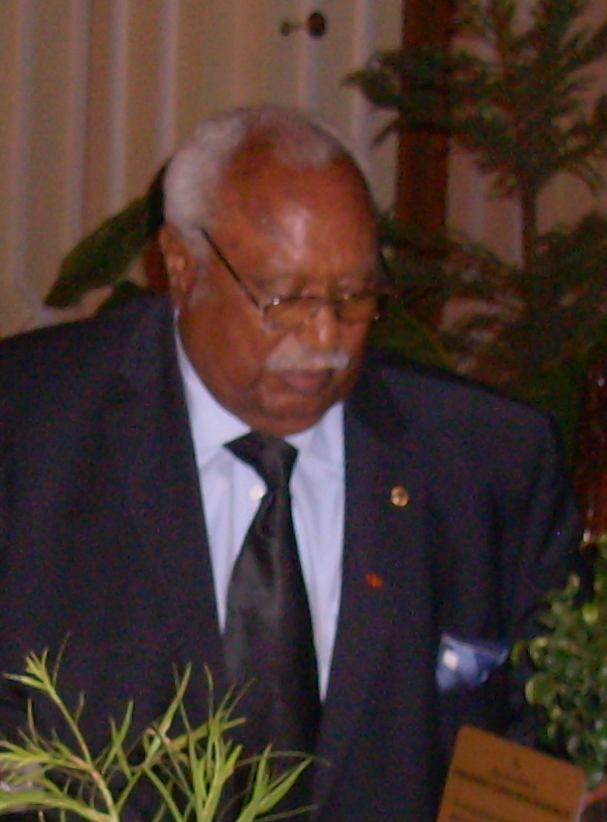
| Nominee | Girma Wolde-Giorgis |
| Party | Independent |
| Electoral vote | 430 |
President before election
Girma Wolde-Giorgis
Independent
Elected President
Girma Wolde-Giorgis
Independent

Indirect presidential elections were held in Ethiopia on October 9, 2007, in which the Ethiopian Parliament re-elected Girma Woldegiorgis for a second six-year term. He was first elected by the upper house, the House of Federation, before being elected by the lower house, the House of Peoples' Representatives, with 430 votes in favor, 88 against, and 11 abstaining.
