= Black Lion Hospital =

Hospital in Addis Ababa, Ethiopia

Black Lion Hospital Tikur Anbessa Hospital

Geography
- Location: Addis Ababa, Ethiopia
- Coordinates: 9.0201364°N 38.7499589°E

Organisation
- Type: Specialist

Services
- Beds: 700
- Speciality: 400 doctors 900 nurses 200 health professionals

History
- Opened: 1964

Black Lion Hospital or Tikur Anbessa Hospital (Amharic: ጥቁር አንበሳ ሆስፒታል) is a specialized hospital in Addis Ababa, Ethiopia, established in 1964. It is a main teaching hospital for both preclinical and clinical training of most disciplines in the School of Medicine of Addis Ababa University. It offers specialized clinical service that is now compiled with both the public and private medical institutions in Ethiopia.

== Overview ==
Black Lion Hospital was established in 1964. It has 200 doctors, 700 beds, 379 nurses and 115 other health professionals offering health care services. The hospital consists of 950 permanent contract administrative staffs that supports the hospital activities.

Under School of Medicine, the hospital spans various departments, faculties and residents. The Department of Orthopedic Surgery is the main department of the hospital founded on 25 September 1987 as the leading orthopedic center in the country. It staffed 16 consultant surgeons and 16 residents in training. On 3 December 2022, the hospital planned to construct its own private hospital. The decision is to seek autonomy from the federal government and establish its own financial assets. It covers 15 hectares of land for hospital expansion.
