= Semahegn Belew =

Ethiopian singer (1967–2026)

Semahegn Belew ሰማኸኝ በለዉ

Background information
- Also known as: Seme Balageru
- Born: 27 September 1967; Bahir Dar, Ethiopian Empire
- Died: 15 June 2026 (aged 58) Addis Ababa, Ethiopia
- Genres: Ethiopian music
- Instrument: Vocals
- Years active: 1981–2026
- Labels: Electra Music Shop; Nahom Records Inc.; Sima Trading Plc.; Zefens
- Spouse: Gebeyanesh Abate (m. 1990)

Semahegn Belew (Amharic: ሰማኸኝ በለዉ; 27 September 1967 – 15 June 2026), also known as Seme Balageru (Amharic: ሰሜ ባላገሩ), was an Ethiopian singer from Bahir Dar, Amhara Region. He was primarily known for his traditional Gojjam songs, "Antuyewa", "Wuba Bahir Dar", and "Debot Ensra".

== Biography ==
Semahegn Belew was born in Bahir Dar on 27 September 1967. At the age of 14, around 1981, he began his career as vocalist before moving to Addis Ababa in 1990. He became popular for his traditional Gojjam songs, blending them with Bati and Ambassel, along with modern one. In the wake of his popularity, Semahegn was nicknamed Seme Balageru for performing in traditional farming attire and showcasing Ethiopian rural heritage.

Semahegn released notable hits like "Antuyewa", "Wuba Bahir Dar", and "Debot Ensra". Semahegn was known for his constant stage appearances, loud vocal singing and revered as "a man of profound integrity". In 1999, Semahegn was sentenced to four years over alleged tragic car accident. He was on tour in the United States while he was charged; instead of fleeing, he returned to Addis Ababa Bole International Airport to surrender. Aside from music, Semahegn was profound philanthropist involved to elderly care associations, regional patriotic initiatives, and the Grand Ethiopian Renaissance Dam (GERD).

Semahegn married Gebeyanesh Abate in 1990 and they had four sons.

== Death ==
Semahegn died on 15 June 2026 after being rushed to nearest hospital. He was buried at the Bole Bulbula Debre Medhanit Medhanealem Church in Addis Ababa on 16 June, surrounded by family members, relatives, prominent members and fans.

== Discography ==
- Ethiopian Cultural Songs (2000)
