= 1960 in Ethiopia =

- Decades: 1940s; 1950s; 1960s; 1970s; 1980s
- See also: Other events of 1960; Timeline of Ethiopian history

The following lists events that happened during 1960 in Ethiopia.

== Incumbents ==
- Emperor: Haile Selassie I
- Prime Minister: Abebe Aregai (until 17 December), Imru Haile Selassie (17 December-20 December)

== Events ==
=== July ===
- July 10 - The Eritrean Liberation Front was founded, with the goal of liberating Eritrea from the rule of Ethiopia.

=== December ===
- December 13 - While Emperor Haile Selassie I of Ethiopia was visiting Brazil, his Imperial Bodyguard staged a coup d'etat, taking many of the Imperial staff hostage, including Crown Prince Asfa Wossen, who was proclaimed as King (rather than Emperor). The coup failed within a few days, and Haile Selassie reigned as emperor until another coup in 1974.
