= 2008 Negele Boran bombings =

Terrorist attack in Oromia Region, Ethiopia

2008 Ethiopia Ngelle Borena bombing
- Location: Negele Boran, Ethiopia
- Date: 28 May 2008 (UTC+3)
- Attack type: Bombing
- Deaths: 3
- Injuries: 5
- Perpetrator: Somali militants (suspected)

The 2008 Ethiopia Negele Boran bombings were two bombings on the night of 28 May 2008 at two hotels in the town of Negele Boran in the Oromia Region of Ethiopia which killed 3 and injured 5. The two bombs were detonated 3 minutes apart: the first exploded in the Kidane Mihret Hotel and the second in the Shuferoch hotel, just a few yards away.

This attack occurred on the 17th anniversary of Meles Zenawis overthrow of Mengistu Haile Mariams former military government, the Derg. Although the Ethiopian government has not officially confirmed the perpetrators, a Mogadishu-based Somali radio station, Radio Shebelle, broadcast a statement by the leader of a Somali militant group, which said the explosions were aimed at "the Ethiopians, the enemy of Islam".
