= 2024 Ethiopian presidential election =

- 7 October 2024
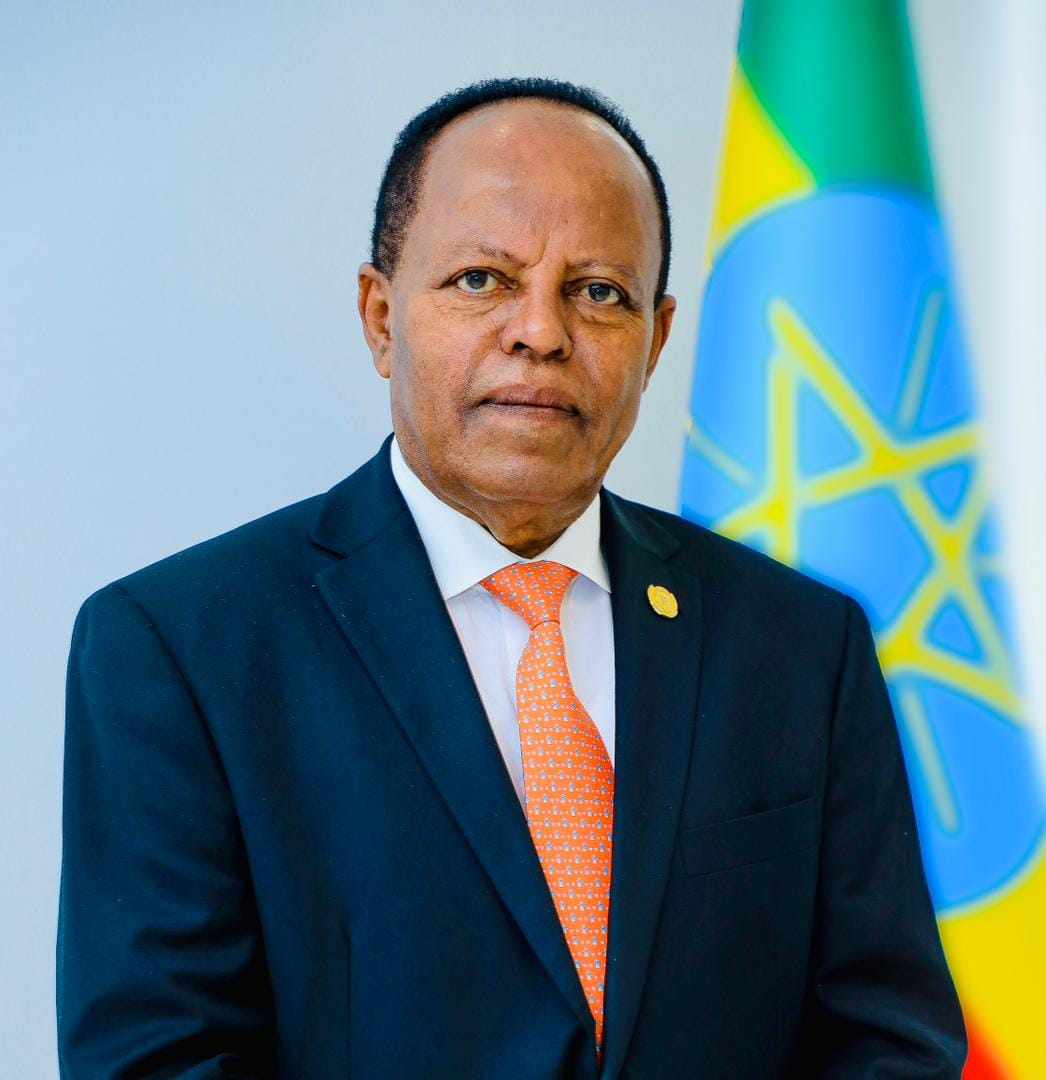
Nominee	Taye Atske Selassie
Party	Independent
Electoral vote	Unopposed
President before election
Sahle-Work Zewde
Independent
Elected President
Taye Atske Selassie
Independent

A presidential election was held in Ethiopia on 7 October 2024 to elect its next president.

Diplomat and outgoing minister of foreign affairs Taye Atske Selassie was elected without contest to a six-year term amid tensions between former president Sahle-Work Zewde and prime minister Abiy Ahmed.

== Electoral process ==
A presidential candidate is required to be elected by a joint session of the House of Federation and the House of Peoples' Representatives, the upper house and lower house of the Ethiopian parliament, the Federal Parliamentary Assembly, respectively.
