= Ethiopian third millennium =

New Year event for third millennium in Ethiopia in 2007

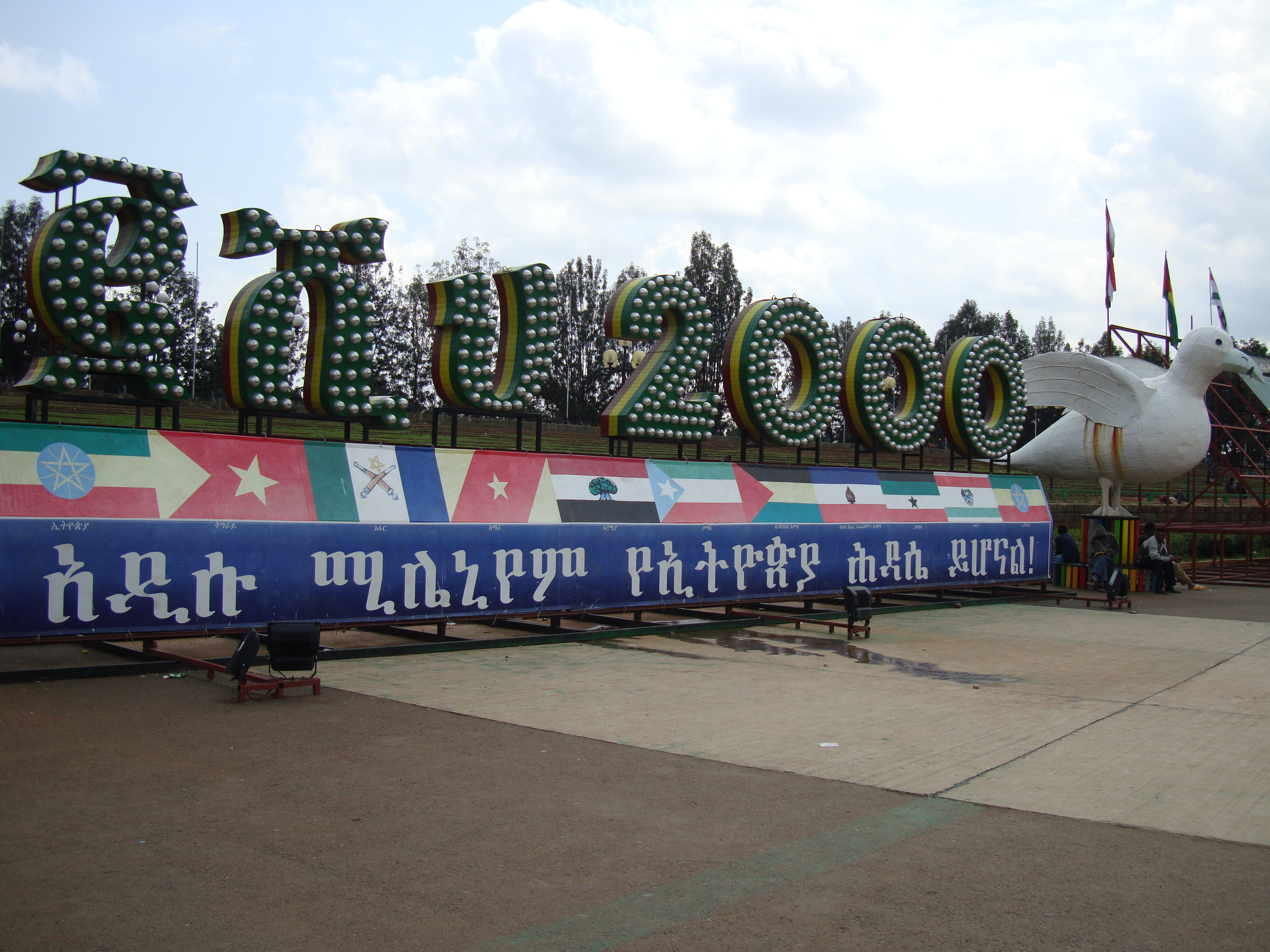
- A letter sign reads as "፪ሺህ 2000" at Meskel Square
- Date: 11 September 2007
- Venue: Millennium Hall; Meskel Square
- Location: Ethiopia
- Organized by: Ethiopian Music Association

The Ethiopian third millennium (Amharic: የኢትዮጵያ ሶስተኛው ሚሌኒየም), also frequently called the Ethiopian Millennium, was a New Year event in Ethiopia celebrating the transition to third millennium in the Ethiopian calendar, on 11 September 2007. The event regarded as the beginning of renaissance of Ethiopia, marked by numerous goals and achievements from people and the government. Coinciding the event, the government initiated the project known as the Millennium Dam, later renamed as the Grand Ethiopian Renaissance Dam (GERD), which started its operation in 2011.

Concert hall were held at Millennium Hall in Addis Ababa with tickets were more than $150, accommodating for 20,000. The concerted was attended by famous celebrities and the American musical band the Black Eyed Peas performed for the first time in Ethiopia. It was financed by Saudi billionaire Mohammed al-Amoudi, who sponsored associated concerts. Banks, airlines and major businesses still used the Gregorian date, and did not add six hours.

== Goals and achievements ==
The Ethiopian calendar used to reckon time in a seven to eight years difference with the Gregorian calendar – used in accordance with the Ethiopian calendar. The events widely conceived as the renovation of Ethiopia's ethnic components, and there was multi-direction guerrilla movement against the Tigray People's Liberation Front (TPLF).

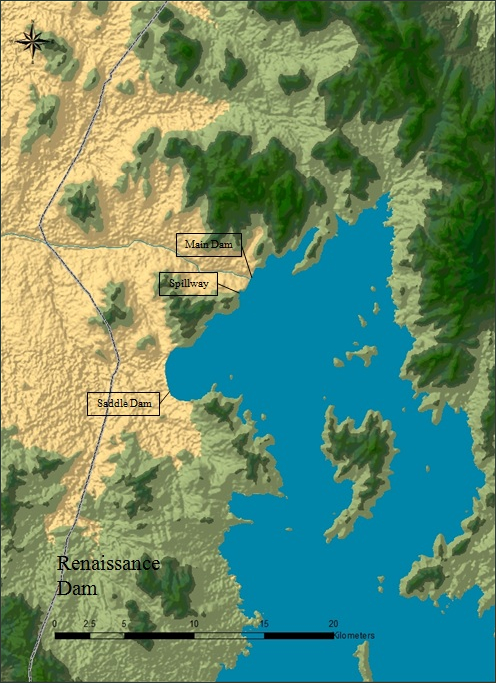
The Grand Ethiopian Renaissance Dam, which was started construction in 2011, coincided in the millennium event

The government regarded the "millennium project", emphasizing the importance of ethnic groups into "unity and diversity". Aside from this, the event was a precedent of Millennium Dam, which later renamed as Hidase Dam or the Grand Ethiopian Renaissance Dam (GERD) started construction in 2011.

== Event ==
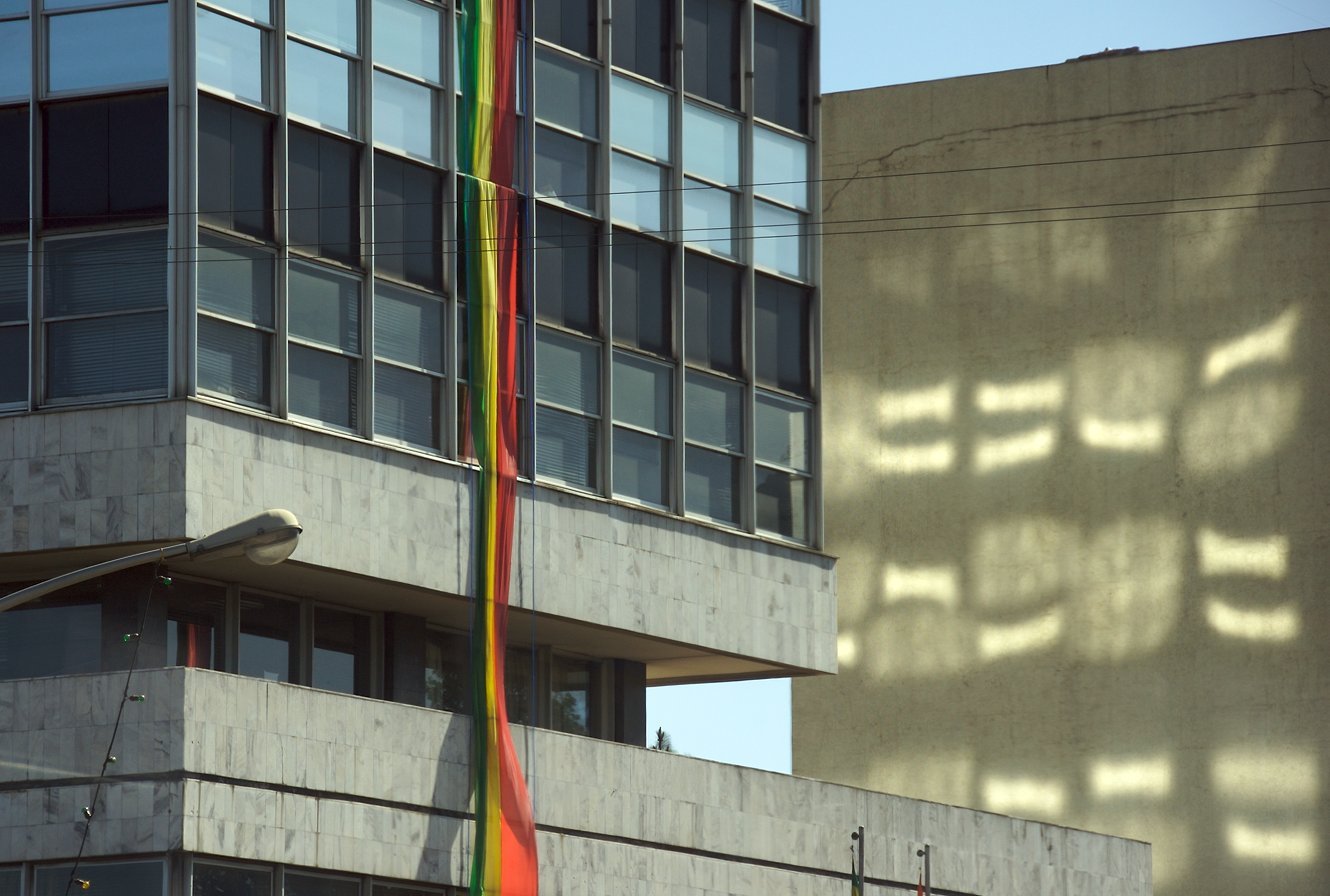
Clothes with color of Ethiopia dropped in a building

The Ethiopian third millennium was celebrated on Wednesday, 11 September 2007 adorned with cultural celebration and concerts in Addis Ababa and other cities in Ethiopia. In Addis Ababa, the millennium festival was held in Millennium Hall, accommodate for 20,000 people. The ticket prices of the celebration were more than $150, nearly twice the average salary of Ethiopia – met a controversy as many people complained about the high value. It was broadcast nationwide on state television. According to the Minister of Sport Eshete Gossaye, large display television would be set up in large stadiums and Meskel Square. The concert hall was financed by Saudi billionaire Mohammed al-Amoudi, who sponsored various concerts. Neighboring countries' head of state except Eritrea were attended. The headline event was opened by famous American musical group The Black Eyed Peas, performing the first time in the country.

People were seen reading newspapers, and internet forums, as well as communicating with friends and colleagues. Parties were held in every locale that went on for days, and many residents came across streets to socialize. 10 kilometers Millennium Run, for which 35,000 people signed up, was scrapped – as was a big food festival. There was also a sharp increase of staple food prices that depressed many Ethiopians, and many Ethiopian expatriates have failed to reach their homeland for celebration. Hotel and airline booking unlikely achieved the desired expectations.

Banks, airlines and major businesses used the Gregorian date, and did not add six hours.
