= Seble Tefera =

Ethiopian actress (1976–2015)

- ሰብለ ተፈራ
- Born: 24 August 1976; Addis Ababa, Ethiopia
- Died: 12 September 2015 (aged 39); Addis Ababa, Ethiopia
- Education: Addis Ababa University
- Occupation: Actress
- Years active: 2005–2015
- Television: Betoch
- Spouse: Moges Tesfaye

Seble Tefera (Amharic: ሰብለ ተፈራ; 24 August 1976 – 12 September 2015) was an Ethiopian actress. She has worked primarily in comedy films and sketch comedy. Seble was known for portraying as "Terfe" in the 2013 sitcom Betoch.

== Life and career ==
Seble Tefera was born on 24 August 1976 in Addis Ababa, Ethiopia. She completed high school at Nefas Silk Comprehensive Secondary High School and attended Addis Ababa University in department of Theatrical Arts.

Seble notably played as "Emama Chebe" in a radio program called Tininish Tsehayoch that broadcast in Fana Broadcasting Corporate from 2009 to 2014. She was known for roles in various comedy films, notably in Yarefede Arada (2014), co-starring with Shewaferaw Desalegn.

In 2013, she widely gained prominence for playing as "Terfe" in a 2013 sitcom Betoch as housemaid.

== Personal life and death ==
Seble was married to Moges Tesfaye, but had no children.

On 12 September 2015, Seble was killed by car crash while she was travelling in Addis Ababa with her husband in the Ethiopian New Year. Seble was on board with her husband in the front seat of Toyota Vitz car, which collided with a parked truck in an area commonly called Saris. She died as a result of the impact from ejection to windshield. On 15 September, Seble's funeral took place at the Holy Trinity Cathedral with notable people and her relatives present.

== Filmography ==
Film
Title	Year	Character
Che Belew	2005	
Che Belew 2	2007	
Fenji Woreda	2009	
Elizabel	2011	
Hulet LeAnd	2011	
Hewan Endewaza	2012	
Yarefede Arada	2014	Demerech

Television
Title	Year	Character
Betoch	2013–2015	Terfe

Radio
Title	Year	Character
Tininish Tsehayoch	2009–2014	Emama Chebe
