= 2016 Ethiopian flood =

Multiple floods in 2016 in Ethiopia

- Date: 6 April 2016
- Location: Ethiopia
- Deaths: 202+

In 2016, deadly floods hit Ethiopia, leaving at least 200 people dead and over 200,000 people homeless as seasonal rains come early to the country. The majority of these deaths occurred in the city of Jijiga while elsewhere, heavy downpours of rain were reported with more floods expected in the next few days. The floods are reportedly at higher levels than other flood travesties than that of previous years.

== Background ==
=== Flood Events in Ethiopia ===
Ethiopia has extensive experience in flash floods and river floods. The identified historical flood event years (1988, 1996, 1998, 2006, 2010, 2012, and 2016) in the country were also known as La Niήa episodes.

=== Flood Area Description ===
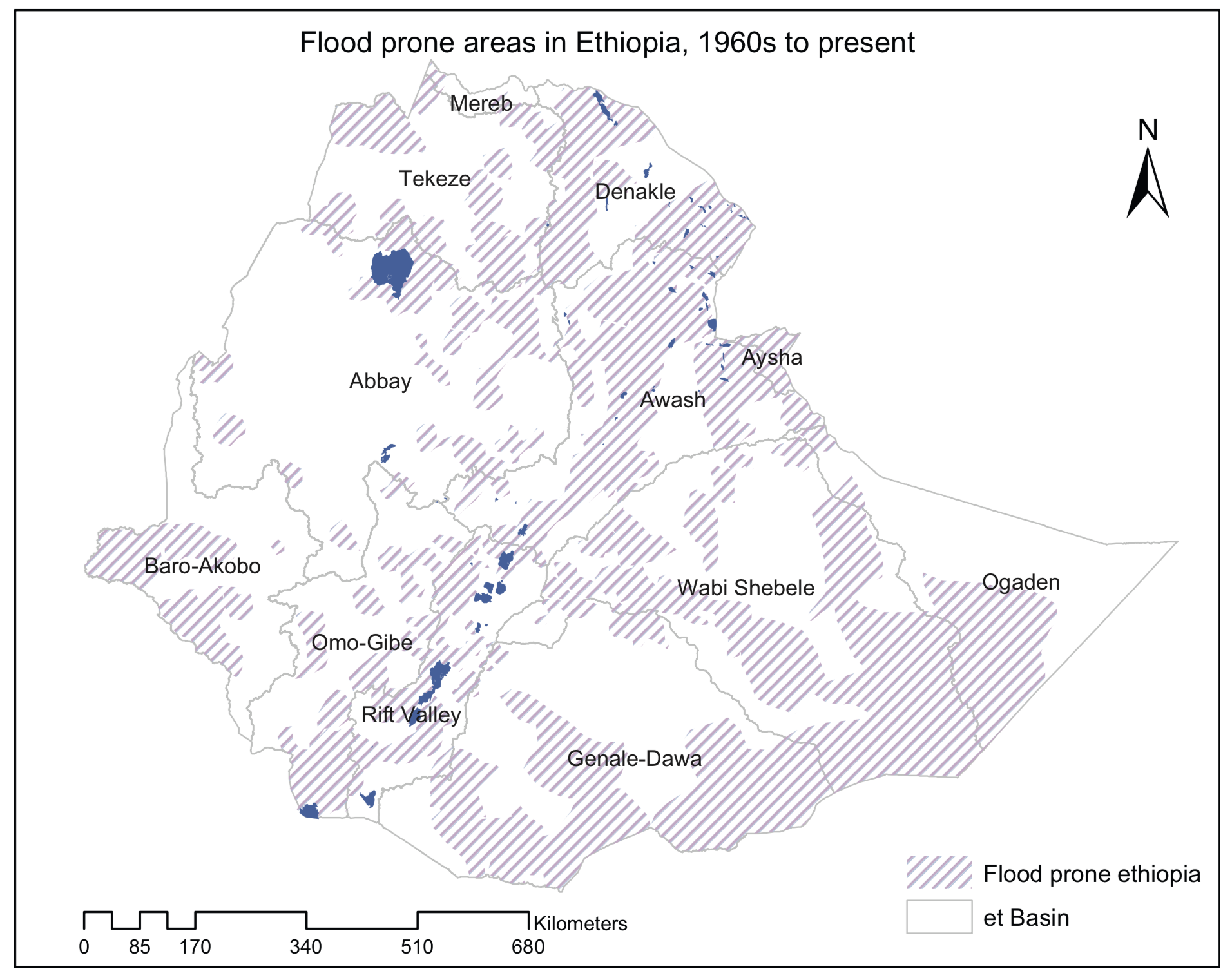
Basin map of Ethiopia with flood-prone extents.

Ethiopia has 12 basins, of which 8 are basins, 1 is a lake basin with perennial rivers and 3 are dry basins. Most major rivers are of a transboundary nature and cross-border. Many parts of these river basins are affected by prominent flash floods and river floods.

=== State of Flood ===
The characteristics of heavy precipitation and distribution, as well as the preconditions of hydrological variables (soil moisture content, groundwater and surface water level), play an important role in the physical change of flood influence factors.

=== Climate and the Flood ===
Typically, La Nina events are associated with higher-than-normal rainfall between June and September in central and highland Ethiopia, leading to flooding. Commonly, these La Nina events in Ethiopia were preceded by the drought effects of El Nino events.

- The El Nino phenomenon
- La Nina episodes

=== 2016 Ethiopia Flood ===
In 2016, some areas in the Horn of Africa experienced flood events following the 2015 El Nino (drought) events. In Ethiopia, the 2016 flood event occurred with heavy Kiremt rains and caused many localized flash floods, landslides, and overflowing of rivers in Lower Omo Valley, Dire Dawa, Amhara, Afar, Somali, Tigray, Gambella, Oromia, and Harari regions.

== Geographical and Physical Impact ==
Thousands of individuals living within the flooded areas have little shelter or food and are exposed to terrible weather, with the danger of contracting diseases. The floods have also killed livestock and destroyed large areas of farmland.

=== Impacts on Water Resources ===
According to NAPA (2011), the water resources sector will be affected by climate change through a decrease in river run-off, a decrease in energy production, as well as increased floods and droughts. Consequently, the ecosystem, which is the source of rain and water resource, will be affected. Rainwater scarcity would affect the aquatic life by deteriorating the quality and quantity of a water body.

=== Impacts on Food Availability ===
Because of irregular rainfall and droughts the country is experiencing deficits in food production in several areas, and likely increase in acute weather events, amplified aridity and a decrease in precipitation, range resources and soil moisture will escalate the situation. The availability of food has become a major bottleneck for millions of households in many parts of Ethiopia due to the repeated drought cycles and disparity in rainfall. Agro-pastoral and pastoral households, which are reliant on livestock for their livelihoods, also suffer severe asset losses during droughts.

=== Impacts on Settlement and Infrastructure ===
Climate variability, including extreme events such as storms, floods and sustained droughts, has marked impacts on settlements and infrastructure. Indeed, for urban planners, the biggest threats to localized population concentrations posed by climate variability and change are often expected to be from little-characterized and unpredictable rapid-onset disasters such as storm surges, flash floods and tropical cyclones (Freeman, 2003). Negative impacts of climate change could create a new set of refugees, who may migrate into new settlements, seek new livelihoods and place additional demands on infrastructure (IPCC, 2007).

== Direct Impact of Floods in Ethiopia ==
Floods in Ethiopia have direct environmental and socio-economic impacts; these include the impact of pollution on the environment and the socio-economic impact of damage to people's homes and economic property.

=== Casualties to People and Property ===
According to statistics, nearly 20,000 families were displaced in Ethiopia in 2016 due to floods and unusual disasters that occurred in various parts of the country. Heavy rains triggered floods and landslides in Oromia and the southern part of the country, resulting in at least 202 deaths. More than 1,000 cattle were also killed and 559 hectares of crops were damaged.

=== Exacerbating the Consequences of Drought ===
The drought and floods of the same year affected almost all sectors in Ethiopia, with the loss of crops and livestock and the impact of reduced water resources being significant. Among them, the Tigray, Afar and Somali regions were severely affected, as the drought caused the death of almost 50% of the livestock in the region and affected 24%, 25% and 21% of the population respectively.

=== Contributing to the Spread of Disease ===
Floods in Ethiopia often lead to infectious diseases, vector-borne diseases, malnutrition, mental health problems and damage to health infrastructure. Floods exacerbate the spread of diarrhoeal diseases due to poor sanitation, inadequate water supply and poor monitoring and detection. At the same time, floods have had a direct impact on the epidemiological pattern of malaria in Ethiopia because they create many breeding grounds for mosquitoes.

== Health Impacts on Ethiopians ==
The onslaught of floods poses a serious threat to the health of Ethiopians. Examples include direct deaths, injuries, infectious diseases, non-communicable diseases, psychosocial health and malnutrition.

=== Short-term Impact: Bacterial Growth ===
During floods, the state of the environment is altered after heavy precipitation, for example, temperature, humidity and surface vegetation. These changes may favor the growth of pathogens. As a result, pathogens may spread rapidly through contaminated water. As well as because of the difficulty of access to clean water already clean sanitation facilities clean water and improved sanitation, the rate of disease transmission increases again.

==== Acute Watery Diarrhea & Malaria ====
The problem of acute watery diarrhea after the floods was exacerbated by the dense population, destruction of water facilities, and limited sanitation. In times of flooding, people may be forced to drink non-clean water (e.g. contaminated surface water) to survive. Water is often contaminated with harmful substances such as human and animal excreta and animal carcasses from upstream, making these infectious diseases very vulnerable to outbreaks.

==== Malnutrition ====
Ethiopia has high malnutrition rates, especially among children, with 46% stunting. The crops and floods suffered from food shortage in the region after the floods, leading to malnutrition among the people.

=== Long-term Impact: Immune-deficiency in Residents ===
Malnutrition and diarrheal mortality are inextricably linked. This is a vicious circle because malnutrition leads to deficiencies in the immune system, and conversely diarrhea leads to malnutrition because of reduced energy intake and malabsorption. The potential for waterborne diseases is also exacerbated by the reduced physical strength of the population due to food shortages and limited temporary living conditions, as well as the degradation of turbid drinking water. The poorer and more backward countries need time to rebuild after the disaster, and the healthy living standard of the Ethiopian people cannot be guaranteed in time.

== Response ==
=== Local Response ===
The National Disaster Risk Management Commission (NDRMCC) acted in a leading role. National humanitarian actors mainly include the Ethiopian Red Cross Society (ERCS), the National Flood Task Forces (FTF), National Meteorological Agency (NMA), Ethiopia Humanitarian Country Team (EHCT), Ethiopia Humanitarian Fund (EHF) and other National Society branches.

ERCS was responsible for supporting NDRMC by dispatching NFI stocks (emergency shelter and household kits) to affected regions(see Table 1) and setting up quick assessment teams within risk areas, and also monitored NMA’s weather forecasts and basic health status among communities with the help of National Society branches.

Table 1: Distribution of 800 partial NFI kits (blankets, sleeping mats, body soap, laundry soap, tarpaulins, kitchen utensils)
Regions	Woredas	Date	Number of NFI kits
Somali	Jijiga	8 April	200 HH kits (full)
Oromia	Arsi	24 April	200 HH kits
SNNPR	Gurage	25 April	200 HH kits
SNNPR	Silita	26 April	200 HH kits

In April 2016, a Flood Alert was released by the FTF to remind people of the seriousness of the flood risk.

On 2 September 2016, a joint plan was issued by the EHCT to help deal with acute watery diarrhoea (AWD) in Ethiopia, with the EHF allocating 5.4 million dollars in response to the funding requirements of AWD.

=== International Response ===
Red Cross Red Crescent Movement partners including IFRC, ICRC, Austrian RC, Swiss RC, Spanish RC, Canada RC, NLRC, and Swedish RC and other partner organizations including IOM, UNICEF, IRC, Save the children international (SCI) and Government of Ethiopia (GoE) participated in response to this disaster positively. They actively reported these up-to-date risks and corresponding supports and IFRC, ICRC and PNSs participated in coordination meetings regularly.

== Lessons Learned from the Disaster ==
=== Early Warning and Response Analysis ===
In early April 2016, National Disaster Risk Management Commission (NDRMC), Early Warning and Response Directorate warned that flood is likely to happen in flood-prone areas with high probability in the southern and south-eastern parts. Additionally, a flash flood is anticipated in the northeastern, central and eastern parts of the country. Taking into consideration the presence of the El Niño effect with anticipated above-normal rains in the belg season, the risk of flash and river flood is high. To remind that the concerned personnel should undertake appropriate measures ahead of time in order to minimize the effect of flood hazards in the areas.

NDRMC has reached 258,136 MAM children and women in priority-2 woredas of the country. Therefore, Early warning and response analysis from NDRMC can productively contribute to reducing the negative influence of disasters.

=== Improving the Water Conservancy Facilities for Farmland ===
In some areas, the expected heavy falls would favour the season's agricultural activities, particularly for long cycle crops. Actually, the concerned department and farmers could take appropriate measures in order to make use of the expected moisture efficiently.

Therefore, the Ethiopian Government is planning to construct two new dams to mitigate Ethiopia’s devastating and recurring floods in the second half of 2016. The decision comes just a few months after flash floods ravaged the country, causing as many as one hundred fatalities and displacing tens of thousands of people. It is also one of the important lessons brought by the flood disaster to Ethiopians.

=== Challenge of Humanitarian Fund in Financial Requirements ===
The Ethiopia Humanitarian Fund (EHF) was instrumental in the overall response, supporting Humanitarian Country Team (HCT) endorsed strategies and priorities developed by cluster/sector task forces. In 2016, The AWD outbreak was exacerbated due to flooding in April–May that affected 480,000 people, of whom 190,000 were displaced. In addition, other endemic diseases compounded pressure on an already overstretched health system. Overall, some 3.6 million people in Ethiopia were in need of emergency health interventions.

Financial requirements remained high across all sectors throughout 2016. The total requirement of the Humanitarian Requirements Document (HRD) was revised. Inadequate funding poses challenges to effective humanitarian. Therefore, Ethiopia Humanitarian Fund may require further support in the future.
