= Death and state funeral of Meles Zenawi =

2012 death and funeral of the Prime Minister of Ethiopia

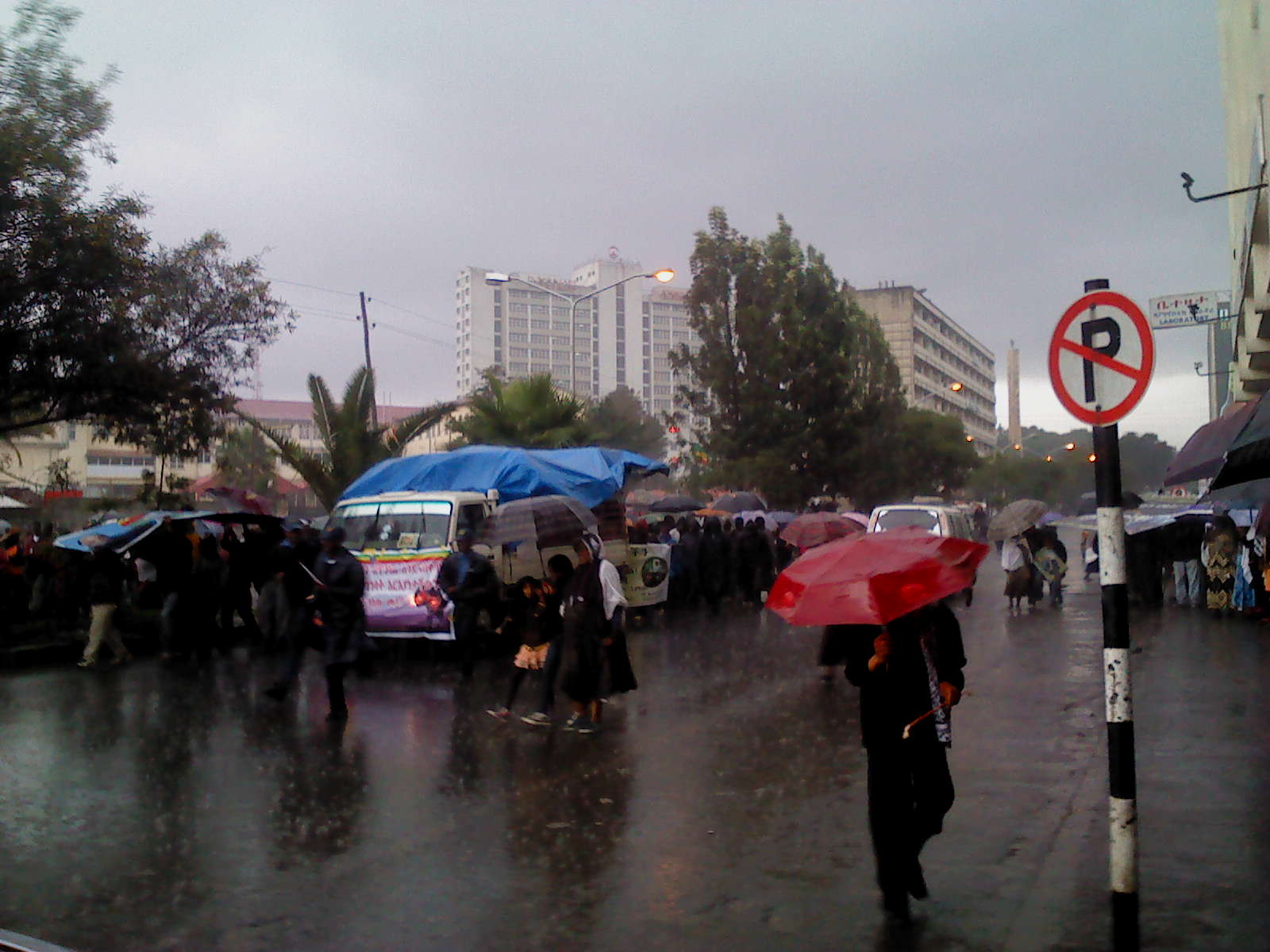
- State funeral procession in Addis Ababa
- Date: 20 August 2012 (death); 2 September 2012 (state funeral)
- Location: Brussels, Belgium (death) Addis Ababa, Ethiopia (state funeral); 9.030799°N 38.766562°E

Meles Zenawi, who led Ethiopia as Prime Minister since 1995, and served as chairman of the Ethiopian People's Revolutionary Democratic Front (EPRDF) since 1988, died in office on 20 August 2012. He had not appeared in public for a month prior to his death. It was speculated that he was in poor health and he was expected to recover before Enkutatash, the Ethiopian New Year on 11 September 2012.

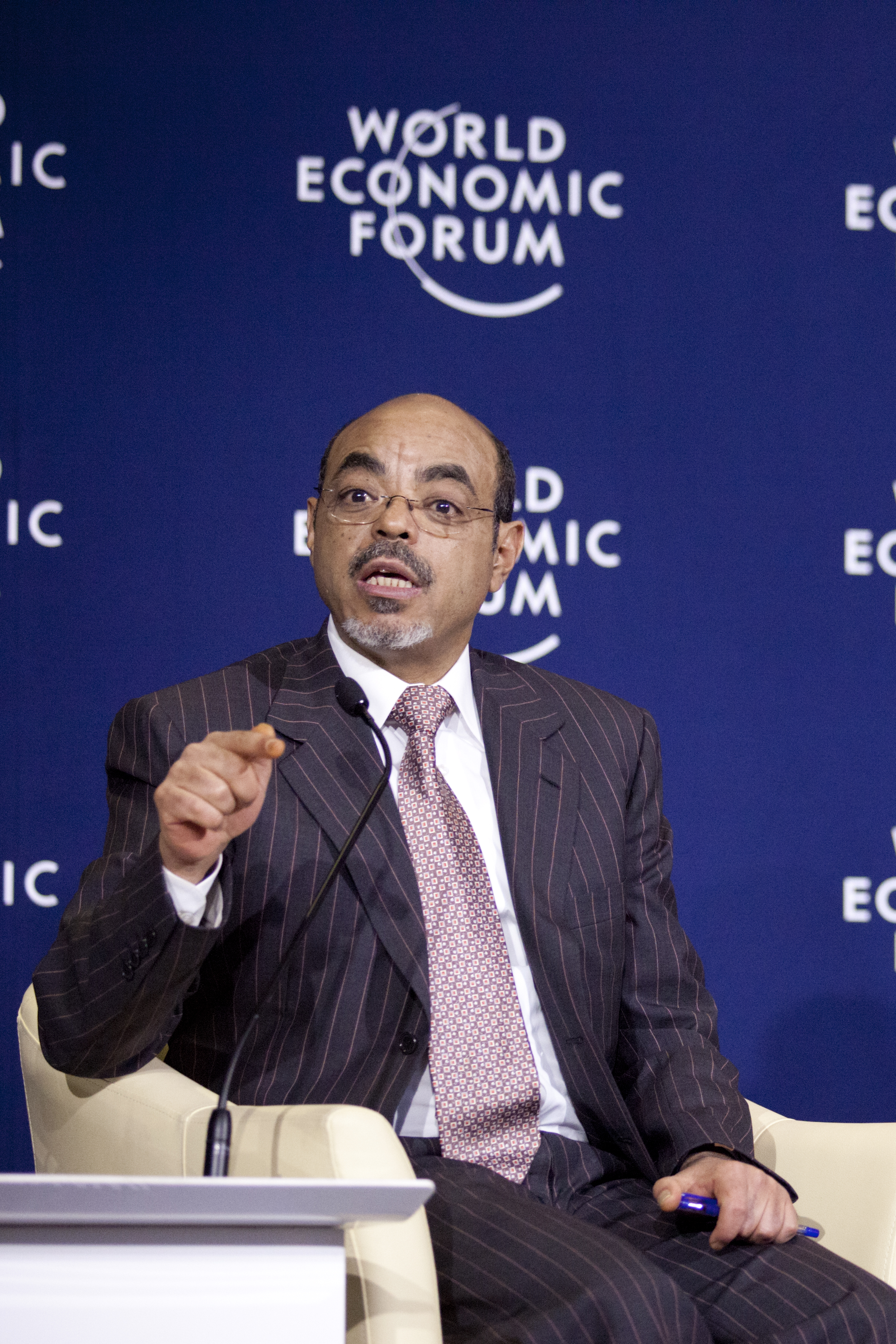
Meles Zenawi at World Economic Forum on Africa 2012.

His state funeral took place on 2 September with high-profile political figures from around the world, including 20 African leaders and senior US officials such as US Ambassador Susan Rice attending.

== Illness and death ==
Meles died from an undisclosed illness. His ill health was not known publicly until an EU Commission spokesperson broke the news in Brussels, Belgium, following surgery for a secondary infection. Meles had not been seen in public for weeks and speculation mounted after he missed a summit in Addis Ababa the month pror. Meles' death was announced on state television on 21 August, where Bereket Simon, the Ministry of Information, read the following announcement:

It's a sad day for Ethiopia, the man who led our country for the past 21 years and brought economic and democratic changes, has died. We have lost our respected leader. Meles has been receiving treatment abroad. He was getting better and we were expecting him to return to Addis Ababa. But he developed a sudden infection and died around 11:40 pm last night. His body will be returned to Ethiopia soon. We have set up a committee to organize his funeral. More information will be released about that soon.

State television ETV announced that "Prime Minister Zenawi suddenly passed away last night. Meles was recovering in a hospital overseas for the past two months, but died of a sudden infection at 11.40."

Furthermore, he also announced:

As per Ethiopian law, Hailemariam Desalegn has now taken over the leadership. He will also be in charge of the Ethiopian military and all other government institutions. I would like to stress, nothing in Ethiopia will change. The government will continue. Our policies and institutions will continue. Nothing will change in Ethiopia. Desalegn will be confirmed by parliament.

Speaking to Voice of Americas' Somali Service, Bereket did not mention where Meles died and did not disclose the illness that led to his hospitalization.

Meles was last seen in June and Western officials suspected that he died from liver cancer. But in mid-July, Bereket claimed that Meles was in good condition saying that he is "very good and stable" and that he was just "taking some rest". The purportedly most recent images of Meles show him thinner and he failed to attend an African Union meeting in Addis Ababa. Meles was expected to recover before the Ethiopian New Year on 11 September. Some analysts claimed that Meles died as a result of catecholamine after a verbal attack by Ethiopian journalist Abebe Gelaw.

== Funeral ==
On the night of 21 August, the coffin containing Meles body arrived at Bole International Airport in Addis Ababa from Brussels, where a crowd of thousands of people – including politicians – were waiting to receive the coffin. Meles state funeral was conducted on 2 September with thousands of mourners gathering near Meskel Square to pay tribute. According to Ethiopian officials, the state funeral was attended by hundreds of political and public figures from around the world, most of them African leaders, including South African President Jacob Zuma and Sudanese President Omar al-Bashir. Among regional leaders, President Jacob Zuma praised Meles and said Ethiopia lost "a patriot and a visionary".

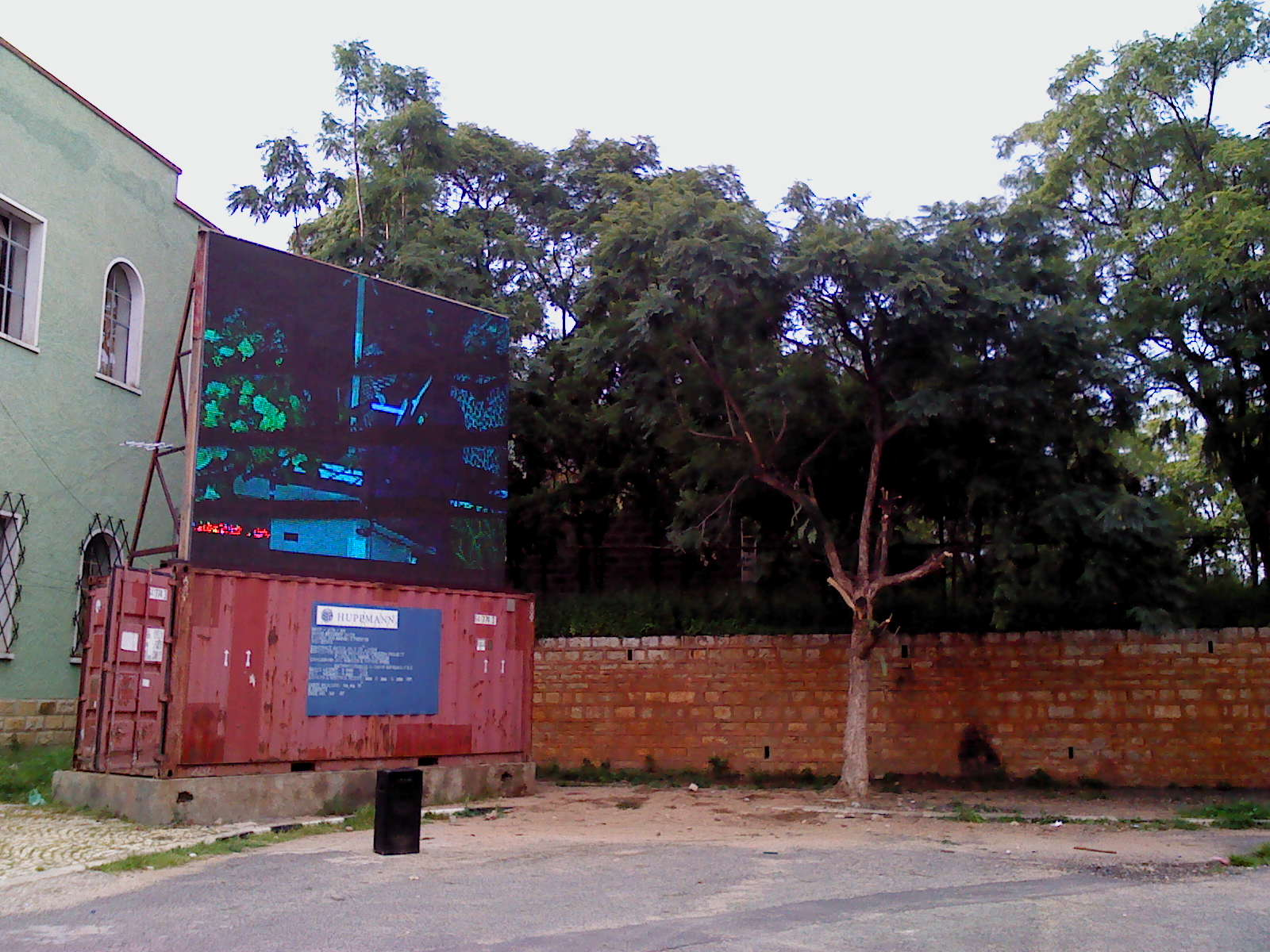
Live broadcast of the funeral in Harar via public space television

Posters, pictures and quotes of Meles were displayed on every street in Addis Ababa. The casket arrived at the National Palace, where the flag-draped coffin was put on display. The coffin, adorned by flowers and draped in the national flag was then placed on a black carriage. Afterward, the casket was slowly drawn to Meskel Square by horses, where thousands of people waited to pay tribute. The funeral ceremony included military bands and religious leaders. The body then was transported in a motorcade to Holy Trinity Cathedral. Mourners were seen waving flags and some wept as they listened to then Prime Minister-elect Hailemariam Desalegn and other US officials' speeches. The casket was interred and the grave covered with stone slabs, as wailing crowds jostled around the burial site. The coffin was accompanied by hundreds of mourners and Meles' wife Azeb Mesfin, who was seen being comforted by officials.

== Reactions ==
Assefa Seifu, a critic of Meles' government, called him "a devil incarnate". Kenyan Prime Minister Raila Odinga expressed his condolences: "We need a seamless, peaceful, transition of power. The region, the horn of Africa, needs stability."

- Olympic gold medalist and Ethiopian national Haile Gebrselassie praised Meles' achievements.
- Rwandan President Paul Kagame: "His was a life of immense courage, vision and enterprise which he devoted to the advancement of his fellow citizens in this country and across Africa."
- US Ambassador to the U.N Susan Rice described Meles as "unpretentious and direct".
- UN Contemporary United Nations Secretary-General Ban Ki-moon praised Meles' "exceptional leadership."
- Israeli Prime Minister Benjamin Netanyahu's office issued a statement that read: "[Netanyahu] presented his condolences to the Ethiopian people. Meles was loved in his country. He was also a true friend of Israel. During his mandate, Ethiopia became one of Israel's closest friends."
- UK Prime Minister David Cameron called Meles "an inspirational spokesman for Africa."
- US President Barack Obama recognised Meles for his "lifelong contribution to Ethiopia’s development, particularly his unyielding commitment to Ethiopia’s poor."
- South Korean President Lee Myung-bak released this statement: "The passing of Prime Minister Meles is being mourned across the globe. We all have just lost a great leader of Ethiopia and a preeminent advocate for Africa and the developing world. [...] I pray for the repose of a truly bright mind who lived an intense and moving life – my close friend."

Western NGO Amnesty International called on the new administration to end Meles' "ever-increasing repression" and Human Rights Watch similarly added that the next administration should repeal the 2009 anti-terrorism law. As The New York Times questioned a gap between the United States of America's strategic and ideological goals in relation to its support for Meles' government, it quoted HRW researcher Leslie Lefkow as saying: "There is an opportunity here. If donors are shrewd, they will use the opportunity that this presents to push a much stronger and bolder human rights stance and need for reform." Author Dan Connell, who had interviewed Meles in June, said that "he seemed focused [then] on wrapping up a number of major projects as if he were aware the end was near. Meles knew his days were numbered." The Committee to Protect Journalists cited and criticised the secrecy around Meles' death. The Washington Post said that the "circumstances of his death remained laced with intrigue."

Regional groups responded with the Ogaden National Liberation Front saying it hoped his death "may usher [in] a new era of stability and peace" and Al Shabaab that it was celebrating the "uplifting news."
