= Ethiopian Chamber of Commerce =

Chamber of Commerce

- Ethiopian Chamber of Commerce and Sectoral Associations
- የኢትዮጵያ የንግድና ዘርፍ ማኅበራት ምክር ቤት
- Abbreviation: ECCSA
- Formation: 1947; 79 years ago
- Type: Nonprofit
- Purpose: Private sector organization
- Headquarters: Mexico Square, Chamber Building
- Location: Addis Ababa, Ethiopia
- Region served: Ethiopia
- President: Sebsib Abafira Abajobir
- Vice President: Aynalem Abayneh Mamo
- Website: ethiopianchamber.com

The Ethiopian Chamber of Commerce (Amharic: የኢትዮጵያ የንግድና ዘርፍ ማኅበራት ምክር ቤት) is a non-profit, autonomous private sector organization that is responsible for trade promotion and private sector development. It was established by the government of the Ethiopian Empire in 1947 and evolved into current state since 2003 as the Ethiopian Chamber of Commerce and Sectoral Associations (ECCSA).

== History ==
The Addis Ababa Chamber of Commerce was established in 1947 in under Proclamation No. 90/1947. In 1962, the organization renamed Ethiopian Chamber of Commerce and evolved to the Ethiopian Chamber of Commerce and Sectoral Associations (ECCSA) in 2003 under Proclamation No. 341/2003, allowing free market policy. ECCSA memberships voluntary representing various business enterprises, ranging from agriculture, manufacturing, services, and trade.
