= Eyob Mekonnen =

Ethiopian reggae singer and songwriter (1975–2013)

Background information
- Born: 12 October 1975; Jijiga, Hararghe Province, Ethiopia (now Somali Region, Ethiopia)
- Died: 18 August 2013 (aged 37) Nairobi, Kenya
- Genres: Reggae; roots music; Ethiopian music
- Occupation: Singer
- Years active: 2000–2013
- Labels: Yisakal Entertainment

Eyob Mekonnen Yalem (Amharic: እዮብ መኮንን ያለም; 12 October 1975 – 18 August 2013) was an Ethiopian reggae singer widely considered as progenitor of reggae music in Ethiopia. His songs were well known for their themes of "love, understanding, and respect".

== Early life ==
Eyob was born in Jijiga in 1975, during the start of the Ethiopian Civil War. His father, Mekonnen Yalem, was an officer in the Ethiopian Army during the Ogaden War, which was credited with inspiring him to impart peaceful messages in songs, such as "Nekchalehu" and "Negen Layew". He moved to Addis Ababa, when he was young, and attended school whilst maintaining an interest in music.

== Musical career ==
He joined a five-person band called the Zion Band, which was described as having a "reggae beat with a distinctive Ethiopian cast". The band became a fixture at popular clubs in Addis Ababa, performing opening acts for popular singers like Haileye Tadesse, who sung songs like "Song of the Dominions" (Hule Hule) and "Anthem of the Movement" (Kebetiye). His musical style was unique, not only mixing popular Amharic music with reggae, but also Oromo music, counting Ali Birra as one of his major influences, alongside Bob Marley. In December 2007, he released his first album, Ende Kal. Eyob said it took four years to make the album with the help of songwriting from Gossaye Tesfaye and Haile Roots. Although lukewarmly received by audiences at first, as it differed from the often synthesized, electronic music that had prevailed since the era of the Derg and the demise of the big bands of the Haile Selassie era. Slowly, however, the album gained a following and "great national acclaim".

His songs dealt with issues of and promoted "morality, love, peace and social consciousness", themes that made them popular and hard-hitting. In 2010, he embarked on a campaign called "Finding Peace" to help heal rifts caused by the disputes in the parliamentary elections.

In 2012, he released one single known as "Negen Layew" and Haile Root's song as featuring named "Yalalewin". He was beginning to tour abroad, particularly in Canada, Germany, and the Netherlands.

Eyob's second album Erotalehu was posthumously released in 2017.

== Illness, death and tributes ==
On 13 August 2013, Eyob suffered an ischemic stroke brought on by atrial fibrillation and entered a coma, however he was in otherwise good health. His fans and his promoter, Yisakal Entertainment, took to Facebook to post updates on his conditions and raise funds for his treatment on a page called "Let Us Pray for Eyob Mekonnen". Due to these efforts, Eyob was moved to Nairobi on 17 August, however he died on 18 August due to complications. He was credited with sparking a movement towards live music and away from so called "one man bands" and furthering the popularity of reggae and roots music in Ethiopia.

== Discography ==
Album list with singles
Ende Kal
- Released: December 2007
- Singles:
  - "Nekechalehu"
  - "Negen Layew"
  - "Yene Konjo"
  - "Yemeder Dershaye"
  - "Endatefash"
  - "Debzezesh"
  - "Yezebarekalu"
  - "Yewenetuan New"
  - "Yekuankua Felasefa"
  - "Wekil Nesh"
  - "Rekeda"
  - "Man Ende Kal"
Erotalehu
- Released: 3 January 2017
- Singles:
  - "Semahuachew"
  - "Tekekel Nesh"
  - "Anchi"
  - "Tetereche"
  - "Yegabezkuachew"
  - "Wehajira Welale"
  - "Wede Enate Bet"
  - "Man Yawekal"
  - "Tew Yalshignen"
  - "Andebete Tenager"
  - "Say"
  - "Yilef"
  - "Zim Elalehu"
  - "Endet Beye"
  - "Erotalehu"
