= List of presidents of Ethiopia =

This is a list of presidents of Ethiopia, and also a list of heads of state after the fall of the Ethiopian Empire in 1974.

Until the Ethiopian Revolution of 1974, the heads of state of Ethiopia were either emperors or regents. From the coup d'état of the Derg leading to the fall of the empire in September 1974 until March 1975, the Derg considered the crown prince Asfaw Wossen (later regnal name Amha Selassie) as the king (not emperor) and the nominal head of state – which the crown prince refused to accept. During this time, the chairmen of the Derg, the leaders of the Derg, were to be considered as acting heads of state. On 21 March 1975, the Derg military junta abolished the monarchy and fully took over. Until the establishment of the People's Democratic Republic of Ethiopia in 1987, still dominated by Derg figures, chairmen of the Derg have to be considered heads of state – but not presidents. After the fall of the Derg and the establishment of the Transitional Government of Ethiopia in 1991, the first immediate president (Meles Zenawi) has to be considered an Interim President.

Since the formal establishment of the office of president in 1987, there have been 6 official presidents. The president is the head of state of Ethiopia. The current president is Taye Atske Selassie, elected on 7 October 2024 by members of the Federal Parliamentary Assembly.

== List of officeholders ==
In the list, the chairmen of the Derg are considered to be heads of state – but are not considered to be president. Consequently, the numbering starts with the first establishment of the office of the president of Ethiopia in 1987.

No.	Portrait	Name (Birth–Death)	Term of office			Party (Coalition)	Elected
No.	Portrait	Name (Birth–Death)	Took office	Left office	Time in office	Party (Coalition)	Elected
• Derg (Provisional Military Government of Socialist Ethiopia) (1974–1987) •
Position not established (12 – 15 September 1974)
–		Lieutenant general Aman Mikael Andom (1924–1974); Acting Head of State	15 September 1974	17 November 1974 (Resigned)	63 days	Military	—
–		Major; Mengistu Haile Mariam (born 1937); Acting Head of State	17 November 1974	28 November 1974	11 days	Military	—
–		Brigadier general Tafari Benti (1921–1977)	28 November 1974	3 February 1977 X	2 years, 67 days	Military	—
–		Lieutenant colonel Mengistu Haile Mariam (born 1937)	3 February 1977	10 September 1987	10 years, 219 days	Military COPWE WPE	—
• People's Democratic Republic of Ethiopia (1987–1991) •
1		Mengistu Haile Mariam (born 1937)	10 September 1987	21 May 1991 (Resigned)	3 years, 253 days	WPE	1987
–		Tesfaye Gebre Kidan (1935–2004); Acting	21 May 1991	27 May 1991 (Deposed in civil war)	6 days	Independent	—
Vacant during the fall of the Derg regime (27 – 28 May 1991)
• Transitional Government of Ethiopia (1991–1995) •
–		Meles Zenawi (1955–2012); Interim	28 May 1991	21 August 1995	4 years, 85 days	TPLF (EPRDF)	—
• Federal Democratic Republic of Ethiopia (1995–present) •
–		Meles Zenawi (1955–2012); Interim	21 August 1995	22 August 1995	1 day	TPLF (EPRDF)	–
2		Negasso Gidada (1943–2019)	22 August 1995	8 October 2001	6 years, 47 days	ODP (EPRDF)	1995
2		Negasso Gidada (1943–2019)	22 August 1995	8 October 2001	6 years, 47 days	Independent (Note: Expelled from both the ODP party and the EPRDF coalition on 22 June 2001.)	1995
3		Girma Wolde-Giorgis (1924–2018)	8 October 2001	7 October 2013	11 years, 364 days	Independent	2001; 2007
4		Mulatu Teshome (born 1957)	7 October 2013	25 October 2018	5 years, 18 days	ODP (EPRDF)	2013
5		Sahle-Work Zewde (born 1950)	25 October 2018	7 October 2024	5 years, 348 days	Independent	2018
6		Taye Atske Selassie (born 1956)	7 October 2024	Incumbent	1 year, 326 days	Independent	2024

== See also ==
- Emperor of Ethiopia
  - List of emperors of Ethiopia
- President of Ethiopia
- Prime Minister of Ethiopia
  - List of heads of government of Ethiopia
- Rulers of Ethiopia
- Vice President of Ethiopia
