= Girma Wolde-Giorgis =

President of Ethiopia from 2001 to 2013

- ግርማ ወልደ ጊዮርጊስ
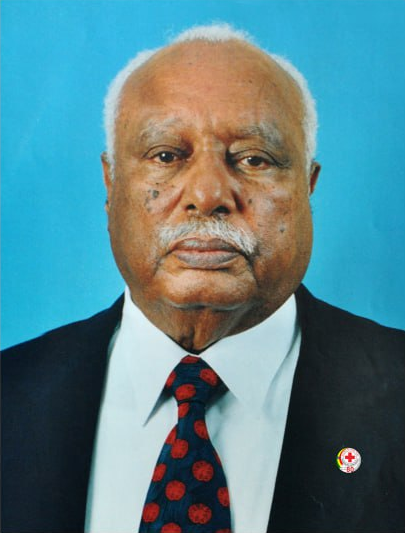

President of Ethiopia
- In office 8 October 2001 – 7 October 2013
- Prime Minister: Meles Zenawi; Hailemariam Desalegn
- Preceded by: Negasso Gidada
- Succeeded by: Mulatu Teshome

Personal details
- Born: 28 December 1924 Addis Ababa, Ethiopian Empire
- Died: 15 December 2018 (aged 93) Addis Ababa, Ethiopia
- Resting place: Holy Trinity Cathedral, Addis Ababa, Ethiopia
- Party: Independent

Girma Wolde-Giorgis (Amharic: ግርማ ወልደ ጊዮርጊስ; 28 December 1924 – 15 December 2018) was an Ethiopian politician who was the president of Ethiopia from 2001 to 2013. He was the second person to hold the office of president since the founding of the Federal Democratic Republic of Ethiopia in 1995.

== Early life ==
Girma was born on 28 December 1924 in Addis Ababa. He first attended an Ethiopian Orthodox Church school and later joined the Teferi Mekonnen School in Addis Ababa where he followed his education until the Italian invasion. The school was then renamed Scuola Principe di Piemonte (Prince of Piedmonte School) for the Crown Prince of Italy.

Between 1950 and 1952, he received certificates in management (from the Netherlands), in air traffic management (in Sweden) and air traffic control (in Canada) under a training programme sponsored by the International Civil Aviation Organization (ICAO). He was one of the first Ethiopians in the Ethiopian Air Force, which had been dominated by American technicians. Girma tried to motivate Ethiopians to join the airlines and wrote a book on fundamentals. He was an activist and at the Inter Parliamentary Summit in Yugoslavia, and he condemned the apartheid system in South Africa. Girma spoke Afan Oromo (Oromiffa), Amharic, and English fluently.

== Political career ==
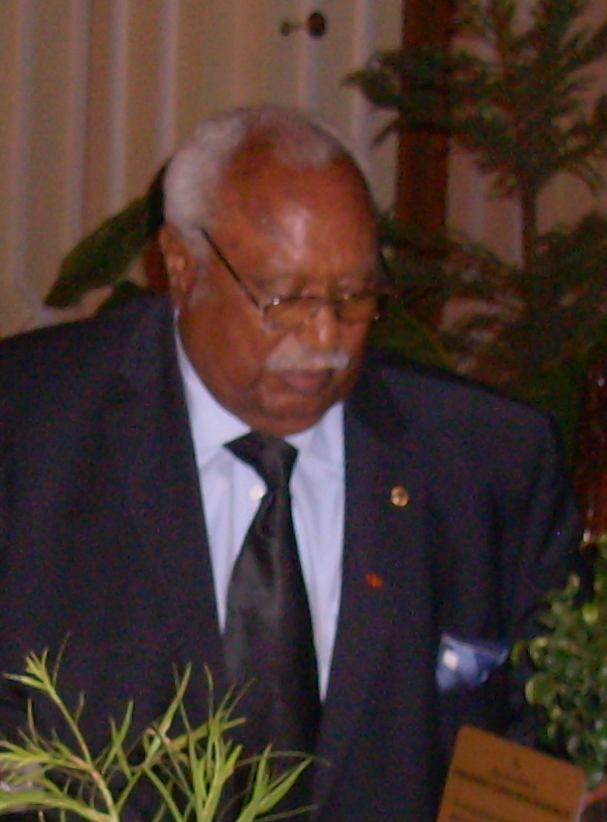
Girma in 2008

Girma was elected president on 8 October 2001, as a relatively unknown and a surprising choice, by a unanimous vote of the Ethiopian Parliament. The Ethiopian presidency is largely a symbolic office with little power. Most of the power is vested in the hands of the prime minister. Presidents serve two six-year terms. He was re-elected as president on 9 October 2007.

== Personal life ==
Girma was married and had five children. He was a member of the Ethiopian Orthodox Tewahedo Church. He was widely renowned for his usual presence at Ethiopian Orthodox Tewahedo Church Meskel Demera Festivals.

Girma died of natural causes on 15 December 2018, 13 days before his 94th birthday.

== Government service ==
- 1941: Enlisted at the Ethiopian Military Radio Communication set up by the United Kingdom
- 1944: Graduated from the Holetta Military Academy as a sub-lieutenant
- 1946: Joined the Air Force in and took various air management courses
- 1948: Became assistant teacher in air navigation and flight control
- 1951: Became director general of the Ministry of Trade, Industry and Planning at its establishment
- 1955: Became head of Civil Aviation of Eritrea (Eritrea, at the time, was part of the Federation of Ethiopia and Eritrea)
- 1957: Assumed the post of director general of the Ethiopian Civil Aviation Authority and was board member of the Ethiopian Airlines during the same period.
- 1961: Became member of the lower house (Chamber of Deputies) of the Imperial Ethiopian Parliament
- Elected speaker of the lower house (Chamber of Deputies) of the Imperial Ethiopian Parliament for three consecutive years.
- Helped win a seat for the Ethiopian Parliament in the International Parliamentary Union and attended conferences of the IPU in Switzerland, Denmark and former Yugoslavia and was elected as vice president of the 52nd Meeting of the International Parliamentary Union.
- Served as manager of the Import and Export Enterprise (IMPEX).
- Served as deputy commissioner of the Peace Programme drawn up in 1977 by the provisional military government of Ethiopia (Derg) to settle the Eritrean problem peacefully.
- 2000: Became member of the House of Peoples' Representatives of the Federal Democratic Republic of Ethiopia (FDRE) after winning in the Becho woreda constituency, Mirab Shewa Zone of the Oromia Region, as an independent candidate in the second round elections

== Experience in non-governmental offices ==
Between 1965 and 1974:

- Board member of the Ethiopian Chamber of Commerce
- Representative for Australian Trade Mission in Ethiopia
- Founder and director of the Ghibe Agricultural Association
- Founder and director of the Keffa and Illubabor Timber Processing Industry

While in the then province of Eritrea before 1990:

- President of the Ethiopian Red Cross Society – Eritrea Branch (Asmara)
- Board president of Cheshire Home
- Managing director of Leprosy Control Organization

Upon returning to Addis Ababa in 1990, he served as board member of the Ethiopian Red Cross Society and head of its International Logistics Department.

He launched an environmental protection association called Lem Ethiopia in March 1992 and has served as its vice president.

Two days before Ethiopian Christmas, on 5 January 2014 he made a clear statement on Ethiopia TV, calling for pacification between Ethiopia and Eritrea, calling it his last personal task and fight. He is coordinating from his office a group of people trying to launch peace talks, after fifteen years of disagreements, culminating in the Eritrean–Ethiopian War of 1998–2000.

== Official biography ==
Indian author Sivakumar K.P. has produced the official biography of Girma Wolde Giorgis. The book, Under the Shade of a Gaashe, was released on 15 July 2015 at the official residence of the former president. Micro Business College is the publisher of the Ethiopian edition. The author acknowledges the role of Abera Tilahun, founder and president of Micros Business College in Ambo in introducing him to the former president and financing the publishing of the book.

Political offices
Preceded by Negasso Gidada	President of Ethiopia; 2001–2013	Succeeded by Mulatu Teshome
