= Der Morgenstern ist aufgedrungen =

1587/1609 Advent/Christmas song

- Lutheran hymn
- Text: by Daniel Rumpius
- Language: German
- Melody: by Michael Praetorius
- Composed: 1609
- Published: 1587

"Der Morgenstern ist aufgedrungen" (The morning star is risen) is an Advent song and Christmas carol with lyrics by Lutheran minister Daniel Rumpius (or Rump), published first in 1587. The common melody by Michael Praetorius appeared later in 1609. It was reprinted, slightly revised by Otto Riethmüller in 1932, and is part of the current Protestant hymnal Evangelisches Gesangbuch and other song books.

== History ==
Rumpius, a Lutheran minister in Stepenitz, published the song in seven stanzas in 1587 in his Liedbüchlein, darin begriffen Lehre, Trost, Vermahnung, Beichte, Klage, Bitte, Gebete, Fürbitte, Danksagungen etc… (Song booklet, containing doctrine, consolation, admonition, confession, request, prayers, intercessions, thanksgiving etc.). He placed it in a section for Advent, titled Vermanung zur Busse auff Weihenachten… der Margaret Gammen frawen witwen auf seinen thon, which indicates that he understood Advent as a time of repentance in preparation of Christmas, and that he wrote it as an occasional song for a sick widow in distress ("kranckn betrübten Witwe").

Rump adapted the song from a secular song in Low German, a Tagelied, or wake-up-call for lovers after a night spent together. He followed the model closely in the first two stanzas. Rump introduced angels in the first stanza, to connect the call to Christmas. It is closed with a praise of the morning star as a symbol of Jesus.

The song appeared in 1925 in a collection by Wilhelm Witzke, Sechzig auserlesene deutsche Volkslieder (Sixty selected German folk songs). Otto Riethmüller published it in 1932 as an Advent song, changing the last line of the second stanza to connect the song to the metaphoric equation of Jesus as the Bridegroom, found in "Wachet auf, ruft uns die Stimme" based on the Song of Songs.

The song was included, using four stanzas, in the Protestant hymnal Evangelisches Kirchengesangbuch in the regional part for Hesse and Nassau. This version was made part of the current hymnal Evangelisches Gesangbuch in the common section as EG 69. It is associated with Epiphany, understanding the morning star as the star of Bethlehem. The hymn is contained in several other song books.

== Text ==
Rump took a folk song in Low German as a model. He wrote his lyrics in six stanzas of four lines each. Four of them became part of the hymnal Evangelisches Gesangbuch:

German current lyrics

Der Morgenstern ist aufgedrungen,
er leucht' daher zu dieser Stunde
hoch über Berg und tiefe Tal,
vor Freud singt uns der lieben Engel Schar.

Wacht auf, singt uns der Wächter Stimme
vor Freuden auf der hohen Zinne:
Wacht auf zu dieser Freudenzeit!
Der Bräut'gam kommt, nun machet euch bereit!

Christus im Himmel wohl bedachte,
wie er uns reich und selig machte
und wieder brächt ins Paradies,
darum er Gottes Himmel gar verließ.

O heilger Morgenstern, wir preisen
dich heute hoch mit frohen Weisen;
du leuchtest vielen nah und fern,
so leucht auch uns, Herr Christ, du Morgenstern!

Tagelied

De morgensterne hefft sik upgedrungen
gar schön hebben uns die Kleinen waldvögelin gesungen
wol aver berg unde depe dal,
van fröuwden singet uns de leve nachtegal.

Von fröuwden singet uns de wechter an der tinnen
weckt up den held mit sachten sinnen:
Waek up, waek up, et is wol an der tit!
Und beschütt der jungfrouwen er ere, dem helt sin junge lif.

== Melody ==
The melody in use today appeared in the collection Musae Sioniae by Michael Praetorius in 1609. It has been set by composers such as Siegfried Strohbach and Magdalene Schauss-Flake.

== See also ==
- List of Christmas carols
