= Ruth Siewert =

German opera singer (1915–2002)

- Born: Ruth Schnaudt; 1915; Viersen, North Rhine-Westphalia, Germany
- Died: July 2002 (aged 86–87); Königsfeld, Germany
- Education: Folkwangschule
- Occupation: Classical contralto

Ruth Siewert (also Rut, Sievert-Schnaudt, Sievert; 1915 – July 2002) was a German contralto and voice teacher. She performed roles by Richard Wagner at major opera houses in Europe and at the Bayreuth Festival, and was known as a singer of oratorio and Lied.

== Career ==
Born Ruth Schnaudt in Viersen, she studied voice at the Folkwangschule in Essen with her aunt, Anna Erler-Schnaudt. She made her stage debut in Bremen in 1938, but became known especially as a concert singer from 1946. She was a member of the ensemble of the Staatstheater Karlsruhe from 1955 to 1956, and of the Düsseldorf Opera from 1956 to 1959.

She performed in Wagner operas at the Bayreuth Festival, first in 1951 the role of Erda in Der Ring des Nibelungen, also the same year Schwertleite in Die Walküre, the First Norne in Götterdämmerung, later also Waltraute and Fricka in The Ring and the alto solo in Parsifal. She sang Wagner roles also at major opera houses in Europe: at the Royal Opera House in London Erda and Fricka, at La Scala in Milan Waltraute in Götterdämmerung and Erda, at the Teatro di San Carlo in Naples Erda and Fricka, at the Teatro Nuovo di Torino and at the Teatro Comunale di Bologna Erda, and at La Fenice in Venice Erda and Waltraute. She appeared as Erda, Fricka and Waltraute at the Ring Cycle of the Maggio Musicale Fiorentino. She performed Wagner roles also in Paris, Bordeaux, Nancy, Nizza and Toulouse, at La Monnaie in Brussels (Erda) and the Liceu in Barcelona.

She was known as an oratorio singer, and performed Lieder by Yrjö Kilpinen, in collaboration with the composer. She took part in a 1961 recording of Beethoven's symphonies with the Royal Philharmonic Orchestra, conducted by René Leibowitz, performing the alto solo in the Ninth alongside Inge Borkh, Richard Lewis and Ludwig Weber. Later, she worked as a voice teacher in her hometown Viersen. Siewert died in Königsfeld.

== Bibliography ==
- Kutsch, Karl-J.; Riemens, Leo, eds. (2003). "Siewert, Ruth". Großes Sängerlexikon (in German). Vol. 1 (4th ed.). Munich: K. G. Saur. p. 4397. ISBN 3-598-11598-9.
- arkivmusic.com. "Beethoven: The 9 Symphonies / Leibowitz, Royal Philharmonic Orchestra".
- Bayreuth Festival. "Ruth Siewert" (in German).
- BMLO. "Ruth Siewert". Bayerisches Musiker-Lexikon Online (in German).
- De Munt. "Erda / Das Rheingold".
