= Hadiatmo Harsojo =

Indonesian diplomat

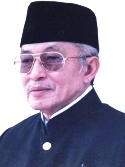

Ambassador of Indonesia to Ethiopia and Eritrea
- In office 20 October 1998 – 13 November 2002
- President: B. J. Habibie; Abdurrahman Wahid; Megawati Sukarnoputri
- Preceded by: Rochsjad Dahlan
- Succeeded by: Alwis Azizat Murad

Personal details
- Spouse: Titi Koeslandari
- Education: ??? (Drs.)

Hadiatmo Harsojo is an Indonesian career diplomat who served as ambassador to Ethiopia and Eritrea from 1998 to 2002.

== Biography ==
Hadiatmo had previously served at political section of the embassy in Singapore with the diplomatic rank of counsellor. Hadiatmo became the embassy's chargé d'affaires ad interim sometime in 1990, where he accompanied research minister B. J. Habibie for a meeting with Singapore prime minister Goh Chok Tong. Hadiatmo was later appointed as the secretary of the foreign department's policy research and development agency and the deputy chief of mission of the embassy in Riyadh. On 20 October 1998, Habibie, now the president of Indonesia, installed him as ambassador to Ethiopia and Eritrea, based in Addis Ababa. He began his duties as ambassador on 30 December 1998 and presented his credentials to president Negaso Gidada on 14 January 1999. As ambassador, Hadiatmo encouraged the Ethiopian government to draw lessons from the Indonesian government regarding development. His ambassadorial term ended on 13 November 2002.

== Personal life ==
Hadiatmo is married to Titi Koeslandari.
