= Moers =

- City
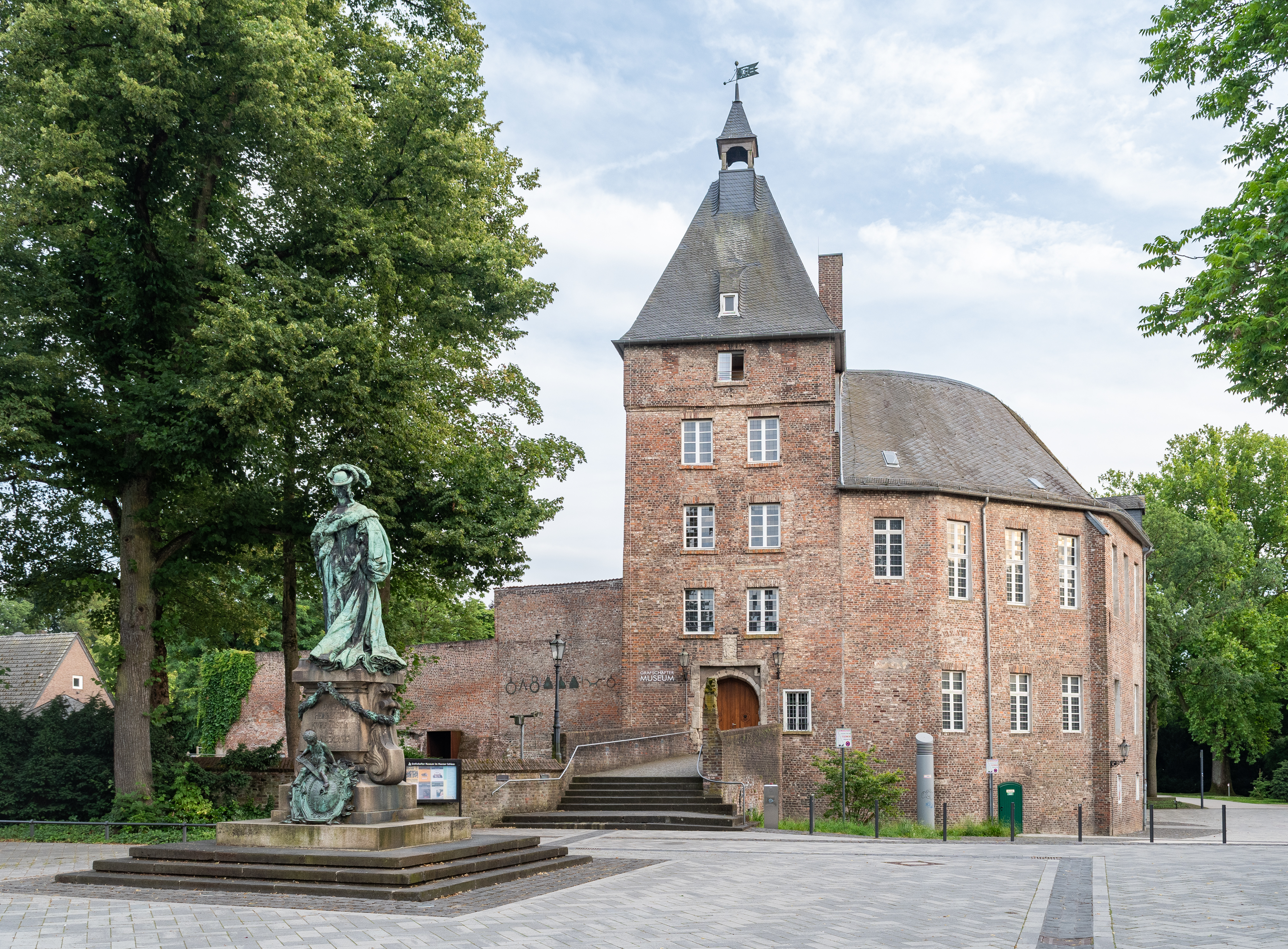
- Moers Castle (2024)

- Flag Coat of arms

- Location of Moers within Wesel district
- Interactive map of Moers
- Location within Germany Location within North Rhine-Westphalia
- Coordinates: 51°27′33″N 6°37′11″E
- Country: Germany
- State: North Rhine-Westphalia
- Admin. region: Düsseldorf
- District: Wesel
- Subdivisions: 3

Government
  - Mayor (2025–30): Julia Zupancic (CDU)

Area
  - Total: 67.68 km^{2} (26.13 sq mi)
- Elevation: 23 m (75 ft)

Population (2025-12-31)
  - Total: 101,298
  - Density: 1,497/km^{2} (3,876/sq mi)
- Time zone: UTC+01:00 (CET)
  - Summer (DST): UTC+02:00 (CEST)
- Postal codes: 47441 – 47447
- Dialling codes: 0 28 41
- Vehicle registration: MO (alternative: WES or DIN)
- Website: www.moers.de

Moers (German: [ˈmœʁs]; older form: Mörs; Dutch: Murse, Murs or Meurs) is a German city on the western bank of the Rhine, close to Duisburg. Moers belongs to the district of Wesel.

== History ==
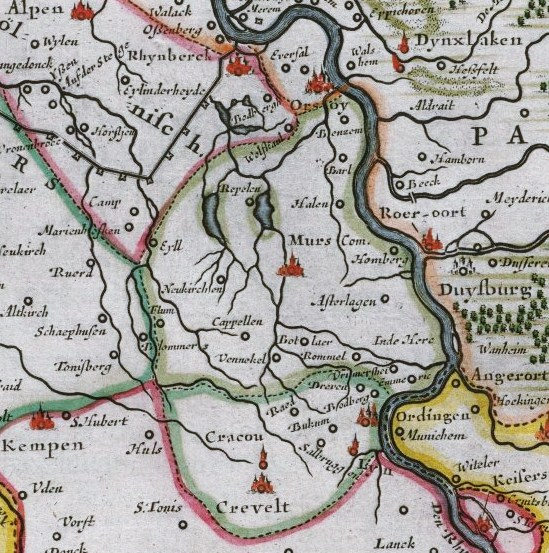
The County of Moers in 1635

Known earliest from 1186, the county of Moers was an independent principality within the Holy Roman Empire.

During the Eighty Years' War it was alternately captured by Spanish and Dutch troops, as it bordered the Upper Quarter of Guelders. During the war it finally fell to Maurice of Orange. As it was separated from the Dutch Republic by Spanish Upper Guelders it did not become an integral part of the Republic, though Dutch troops were stationed there.

After the death of William III of Orange in 1702, Moers was inherited by the king of Prussia. All Dutch troops and civil servants were expelled.

In 1795 it was annexed by France. At the Congress of Vienna, in 1815 it was returned to Prussia and in 1871 it became part of the German Empire.

A target of the Oil Campaign of World War II, the Steinkohlenbergwerke (English: coal mine) Rheinpreussen synthetic oil plant in Moers, was partially dismantled post-war.

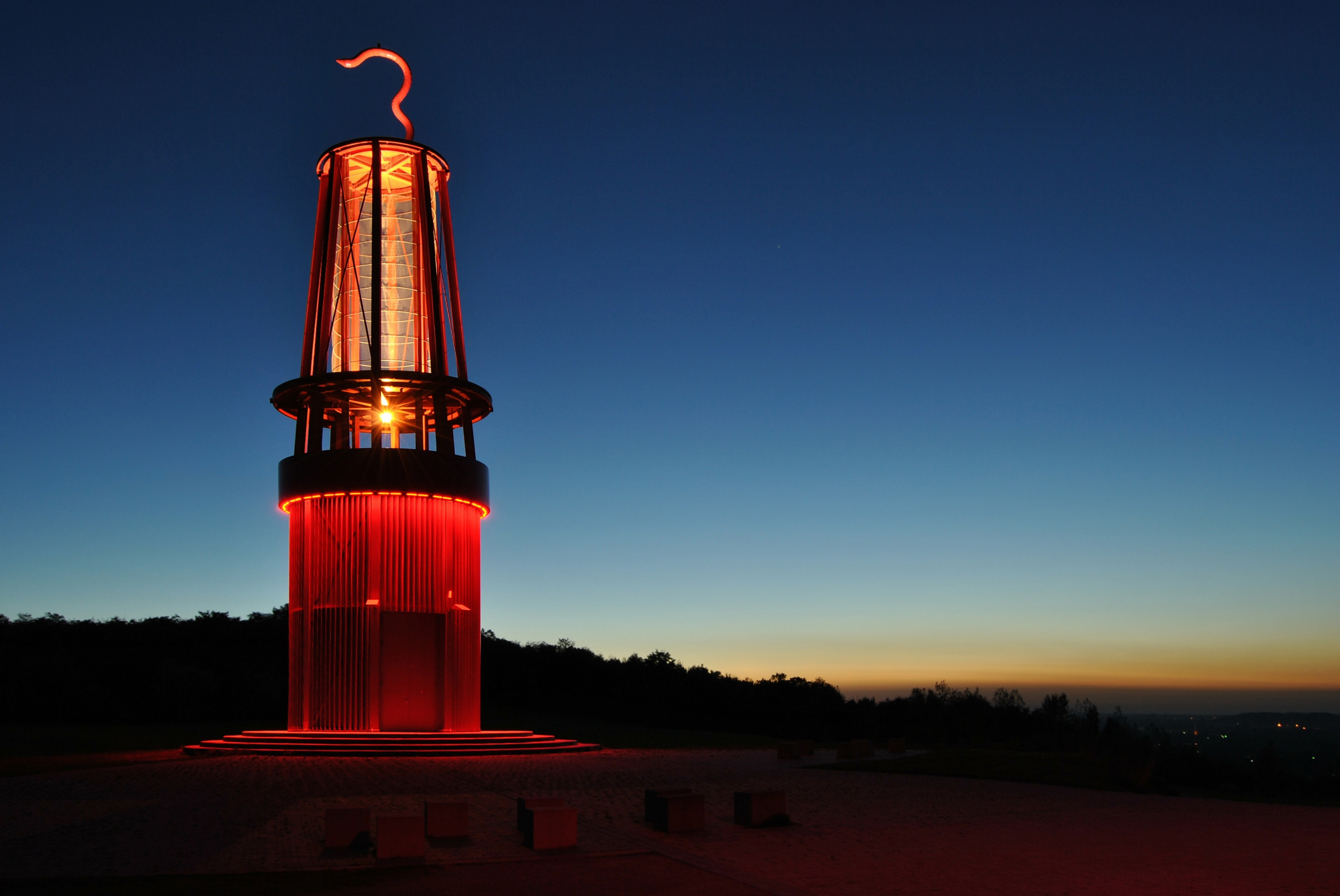
The illuminated, 30 meters high mining lamp memorial by Otto Piene on the spoil tip Halde Rheinpreußen in the north of Moers during the blue hour

== Population ==
Historical population

Year	Pop.	±% p.a.
1965	101,451	—
1970	105,617	+0.81%
1975	101,512	−0.79%
1980	99,922	−0.32%
1985	97,760	−0.44%
1990	104,595	+1.36%
1995	107,095	+0.47%

Year	Pop.	±% p.a.
2000	107,062	−0.01%
2005	107,547	+0.09%
2010	105,506	−0.38%
2015	104,529	−0.19%
2020	103,487	−0.20%
2025	101,298	−0.43%

Source: Landesdatabank Nordrhein-Westfalen

== Sports ==
In 1985, the Moers Sports Club (volleyball) was formed, winning the 1989 Bundesliga championship.

== Notable people ==
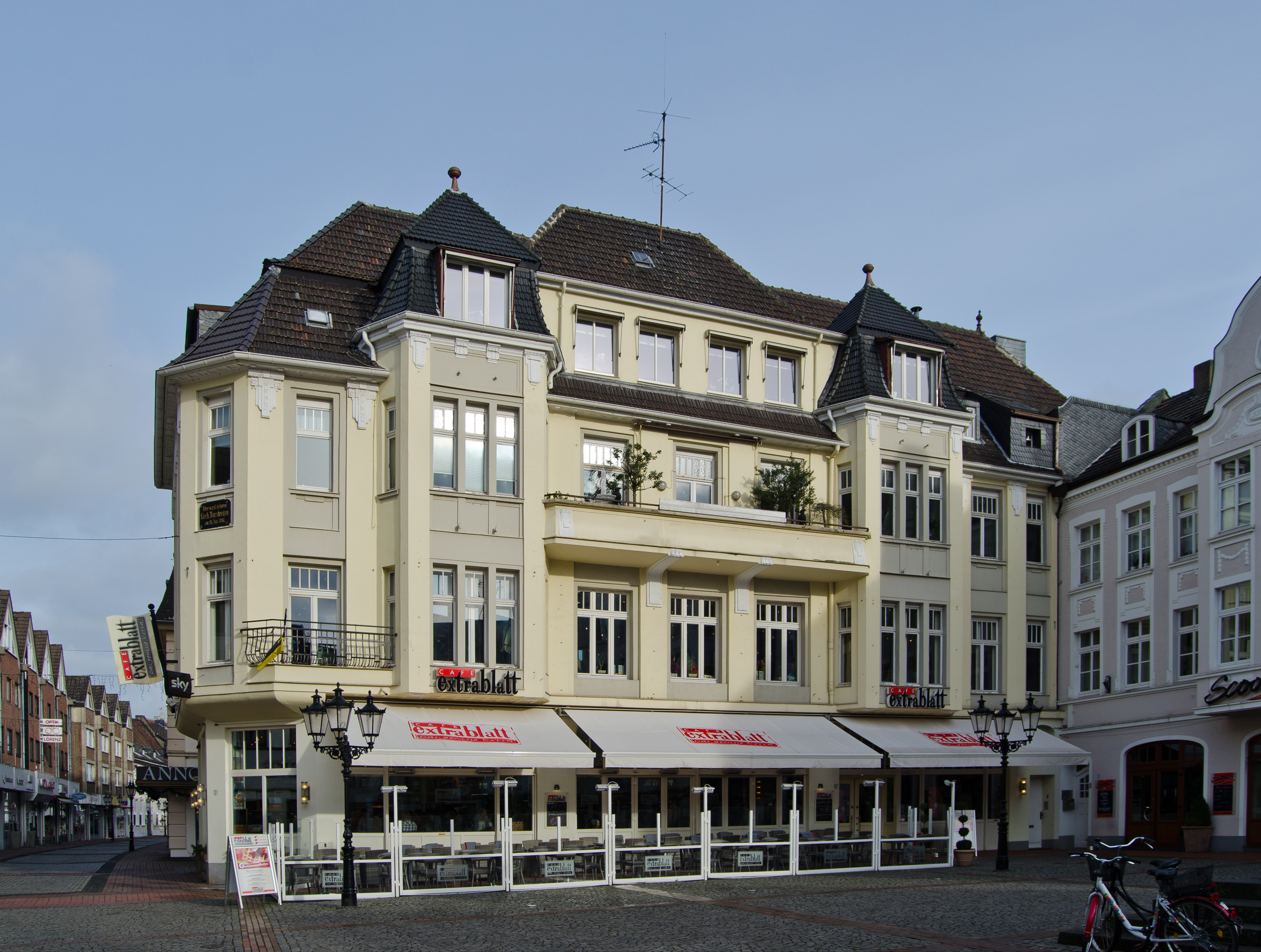
Birthplace of Gerhard Tersteegen

- Gerhard Tersteegen (1697–1769), lay preacher, mystic and poet.
- Georg Perthes (1869–1927), surgeon and radiologist (Perthes disease)
- Anna Erler-Schnaudt (1878–1963), contralto
- Hans Dammers (1913–1944), Luftwaffe ace
- Walter Niephaus (1923–1992), chess master
- Hanns Dieter Hüsch (1925–2005), comedian, writer
- Hubert Hahne (1935–2019), racing driver
- Helmut Kelleners (born 1939), racing driver
- Herman Weigel (born 1950), film producer and screenwriter
- Armin Hahne (born 1955), racing driver
- Jürgen Renn (born 1956), physicist and historian of science
- Helga Trüpel (born 1958), politician (Alliance 90/The Greens)
- Jörg van Ommen (born 1962), racing driver
- Katja Nass (born 1968), fencer
- Stephan Paßlack (born 1970), footballer
- Christian Ehrhoff (born 1982), ice hockey player
- Timo Weß (born 1982), field hockey player
- Benjamin Weß (born 1985), field hockey player
- Regina Abelt (born 1954), first First Lady of Ethiopia (1995–2001)

== Politics ==
=== List of mayors ===
- 1815–1820: Wilhelm Urbach
- 1822–1830: von Nievenheim
- 1830–1850: Friedrich Adolf Vinmann
- 1850–1859: Karl von Strampff
- 1860–1864: Gottlieb Meumann
- 1864–1897: Gustav Kautz
- 1898–1910: August Craemer
- 1910–1915: Richard Glum
- 1917–1937: Fritz Eckert
- 1937–1941: Fritz Grüttgen
- 1943–1945: Peter Linden
- 1945–1946: Otto Maiweg
- 1946: Karl Peschken
- 1946–1952: Wilhelm Müller
- 1952–1977: Albin Neuse (SPD)
- 1977–1999: Wilhelm Brunswick (SPD)
- 1999–2004: Rafael Hofmann (CDU)
- 2004–2014: Norbert Ballhaus (SPD)
- 2014-2025: Christoph Fleischhauer(CDU)
- 2025–: Julia Zupancic (CDU)

=== City council ===
Results of the 2020 city council election.

The Moers city council governs the city alongside the Mayor. The most recent city council election was held on 13 September 2020, and the results were as follows:

Party	Votes	%	±	Seats	±
Christian Democratic Union (CDU)	12,431	31.3	▼3.2	17	▼2
Social Democratic Party (SPD)	11,593	29.2	▼8.5	16	▼4
Alliance 90/The Greens (Grüne)	6,563	16.5	▲7.5	9	▲4
Alternative for Germany (AfD)	2,548	6.4	New	3	New
Free Democratic Party (FDP)	1,860	4.7	▼0.3	2	▼1
Die Grafschafter (Graf)	1,544	3.9	▼2.9	2	▼2
Die PARTEI	1,302	3.3	New	2	New
The Left (Die Linke)	1,125	2.8	▼3.5	2	▼1
Free Citizens' List Moers (FBM)	733	1.9	New	1	New
Valid votes	39,699	98.2			
Invalid votes	710	1.8			
Total	40,409	100.0		54	±0
Electorate/voter turnout	80,950	49.9			
Source: City of Moers

== Twin towns – sister cities ==
Moers is twinned with:

- Maisons-Alfort, France (1966)
- Bapaume, France (1974)
- Knowsley, England, United Kingdom (1980)
- Ramla, Israel (1987)
- La Trinidad, Nicaragua (1989)
- Seelow, Germany (1990)
- Stazzema, Italy (2019)

== See also ==
- Moers Festival
- Burma-Shave, which awarded a trip to Moers in a 1955 promotion
