= Bale Hawassa =

City in Wolaita, Ethiopia

Bale Hawassa: Bale Hawaasa (Wolaytta); በሌ ሀዋሳ (Amharic)
- City
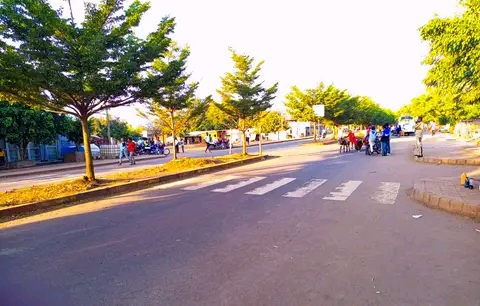

- Location within Wolayita Zone Location within Ethiopia
- Coordinates: 6°55′05″N 37°31′55″E
- Country: Ethiopia
- Region: South Ethiopia Regional State
- Zone: Wolaita
- District: Kindo Koysha
- Elevation: 1,500 m (4,900 ft)

Population (2023)
  - Total: 18,532
  - Males: 8,995
  - Females: 9,537

Bale Hawassa (Wolayttattuwa: Bale Hawaasa) or in short Bale is a city in Wolayita Zone of South Ethiopia Regional State, Ethiopia. The city is one of eleven city administrations in Wolaita Zone. It is administrative capital of Kindo Koysha district of Wolayita Zone, Ethiopia. Bale is located about 400 km away from Addis Ababa to the south on the path Addis-Butajira-Sodo and 38 km westward from Sodo, the capital of Wolaita Zone. The city has an average elevation 1500 meter above sea level. Bale Hawassa lies between 6°55'05" North, and 37°31'55" East.

== Demographics ==
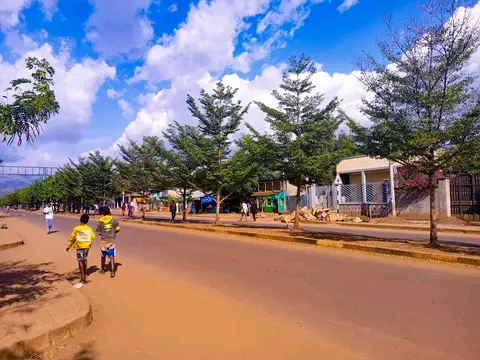
Bale Hawassa City Road

Bale Hawassa is one of populated places in the South Ethiopia Regional State. Based on 2023 population projection conducted by central statistical service of Ethiopia, the city has total population comprises 18,532. And Males count 8,995 and Females count 9,537.

== Tourism ==
Tourism in Bale Hawassa includes the Omo artificial lake, formed by the Gibe III Dam reservoir. It offers opportunities for recreational boating, fishing and water transportation. The city also has potential for cultural and nature-based tourism. Tourism development in Bale Hawassa has also received attention through the national tourism development initiative, with the Hailemariam and Roman Foundation involved in ecotourism promotion.
