= Chris Houlding =

Chris Houlding was appointed Principal Trombone of the Orchestra of Opera North, England, when he was 21 and has played as Guest Principal with the best of UK ensembles and recently represented the UK in the World Orchestra of Peace in Russia. He is also known as an influential teacher and held the position of Senior Tutor at the Royal Northern College of Music in Manchester for many years.

== Education ==
A graduate of London's Guildhall School of Music, Chris studied with Denis Wick, Eric Crees and Peter Gane, and was awarded the Principal's Prize. Prior to this he was a member of the National Youth Brass Band, National Youth Jazz Orchestra and European Union Youth Orchestra, gaining the LRAM Diploma under John Iveson.

== Career ==
He gives recitals and masterclasses throughout the UK, including at Roger Argente's "Bone Lab" at the Dartington Festival. He has also appeared as a tutor on Joseph Alessi’s Summer Seminar together with appearances at Juilliard, Eastman School of Music and Boston University in the USA.

As conductor, he is Music Director of the Slaithwaite Philharmonic Orchestra and regularly conducts ensembles including the Northern Junior Philharmonic, Lancashire Youth Symphony, Derbyshire County Wind Orchestra and Grimethorpe Colliery Band. During 2004-5 he completed a course in conducting at the RNCM to gain further experience under the watchful eye of Mark Elder CBE.

President of the British Trombone Society 2001-2005, Chris has given his time to promote the trombone through a range of events throughout the UK, including an education partnership with jazz trombonist Dennis Rollins.

Chris has had pieces written for him including Simon Wills' "Lucifer" and "Bujole" and Eric Crees' "Flourish".

Since 2007 he has held the position of professor of chamber music and trombone at the Folkwang Hochschule in Germany.

In 2008, Chris released his first solo CD. Called Houlding His Own, it features standard trombone repertoire such as the sonatas by Hindemith and Sulek along with other, less familiar, repertoire for trombone alone and with piano.
