= Wrage =

Wrage is a surname. Notable people with the surname include:

- Glenn Wrage (born 1959), American actor and model, performing in television, film, and video games
- Greta Wrage von Pustau (1902–1989), Chinese-born German dancer and teacher
