= German Brass =

German Brass is a professional brass ensemble, founded in 1974 as a brass quintet. Until 1983 the ensemble performed under the names Deutsches Blechbläserquintett, German Brass Quintett and Quintette à Cuivres Allemand.

In 1985, to record the CD "Bach 300" commemorating 300 years since the birth of Johann Sebastian Bach, the group was extended by Enrique Crespo to ten performers. At that time the ensemble was renamed German Brass. In 2011, differences arose over the trademark rights for German Brass between Crespo and the other members of the ensemble. Since then, they have performed without trombonist Crespo.

More than twenty CDs and two DVDs have been recorded to date. German Brass musicians are members of major German symphony orchestras and/or are professors at university schools of music.

The current members are:

Trumpets:

- Matthias Höfs
- Uwe Köller
- Werner Heckmann
- Christoph Baerwind

Trombones:

- Alexander Erbrich-Crawford
- Uwe Füssel
- Fritz Winter

French horns

- Wolfgang Gaag
- Klaus Wallendorf

Tuba:

- Stefan Ambrosius

Percussion

- Herbert Wachter
