= Folkwang University of the Arts =

Arts school based in Essen, Germany

Coordinates: 51°23′15″N 7°00′16″E

- Folkwang Universität der Künste
- Former names: Folkwangschule für Musik, Tanz und Sprechen (1927–63); Folkwang-Hochschule (1963–2010)
- Type: Public
- Established: 1927
- Founders: Hein Heckroth; Kurt Jooss; Rudolf Schulz-Dornburg
- Rector: Holger Zebu Kluth
- Students: 1627 (SoSe 2022)
- Location: Essen, North Rhine-Westphalia, Germany
- Campus: Multi-site
- Website: folkwang-uni.de

The Folkwang University of the Arts is a university for music, theater, dance, design, and academic studies, located in four German cities of North Rhine-Westphalia. Since 1927, its traditional main location has been in the former Werden Abbey in Essen in the Ruhr area, with additional facilities in Duisburg, Bochum, and Dortmund, and, since 2010, at the Zeche Zollverein, a World Heritage Site also in Essen. The Folkwang University is home to the international dance company Folkwang Tanz Studio (FTS). Founded as Folkwangschule, its name was Folkwang Hochschule (Folkwang Academy) from 1963 until 2009.

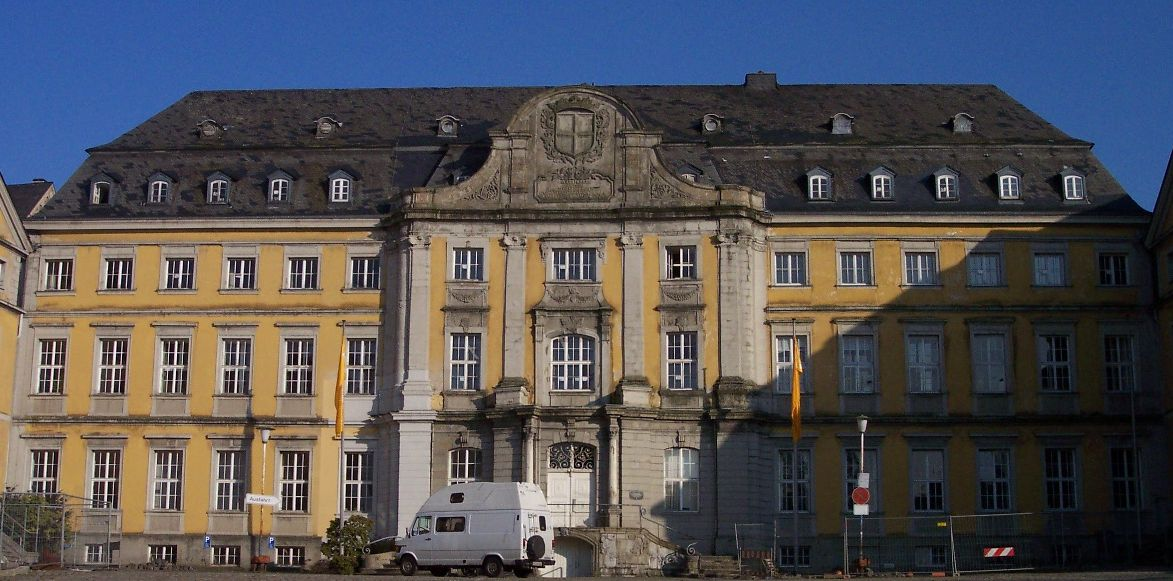
Main building of the Folkwang University in Essen-Werden

== History ==
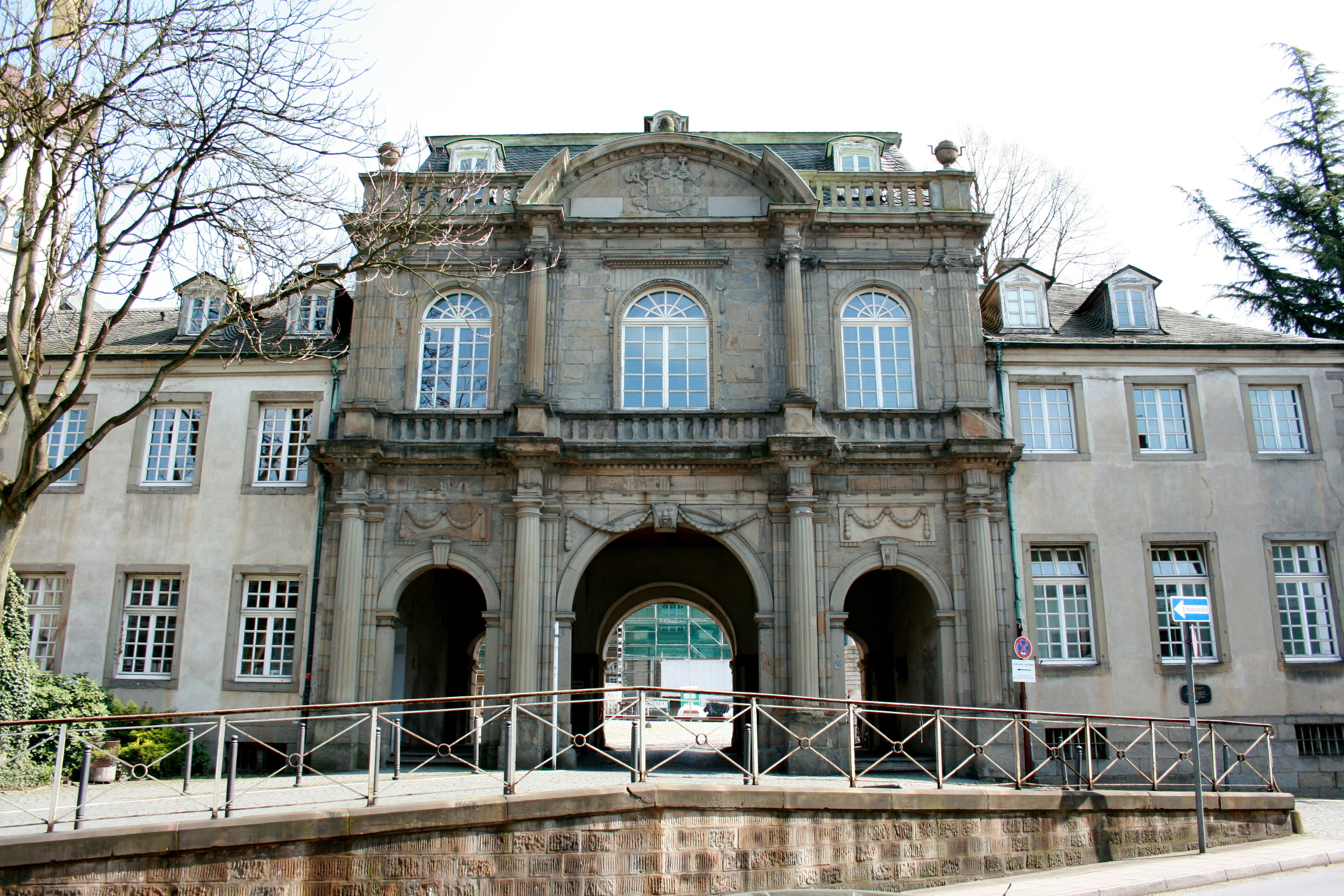
Folkwang-Hochschule

The university shares its unusual name with the Museum Folkwang founded in 1902 by arts patron Karl Ernst Osthaus. The term Folkwang derives from Fólkvangr, the Old Norse name of a mythical meadow where the dead gather who are chosen by Freyja, the Norse goddess of love and beauty, to spend the afterlife with her. The school's founders, opera director Rudolf Schulz-Dornburg, stage designer Hein Heckroth and choreographer Kurt Jooss, regarded this Folkwang as a symbol for the arts as a unified whole, rather than divided into separate classes. The Folkwangschule für Musik, Tanz und Sprechen (Folkwang School for Music, Dance, and Speech) opened in 1927 in Essen, and in 1928 a previously established school of design merged with the institution.

In 1963 the Folkwang school was renamed Folkwang-Hochschule (Folkwang Academy). In 2010 the institution began offering graduate studies and was renamed Folkwang University of the Arts. This coincided with Ruhr.2010, the festival in which the Ruhr district was designated the European Capital of Culture for the year 2010.

== Activities ==
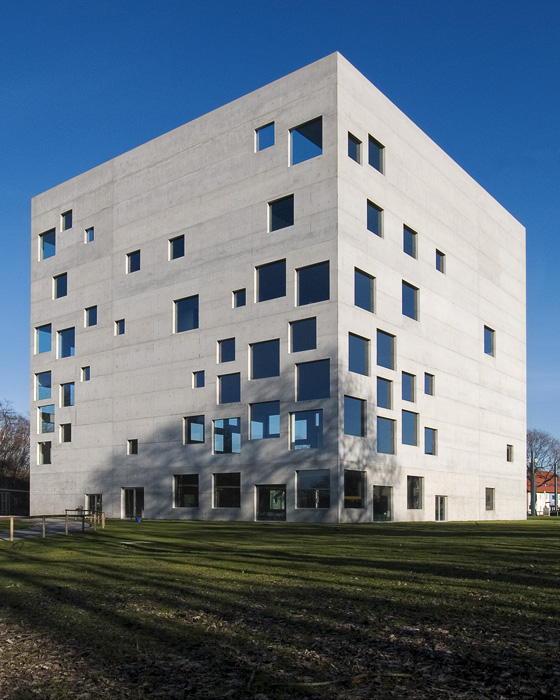
SANAA building at Zeche Zollverein; since 2010, location of the design faculty

The Folkwang University unites training in music, theatre, dance, design, and scholarship, in order to encourage collaboration among the arts. Public events take place at the Folkwang University on its six in-house stages and in collaboration with cultural institutions of the region, such as the Philharmonie Essen, the Schauspiel Bochum, Musiktheater im Revier, the Duisburg Philharmonic, the Wuppertaler Bühnen and the Ruhrfestspiele.

Folkwang University of the Arts is structured into four distinct faculties, each specializing in various artistic and academic disciplines:

- Faculty 1: Focuses on practical artistic and musical courses, including instrumental training, jazz, composition, professional performance, orchestral playing, and popular music.
- Faculty 2: Offers artistic, artistic-academic, artistic-pedagogical, and academic courses such as music teaching, music pedagogy, musicology, integrative music theory, vocal ensemble direction, and music of the Middle Ages.
- Faculty 3: Dedicated to performing arts, this faculty encompasses programs in voice and music theatre, musical, physical theatre, acting, directing, dance, dance composition, and dance pedagogy.
- Faculty 4: Centres on design disciplines, providing courses in photography, industrial design, communication design, and art and design science.

Undergraduate courses:

- Instrumental training for different musical instruments (accordion, bassoon, cello, clarinet, double bass, flute, guitar, harp, harpsichord, horn, oboe, organ, percussion, piano, recorder, saxophone, trombone, trumpet, tuba, viola, violin)
- Jazz / Performing Artist
- Integrative composition (instrumental composition, electronic composition, jazz composition, pop composition, composition and visualisation)
- Church music
- Voice (concert performance, Lieder, oratorio and music theatre)
- School Music
- Music pedagogy
- Musicology in combination with an artistic subject
- Musicals
- Acting
- Physical Theatre
- Directing
- Dance
- Industrial Design
- Communication Design
- Photography

Advanced programs:

- Orchestral playing
- Conducting (orchestral/choir)
- Vocal Ensemble Direction
- Musicology in combination with an artistic discipline
- Chamber music
- Composition (electronic composition, instrumental composition, instrumental/electronic composition)
- Concert Performance
- Solo Dance
- Choreography
- Labanotation
- Dance Pedagogy

== Faculty ==
Faculty have included:

- Hermann Baumann, hornist
- Young-Chang Cho, cellist
- Anna Erler-Schnaudt, contralto
- Catherine Gayer, coloratura soprano
- Wilfried Gruhn (music pedagogy)
- Hansgünther Heyme, theatre director
- Chris Houlding
- Nicolaus A. Huber
- Ifor James
- Peter Janssens
- Nana Jashvili, violinist
- Maria Jonas, mezzo-soprano
- Kurt Jooss
- Nicola Jürgensen (born 1975), clarinet
- Suyeon Kang, violinist (chamber music)
- Uwe Köller
- Scott Lawton, conductor
- Fritz Lehmann, conductor
- Frank Lloyd, hornist
- Lore Lorentz
- Lauren Newton
- Walter Nicks
- Ralf Otto (born 1956), choral conducting
- Krzysztof Penderecki (1966 to 1968), composer
- Reinhard Peters (1926–2008), conductor
- Gudrun Schröfel choral conducting
- Gerhard Stäbler
- Rita Streich, operatic soprano
- Paul Tortelier
- Adolf Wamper (1901–1977), sculptor

== Alumni ==
Alumni include:

- Pina Bausch (1940–2009), choreographer
- Anne Bierwirth, contralto
- Max Burchartz
- Andreas Deja
- Vladimir Djambazov (born 1954), composer, French horn, sound designer
- Stefan Dohr (born 1965), principal horn player of the Berlin Philharmonic
- Tommy Finke
- Thomas Gabriel (composer) (born 1957)
- Agnes Giebel (born 1920), soprano
- Ulrike Grossarth (born 1952), dancer and visual artist
- Anna Handler (born 1996), pianist and conductor
- Klara Höfels (1949–2022), actress and producer
- Hilmar Hoffmann (1925–2018), founder of Oberhausen film festival, cultural politician in Frankfurt, director of Goethe-Institut
- Reinhild Hoffmann (born 1943), choreographer
- Siegfried Jerusalem (born 1940), tenor
- Salome Kammer (born 1959), cellist, vocalist
- David Kamp
- Heinz Kiwitz
- Helmut Koch (conductor) (1908–1975), conductor, choir leader, broadcasting manager, composer
- Susanne Linke
- Christof Loy (born 1962), opera director
- Gerd Ludwig
- Ann Mandrella
- John McGuire (composer)
- Adéọlá Ọlágúnjú
- Carlos Orta
- Jürgen Prochnow (born 1941), actor
- Andreas Pruys, bass
- Karl Ridderbusch (1932–1997), bass
- Armin Rohde (born 1955), actor
- Thomas Ruff
- Magdalene Schauss-Flake (1921–2008), composer and organist
- Stefanie Schneider
- Peter Schwickerath (born 1942), sculptor
- Harald Siepermann, animator and character designer
- Ruth Siewert (1915–2002), contralto
- Anton Stankowski
- Günther Strupp
- Raphael Thoene
- Graham Waterhouse (born 1962), composer and cellist
- Dirk Weiler
- Greta Wrage von Pustau, dancer and dance teacher

== See also ==
- Folkwang Kammerorchester Essen
