= Hans Chemin-Petit =

German composer and conductor

Hans Helmuth Chemin-Petit (24 July 1902 – 12 April 1981) was a German composer, conductor and music educator.

== Life ==
Born in Potsdam, the son of Hans Chemin-Petit the Elder and a concert singer studied from 1920 to 1926 violoncello with Hugo Becker and composition with Paul Juon at the Musikhochschule Berlin. He began his musical career as a cellist. In 1929 he celebrated his first national compositional successes with the chamber opera Der gefangene Vogel at the Duisburg opera festival and in 1933 with the premiere of his 1st Symphony in Dresden under Fritz Busch. In addition to Busch, Wilhelm Furtwängler, Siegmund von Hausegger and Hans Joachim Moser were also among his patrons. From 1929, he taught at the Academy for Church and School Music in Berlin.

After the Machtergreifung by the Nazis, Chemin-Petit was in the Nazi Nationalsozialistischer Altherrenbund, which from 1938 called itself the National Socialist Altherrenbund of German Students. He also became a member of the National Socialist People's Welfare and of the National Socialist Factory Cell Organization (NSBO), of which he was no longer a member in 1938. He was appointed a member of the Werkprüfungsausschuss der Deutschen Komponisten. As late as 7 October 1934, he was able to perform in a concert of the Berlin Philharmonic. On 7 October 1934, he was still able to perform excerpts from the incidental music to Shakespeare's A Midsummer Night's Dream by Felix Mendelssohn Bartholdy in a concert of the Berlin Philharmonic Orchestra. In 1936, he was appointed professor at the Berlin University of the Arts. On 24 May 1938, Chemin-Petit's cantata An die Liebe was performed as part of the Reichsmusiktage. In 1939, he took over the direction of the Reblingsche Gesangsverein and the cathedral choir in Magdeburg, and in 1943 of the Philharmonischer Chor Berlin. In the final phase of the Second World War, he was briefly a member of the Volkssturm from 6 December 1944.

In 1945, he was re-employed at the Berlin Musikhochschule and additionally became director of the Potsdam Municipal Choir. He gave lessons in music theory, composition and choral conducting. In Potsdam, he founded the "Collegium musicum" in 1945. In 1965, he was appointed deputy director of the Hochschule für Musik, a post he held until his retirement in 1969. In 1963, he was appointed a member of the Academy of Arts, Berlin, where he became director of the music department in 1968. His students included Magdalene Schauss-Flake.

Chemin-Petit was considered one of the most important choral conductors of his time and made a special contribution to the Berlin Philharmonic Choir, which he conducted from 1943 to 1981. Besides standard works from Baroque, classic and Romantic music, the then contemporary music formed an important cornerstone of his repertoire. Thus, he conducted numerous premieres and first performances of the works of composers such as Paul Hindemith, Johann Nepomuk David, Boris Blacher, Rudolf Wagner-Régeny, Günter Bialas and Harald Genzmer, as well as his own compositions.

Chemin-Petit died in Berlin at the age of 78 and was buried at the Luisenstädtischer Friedhof.

== Honours ==
- Berliner Kunstpreis (1964)
- Bundesverdienstkreuz am Bande (25 March 1968)
- Goldene Nadel der Dramatiker-Union (1977)
- Ernst-Reuter-Plakette of the city of Berlin (1977)
- Goldene Ehrennadel des Volksbund Deutsche Kriegsgräberfürsorge (1978).

== Tonal language ==
Chemin-Petit's main works are in the field of choral-symphonic vocal music. His cantatas and psalms settings are particularly noteworthy. He also wrote orchestral works, operas, chamber music and numerous smaller pieces for choir a cappella. He was a conservative composer whose works are consistently tonal. What is striking about many of his compositions is a great preference for contrapuntal forms of composition, such as canon, fugue and passacaglia, which he was able to shape with sovereign mastery, even in their most complicated forms. Chemin-Petit's style unites various influences from Heinrich Schütz and Johann Sebastian Bach to Anton Bruckner, Max Reger and Paul Hindemith and can be characterised overall as Neoclassicism rooted in the tradition of German late Romanticism, in which archaising and modern elements come together.

== Work ==
=== Operas ===
- Der Gefangene Vogel, Lyrical play for people or puppets (libretto: Karla Höcker; 1927, premiere Berlin 1927).
- King Nicolo, opera in 7 scenes (libretto: Hans Chemin-Petit after Frank Wedekind; 1959, premiere Aachen 1962)
- Die Komödiantin, light-hearted opera in 3 scenes (libretto: Hans Chemin-Petit after Heinz Coubier; 1965, premiere Coburg 1970)
- The Rivals, light-hearted chamber opera (libretto: Hans Chemin-Petit and Wolfgang Poch after Gian Francesco Loredano; 1969, première Berlin 1984)
- Kassandra, drama in 2 scenes with preface and epilogue (libretto: Hans Chemin-Petit after Aeschylus; 1980, première Berlin 1982)

=== Vocal music ===
- Von der Eitelkeit der Welt, cantata after Andreas Gryphius for baritone and chamber orchestra (1935)
- Werkleute sind wir, cantata after Rainer Maria Rilke for soprano, baritone, mixed choir and orchestra (1944)
- Psalm Triptych, 1962 subsequently combined from:
  - The 90th Psalm for baritone, mixed choir and orchestra (1953).
  - The 150th Psalm for mixed choir and orchestra (1954)
  - The 98th Psalm for mixed choir and orchestra (1962)
- Prooemion after Johann Wolfgang von Goethe for mixed choir and organ (1960) or winds and percussion (1961)
- Summa vitae, cantata after Kurt Ihlenfeld and Psalm 130, 1 for mixed choir and chamber orchestra (1964)
- Symphonic Cantata after words of Predictor Solomon for alto, mixed choir and orchestra (1966)
- Introit and Hymn after Psalm 148 for mixed choir, organ, winds, harp and percussion (1969)
- numerous motets, hymns, songs and madrigals for choir a cappella

=== Orchestral music ===
- Concerto for Violoncello and Orchestra (1931)
- Symphony No. 1 in A minor (1932)
- Orchestral Prologue (1939)
- Orchestral Concerto in D major (1944)
- Symphony No. 2 in C major (1949)
- Intrada e Passacaglia (1963)
- Concerto for Organ, String Orchestra and Timpani (1963)
- Music for Orchestra 1968 (1968)
- Concerto for Violin and Orchestra (1971)
- Concerto for recorder (f') and harpsichord with string orchestra and percussion (1973)
- Concerto symphonico for orchestra (1976)
- Serene Suite for Orchestra (1980)

=== Chamber music ===
- 2 string quartets, in E minor (1925) and G minor (1926).
- Little Suite for 9 solo instruments based on the music for the puppet show Dr. Johannes Faust (1938)
- Trio in the old style for oboe, clarinet and bassoon (1943)
- 2 solo sonatas for recorder (f'), in F (1956) and in d (1960)
- Quintet for flute, oboe, clarinet, horn and bassoon (1948)
- Sonata in d for recorder (f') and organ in D minor (1964)
