= Anna Erler-Schnaudt =

German contralto and singing teacher

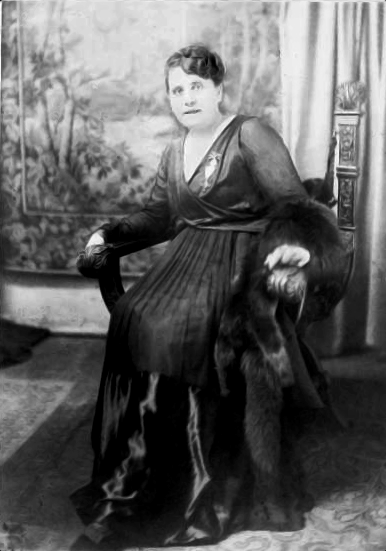
- The singer, who signed the photograph in 1920
- Born: Anna Schnaudt; 11 March 1878; Moers, German Empire
- Died: 30 April 1963 (aged 85); Viersen, West Germany
- Occupations: Classical contralto; Voice teacher
- Organizations: Folkwangschule
- Spouse: Karl Erler

Anna Erler-Schnaudt (11 March 1878 – 30 April 1963) was a German contralto and voice teacher. She performed in the premiere of Mahler's Eighth Symphony and taught at the Folkwangschule.

== Career ==
Anna Schnaudt was born in Moers. She studied voice in Munich with Karl Erler, whom she later married, from 1903 to 1906. She made her concert debut in Munich in 1906. She was a soloist in the premiere of Mahler's Eighth Symphony on 12 September 1910, performing the parts Alto II and Maria Aegyptiaca. She sang concerts also in Berlin, Cologne, Leipzig, in France, the Netherlands, Poland and Czechoslovakia.

The composer Max Reger, who probably met her in 1906, dedicated his only orchestral song "An die Hoffnung", Op. 124, to her and conducted the Meininger Hofkapelle in the first performance in Eisenach on 12 October 1912. Reger requested the singer to perform in his memorial service in case of his death. She remained dedicated to him after his death, giving the autograph of the piano version of "An die Hoffnung" and several other memorabilia to the Max-Reger-Institute.

She performed in a symphony concert in Bonn in 1914, with Paul Sauer conducting the Städtisches Orchester playing works by Richard Strauss and Reger, including songs and Reger's Piano Concerto. The reviewer of the magazine Musik wrote: "... in den Liedern der beiden Meister zeigte sich Anna Erler-Schnaudt als glänzende Interpretin" (... in song by both masters, she appeared as a brilliant interpreter). She was the alto soloist in a performance of Bruckner's Mass in F minor and Psalm 150 at the Tonhalle Munich on 21 February 1924, performed by the Konzertvereins-Orchester und die Konzertgesellschaft für Chorgesang, conducted by Hanns Rohr, alongside Nelly Merz, Emil Graf, Julius Gieß and with the organist Hermann Sagerer.

Erler-Schnaudt worked as a voice teacher first in Munich, then from 1928 at the Folkwangschule in Essen. Among her students are Marga Höffgen and her niece Ruth Siewert. Erler-Schnaudt died in Viersen.
