= Gacheno =

Town in Wolaita Zone, Southern Nations, Nationalities, and People's Region, Ethiopia

Gacheno: Gacheno Ambaa (Wolaytta); ጋቼኖ (Amharic)
- Town
- Location within Ethiopia
- Coordinates: 7°03′22″N 37°55′14″E
- Country: Ethiopia
- Region: South Ethiopia Regional State
- Zone: Wolaita
- Woreda: Damot Gale
- Elevation: 1,882 m (6,175 ft)
- Time zone: UTC+3 (EAT)

Gacheno (Geʽez: ጋቼኖ) is a town in Wolayita Zone, South Ethiopia Regional State, Ethiopia. Gacheno is located about 287 km via B51 away from Addis Ababa to the south and also 31 km away from Sodo to the North, the capital of Wolaita Zone within Damot Gale woreda. The town is located at an elevation of 1,882 meters above sea level. Gacheno lies between 7°03'22" N and 37°55'14"E. The Ethiopian 3rd lady Roman Tesfaye was born and completed her primary school in this town.

== Infrastructures ==
There is a public library under construction with one classroom in Gacheno. The Hailemariam and Roman Foundation requested Japan's assistance to construct this public library with a vocational training classroom for the community. The town has also amenities, which includes, 24 hours electricity, pure public water, banks, schools, postal service, telecommunications services and others.
