= Hailemariam and Roman Foundation =

Non-profit foundation in Addis Ababa, Ethiopia

- Formation: April 2018; 8 years ago
- Founders: Hailemariam Dessalegn; Roman Tesfaye
- Type: Non-profit international NGO
- Headquarters: Addis Ababa, Ethiopia
- Region served: Ethiopia
- Method: Donations, grants
- Key people: Hailemariam Dessalegn (co-founder); Roman Tesfaye (co-founder)
- Website: Official website

The Hailemariam and Roman Foundation (Ge'ez: ኃይለማርያም እና ሮማን ፋውንዴሽን) is a non-profit organization based in Addis Ababa, Ethiopia. The foundation was established in April 2018 by former Ethiopian Prime Minister Hailemariam Desalegn and former First Lady Roman Tesfaye. The foundation's programs are focused on improving the health and nutrition of young children and mothers, as well as transforming the tourism and conservation of selected national parks in the most remote areas of Ethiopia.

Co-founder, Hailemariam Desalegn, said the foundation would give priority to Afar, Southern Nations, Nationalities, and Peoples' Region, Benishangul-Gumuz and Gambella states.

== History ==
In April 2018, the foundation was launched as an international NGO in an agreement reached with the Government of the Federal Democratic Republic of Ethiopia. On 16 October 2020, the foundation received accreditation from the Ethiopian Civil Society Organizations Agency.

== Financial support ==
On 6 October 2020, the foundation received 3.2 million birr of funding from the federal government of Japan for the construction of a public library in Gacheno, within the Wolayita Zone.
