= Helga Trüpel =

German politician (born 1958)

Helga Trüpel MEP
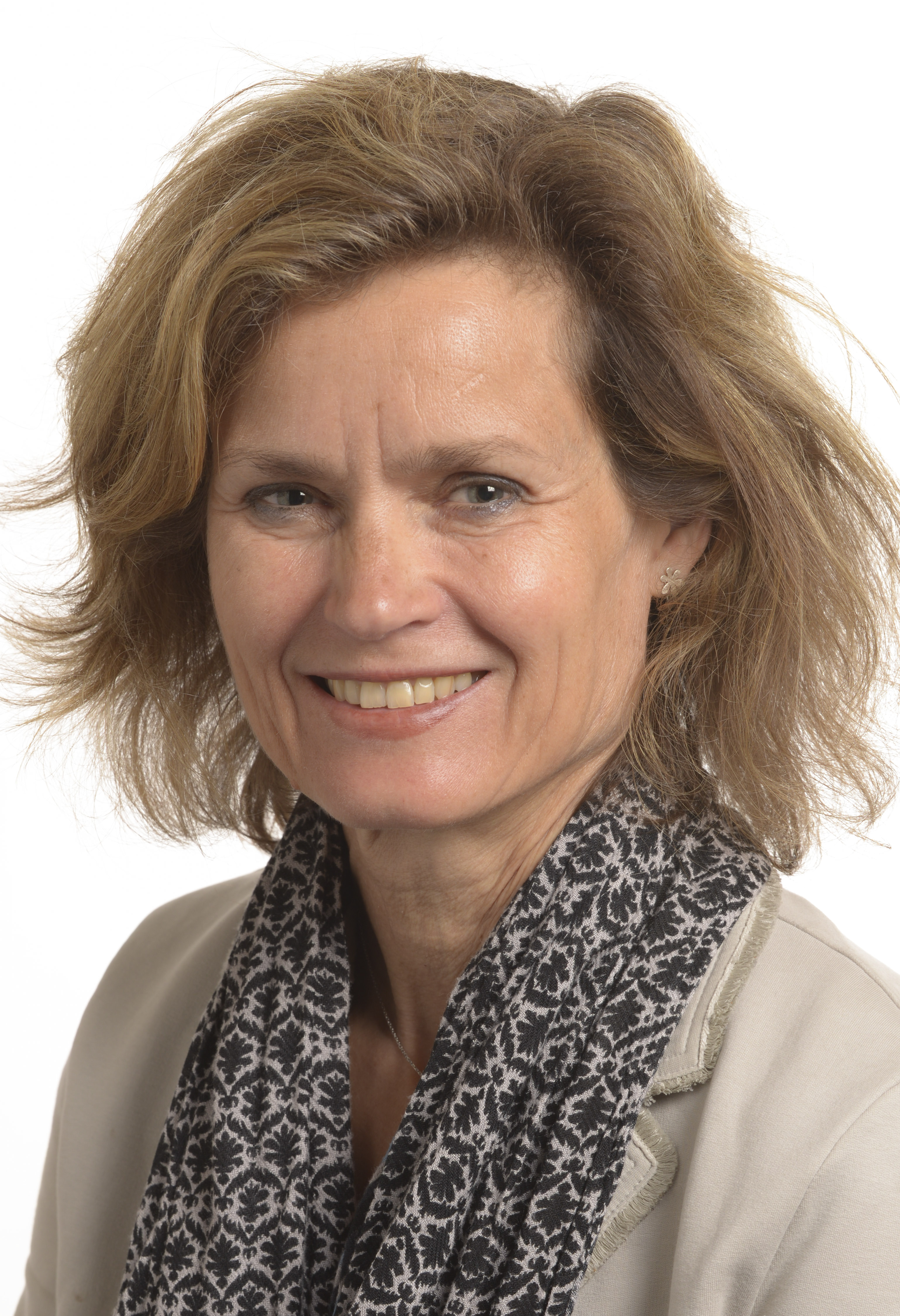

Member of the European Parliament
- In office 1 July 2004 – 1 July 2019
- Constituency: Germany

Personal details
- Born: 21 July 1958 (age 68) Moers, North Rhine-Westphalia, West Germany
- Party: German: Alliance '90/The Greens; EU: The Greens–European Free Alliance
- Education: University of Bremen
- Website: www.helgatrupel.de

Helga Trüpel (born 21 July 1958) is a German politician who served as Member of the European Parliament (MEP) from 2004 until 2019. She is a member of the Alliance '90/The Greens, part of the European Green Party.

== Educational background ==
Helga Trüpel studied German, Religious Studies, and Psychology at the University of Bremen. In 1988 she completed her PhD in German Literature.

== Political career ==
In 1980 Trüpel joined the political party The Greens, today called Alliance '90/The Greens.

=== Bremen ===
From 1987 to 1991 she was an elected member of the State Parliament of Bremen.

From 1991 to 1995 she served as Bremen's State Minister for Culture and the Integration of Immigrants under the coalition government of Klaus Wedemeier. She also headed the Department of Environmental Protection and Urban Development for a brief period beginning in February 1995.

From 1996 to 2004 she once again served as a member of the State Parliament of Bremen. She additionally served as the body's Vice President in the last two years of her term.

=== Europe ===
In 2004, 2009 and 2014 Trüpel was elected Member of the European Parliament (MEP) at the federal conferences of Alliance '90/The Greens. During her tenure as a MEP she held a variety of positions.

From 2004 to 2014 she served as deputy spokesperson of the German delegation of Greens. During this period she also served as her parliamentary group's spokesperson for budgetary affairs.

From 2004 to 2019 she was deputy chair of the Committee on Culture and Education.

From 2014 to 2019 she was a deputy member of the Committee on Budgets.

In addition to her committee assignments, Trüpel was also member of the European Parliament's Delegation for Relations with the People's Republic of China and a deputy member of the Delegation for Relations with the United States of America.

While criticizing the Jamaica Coalition in November 2017, Trüpel referred to Christian Democratic Union politician Jens Spahn as "right-wing, gay Spahn." This was met with nationwide criticism, leading to Trüpel temporarily suspending her party membership.

In September 2017, Trüpel announced that she would not stand in the 2019 European elections but instead resign from active politics by the end of the parliamentary term. In her statement, Trüpel said she could not agree with the direction of the Green Party in the EU Parliament, particularly its support of open borders and increasing numbers of refugees.

Trüpel was also a vocal supporter of a highly controversial reform to the European Union's copyright law concerning digital content. She published a manifesto in support of the reform. Her claims were met with pushback from IT and legal experts, many of whom accused her of being misinformed.

== Later career ==
Trüpel was nominated by her party as delegate to the Federal Convention for the purpose of electing the President of Germany in 2022.
