= Roman Tesfaye =

3rd First Lady of Ethiopia

Roman Tesfaye ሮማን ተስፋዬ
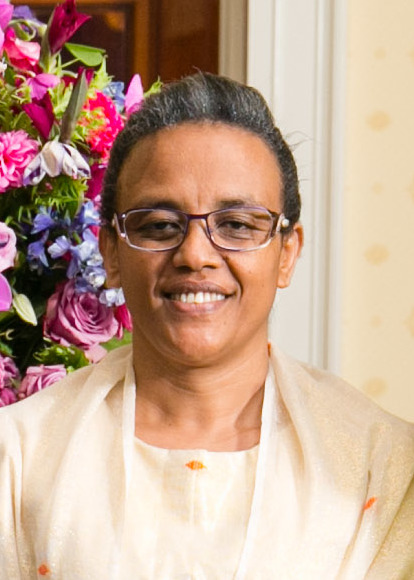
- Roman in 2014

3rd First Lady of Ethiopia
- In office 20 August 2012 – 2 April 2018
- President: Girma Wolde-Giorgis; Mulatu Teshome
- Prime Minister: Hailemariam Desalegn
- Preceded by: Azeb Mesfin
- Succeeded by: Zinash Tayachew

Chairperson of Stop Cervical, Breast and Prostate Cancer in Africa
- In office 25 July 2016 – 25 July 2017
- Preceded by: Margaret Kenyatta

Personal details
- Born: 16 April 1968 (age 58) Gatcheno, Wolaita, Ethiopian Empire
- Party: Southern Ethiopian People's Democratic Movement
- Other political affiliations: Ethiopian People's Revolutionary Democratic Front
- Spouse: Hailemariam Dessalegn
- Children: 3
- Education: Addis Ababa University; Arba Minch University

Roman Tesfaye Abneh (Amharic: ሮማን ተስፋዬ አብነህ; Wolaytta: Aabinee Tasfaayee Ooromaano; born 16 April 1968) is an Ethiopian politician and activist who was the third First Lady of the Federal Democratic Republic of Ethiopia from September 2012 to February 2018. She is married to Prime Minister Hailemariam Desalegn. She holds two master's degrees in economics and leadership. Prior to her position as First Lady, she served in Arba Minch University in South Ethiopia Regional State, as a lecturer of Economics, economic advisor to South Region's administration, Federal level as the Federal Ministry of Women Affairs, South Ethiopia as the administrator of Regional Bureau of Finance and Economic Development, Regional Secretariat for the National Poverty Reduction Strategy Paper Preparation, and the Bureau of Plan and Economic Development.

She has also previously held high level roles within the Ministry of Women's Affairs, the Ethiopian Human Rights Commission, and for two terms she has served as an active member of South Ethiopia Regional State Parliament. She focused her attention on building economic opportunities for Ethiopian women, addressing nutrition and education for youth, and promoting the global health initiative, Pink Ribbon Red Ribbon that combats cervical and breast cancer, the leading causes of cancer deaths among women in sub‐Saharan Africa.

First Lady Roman is an advocate of women's economic empowerment towards positive social transformation. Since establishing the office of the First Lady; which is the first in the country's history she worked at level intervention targeting skill development, to create an enabling environment as well as networking and facilitating access for women entrepreneurs to local and export markets.

== Background ==
=== Early life ===
Roman Tesfaye was born in a small town near Wolaita Sodo called Gacheno, South Ethiopia Regional State, Ethiopia. She is of the Wolayta ethnic group of Ethiopia, the first largest in the Southern Nations, Nationalities, and People's Region (SNNPR). Her family belongs to the Apostolic Church of Ethiopia, a Oneness Pentecostal denomination that is not part of the mainstream Ethiopian Protestant Christianity (Pentay), which believes in Trinitarianism. Married to Hailemariam Desalegn, she is also well known to be both a religious and family woman.

=== Career list ===
- Lecturer of Economics at Arba Minch University
- Economic advisor of South Region's administration
- The Federal Ministry of Women Affairs
- Regional Secretariat for the National Poverty Reduction Strategy Paper Preparation
- Chair person of Stop Cervical, Breast and Prostate Cancer in Africa
- First Lady of Ethiopia
- Chair-person in Hailemariam and Roman Foundation (HRF)

=== Awards ===
Roman won the Scaling Up Nutrition Champion Awards in Abidjan, Ivory Coast on 8 November 2017 and handover the awards on 31 May 2018 at the Federal Ministry of Health, in the presence of Amir Aman, former minister of health, Kebede Worku, state minister of health and chair of the National Nutrition Coordinating Body (NNCB), Ekin Ogutogullari, country director of Save the Children in Ethiopia and chair of the Ethiopian Civil Society Coalition for Scaling-up Nutrition (ECSC-SUN) coalition members and other stakeholders.

== School feeding program ==
Mother of three daughters, Roman, who was the first lady between September 2012 and February 2018, takes an active role in the education and nutrition of children. Having grown up in the countryside, she believes that education is an effective way to break the cycle of poverty. After reading a report of the Addis Ababa Education Bureau in 2014 showing that thousands of children were about to drop out of school because of malnutrition, Roman sprang into action immediately.

In 2015, together with the China Foundation for Poverty Alleviation (CFPA), she initiated a school feeding program called Smiling Children Project covering 42 public primary schools in Addis Ababa. Today, the project has been providing free breakfast and lunch to 22,000 students in the capital.

According to studies, the school attendance rate for children taking part in this program rose to almost 99 percent. Their health status has improved, and their school performance is on the rise. Also within the framework of this project, 1,200 mothers who had no stable source of income were recruited to be in charge of the supply, preparation and distribution of food to students. In this way, the project benefits both women and children. Roman continues to be actively involved in efforts to raise funds so that more children can benefit from the initiative. While she is officially no longer the first lady of Ethiopia, Roman still works in this role.

== Foundation ==
Roman Tesfaye is now the chairperson of the Hailemariam and Roman Foundation. The foundation aims to develop the healthy of children's and mother's, nutrition of communities, promoting climate resilience and ecotourism and increasing the economic benefits of women and youth.

== See also ==
- First Lady of Ethiopia
