= Matthias Höfs =

German trumpeter (born 1965)

Matthias Höfs (born 1965 in Lübeck, Germany) is a German trumpeter.

== Education ==
When he was six years old, Höfs received his first trumpet and played in the wind band of the sports club of the city of Lübeck, Germany. In 1975, when he was ten years old, he began studying the trumpet with Professor Peter Kallensee. In 1982 he enrolled at the Hochschule für Musik und Theater Hamburg, where he continued his studies with Prof. Kallensee. In 1984 he transferred to the Karajan Academy of the Berlin Philharmonic Orchestra to study with Professor Konradin Groth. He graduated with distinction.

== Professional life ==
Upon graduation in 1984, he became the first trumpet with the Philharmoniker Hamburg. He joined the chamber ensemble the German Brass in 1985, as well as participating in chamber ensembles including the Linos Ensemble, the Deutschen Bläsersolisten, the Ensemble Villa Musica, and the Deutsche Kammerphilharmonie Bremen. He won several solo competitions, including the Hanseatic City Cultural Prize of Lübeck, Eduard Söhring prize in 1988 and the International Music Championship hosted in Markneukirchen. He also received scholarships from the German Musical Council and the Mozart Society. He released his first CD in 1995, Un Concerto Italiano (An Italian Concert). His role in the German Brass changed to include arranging for the group (with Enrique Crespo) as well as being a soloist.

== Teaching ==
In 2000, he left his position as soloist at the Philharmonic State Orchestra Hamburg to become professor of trumpet at the Hochschule für Musik und Theater in Hamburg. He has had guest professorships at music schools in several countries, including the Guildhall School of Music and Drama. He continues to work in Hamburg today with students from several countries, many of whom already hold orchestral positions.

== Recordings ==
Höfs has recorded seven albums of trumpet music under his own name, as well as being featured playing Hindemith's Concerto for bassoon, trumpet, and strings with the Kammerakademie Potsdam. His recorded repertoire includes baroque and contemporary, and his latest recording features music written by composer Wolf Kerschek.

== Equipment ==
Höfs plays on custom trumpets made by the Thein brothers in Bremen, Germany. He has helped design many of his own horns, as well as the commercially available MH One.

== Discography ==
- "Un concerto italiano"(1995)
- "An English Concert" (2002)
- "Twentieth Century Bassoon Concertos" (2005)
- "Gansch Meets Höfs" together with Hans Gansch (2006)
- "Trumpet Acrobatics" (2007)
- "The Trumpet Shall Sound" (2009)
- "Solo de Concours" (2010)
- "Adventures of a Trumpet" (2011)
- "Live in Japan" (2013)
- "Hommage!" (2014)
- "Fireworks" (2015)
- "Mozart con tromba" (2016)
- "Telemann Trompetenkonzerte" (2017)
- "Kinds of Gold" (2018)
- "Bach: Trumpet Concertos" (2019)
- "Oskar Böhme Trumpet Concerto & Pieces" (2022)
