= An die Hoffnung =

Lied for alto or mezzo-soprano and orchestra by Max Reger

- Lied by Max Reger
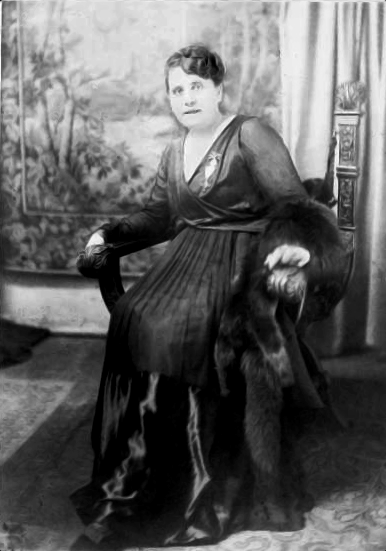
- Anna Erler-Schnaudt, the first singer of the orchestral song
- Opus: 124
- Language: German
- Composed: 1912
- Dedication: Anna Erler-Schnaudt
- Published: 1893: London
- Scoring: alto (or mezzo-soprano); orchestra (or piano)

"An die Hoffnung" (To Hope), Op. 124, is a Lied for alto or mezzo-soprano and orchestra by Max Reger, setting a poem by Friedrich Hölderlin. He composed it in Meiningen in 1912 and dedicated it to Anna Erler-Schnaudt, the singer of the first performance. It was published by Edition Peters the same year.

== History ==
Reger composed the orchestral song in Meiningen in 1912. He had an affinity to the alto voice, collaborating with the singer Anna Erler-Schnaudt whom he met probably in 1906. Reger dedicated the work to her, and she was the soloist in the first performance in Eisenach on 12 October 1912. The composer conducted the Meininger Hofkapelle. The song was published by Edition Peters the same year, the vocal score in September, the parts in November.

Reger requested the singer to perform in his memorial service in case of his death. She remained dedicated to him after his death, giving the autograph of the piano version of "An die Hoffnung" and several other memorabilia to the Max-Reger-Institute.

== Text and music ==
The poem was published in two versions, the first titled "Bitte" (Request), the second "An die Hoffnung". Reger combined the text of the first, making minor changes to the wording, with the title of the second.

Reger scored work for a low female voice (alto or mezzo-soprano), and an orchestra of two flutes, two oboes, two clarinets, two bassoons, four horns, two trumpets, three timpani and strings. The music is influenced by Wagner's Tristan und Isolde. Reger made a piano version.

== Recordings ==
Carl Schuricht conducted in 1955 the first recording, with Christa Ludwig and the NDR Symphony Orchestra, complementing Bruckner's Symphonies No. 7 and 8. Hermann Scherchen recorded it along with other works by Reger in 1960 with the Nordwestdeutsche Philharmonie and Margarethe Bence as the soloist. Leon Botstein conducted in 2001 a recording with Catherine Wyn-Rogers and the London Philharmonic Orchestra, complementing Reger works such as Vier Tondichtungen nach A. Böcklin.
