= Azeb Mesfin =

2nd First Lady of Ethiopia

- አዜብ መስፍን
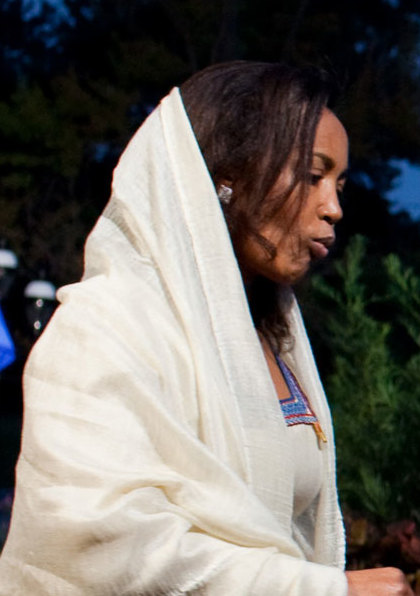
- Azeb in September 2009

2nd First Lady of Ethiopia
- In office 8 October 2001 – 20 August 2012
- President: Girma Wolde-Giorgis
- Prime Minister: Meles Zenawi
- Preceded by: Regina Abelt
- Succeeded by: Roman Tesfaye

Personal details
- Born: 21 December 1966 (age 59) Welkait, Tigray Province, Ethiopian Empire
- Party: Tigray People's Liberation Front
- Other political affiliations: Ethiopian People's Revolutionary Democratic Front
- Spouse: Meles Zenawi
- Children: 3

Azeb Mesfin Haile (Amharic and Tigrinya: አዜብ መስፍን ኃይሌ; born 21 December 1966) is an Ethiopian politician who was the second First Lady of Ethiopia from 2001 to 2012. Azeb is the widow of Ethiopian Prime Minister Meles Zenawi. She is the founder and patron of National Initiative for Mental Health of Ethiopia. In early 2009, she was appointed CEO of the Endowment Fund for the rehabilitation of Tigray by its head Abadi Zemu.

== Early life ==
Azeb was born in Welkait in the Tigray region, and was raised in Gadarif, Eastern Sudan. She is the daughter of an Amhara peasant farmer father Mesfin Haile and a Tigrayan mother Konjit Gola. Her maternal grandfather, Gola Goshu was an Italian Askari during the Second Italo-Ethiopian War (1935–1936). Due to his action in the country, Gola was killed by Ethiopian patriots. From an early age, Azeb was raised by her aunt Maniahlosh Gola who is the daughter of this "Fitawrari" a title given to Goshu by Italian invaders meaning Commander of the vanguard; a feudal era military title.

Azeb was married to Ethiopian Prime Minister Meles Zenawi until his death in 2012. Together they had three children: Semhal, Marda and Senay Meles.

== Career ==
She was elected in 2005 to the House of Peoples' Representatives (the lower House of the Ethiopian Parliament) representing her home woreda of Welkait and Humera, and serves as chair of its Social Affairs Standing Committee. Her role has at times been controversial, with some members of Ethiopian diaspora alleging that, during the period in which she was an executive at the parastatal Mega Corporation, she was involved in "the impropriety of mingling public, private and party-owned businesses."

However Azeb is also known for her work to teach rural Ethiopians about the issues of HIV/AIDS Her appearance at a special ceremony to honor the First Ladies of Africa for their efforts against the spread of HIV/AIDS held by Georgetown University of Washington DC on 15 January 2007 was met by protests of exiled Ethiopians." The University was awarding its "John Thompson Legacy of a Dream Award" to the Organization of African First Ladies against HIV/AIDS for its leadership and service toward the ideals of Dr. Martin Luther King, Jr. Mesfin was to accept the award on behalf of the organization along with the first ladies of Zambia and Rwanda.

She started the organization "Ethiopian Coalition of Women against HIV/AIDS" and continues to work closely with community leaders to ensure the rights of women, fight harmful traditional practices and HIV/AIDS. She said the award she received is not just for her organization but for the entire Ethiopian women declaring "the award is the result of the relentless struggle waged by Ethiopian women.

== See also ==
- First Lady of Ethiopia
