= Kunuz College =

Private college in Addis Ababa, Ethiopia

- Type: Private
- Established: 2002
- President: Tesfaye Lega
- Location: Addis Ababa, Ethiopia

Kunuz College is a private college in Ethiopia, located near Wingate Square, Addis Ababa. Established in 2002, the institution provides courses in Business, Accounting, Marketing, Human Resource Management, Information Technology, Law and Secretarial Science. The previous advisory of Kunuz College was formerly the president of Ethiopia, Dr. Negasso Gidada.

The college is a member of the Private Higher Education Institutions and provides Level 3 certificate and Level 4 diploma. Also, the college provides degree programs.

The Ministry of Education accredits the programs of the college. Admission of students is based on the criteria set by the Ministry of Education. The college has a student body of 800.

The president of Kunuz College is Mr. Tesfaye Lega.

== See also ==
- List of universities and colleges in Ethiopia
- Education in Ethiopia
