= Musikproduktion Dabringhaus und Grimm =

MDG or Musikproduktion Dabringhaus und Grimm (founded 1978) is a German classical record label based in Detmold run by recording engineers and producers Werner Dabringhaus and Reimund Grimm. MDG is notable for its premiere recordings of works by German-language composers that have been forgotten, such as the sonatas and other chamber works of Paul Hindemith, piano pieces by Ignaz Moscheles, and choral and chamber works by Magdalene Schauss-Flake.
