= Vladimir Djambazov =

Bulgarian composer, arranger and sound designer

Djambazov in c. 2007

Vladimir Djambazov (Bulgarian: Владимир Джамбазов; born 28 October 1954) is a Bulgarian composer, arranger and sound designer. He was born in Sevlievo, Bulgaria.

== Education ==
He first studied at the Music academy in Sofia with Karel Stary. He then won a DAAD scholarship and graduated from the Folkwang Hochschule in Essen, Germany, having studied electronic music composition and sound design with Dirk Reith (ICEM) and horn with Hermann Baumann. He later specialized in electronic music and new media at ICEM, Essen, Germany.

== Career ==
Djambazov composes in many genres and styles – from electro-acoustic and acousmatic to solo, chamber and symphonic music, feature film, animation, jazz, music for the stage, and new media.

He participated in many festivals as the Synthese (France), Elektronischer Fühling, Wien Modern and Elektrokomplex (Austria), November Music (Germany/Belgium/Netherlands), BIMESP (Brazil), Musica Scienza (Italy), FEMF (U.S.A), the ISCM World New Music Days (Hong Kong, Slovenia), the SICMF (Korea), Musica Viva (Portugal) and NYCEMF (U.S.A.).

His music has been aired and performed by many European and Asian broadcast companies. Labels such Monopol, Cybele, RZ Edition and Erdenklang published his music on CD and DVD.

In 2005 he was artist-in-residence of the Berlin artistic program of DAAD, Germany. In 2009 he was one of the 13 European composers selected to participate in the NYCEMF in Manhattan, NY, USA. Since 2009 Vladimir is co-hosting the radio show "Viva La Musica" of the Bulgarian National Radio, one of the TOP 5 music radio shows in Europe for 2011 and holder of the highest Bulgarian radio award "Sirak Skitnik"

Vladimir won twice in а row the Grand Prix of the International composing competition "7/8" of the St. George Foundation, USA: in 2012 (Jazz in 7/8) with "KÁRIA" for Clarinet, Trumpet/Fluegelhorn and Symphony Orchestra and in 2013 (Rhapsody in 7/8) with "Footsteps"- a Bulgarian Dance Rhapsody for symphony orchestra. In 2014 he composed Un Viaggio in Italia, a choral-symphonic work with solo soprano.

Vladimir Djambazov has taught on Audio design and Stage music at the Sofia University.

In 2024 Vladimir received one of the highest awards of the Bulgarian Ministry of culture "for overall contribution to the development of Bulgarian culture". Djambazov is the Secretary General of the Union of Bulgarian composers (Since 2014).
