= Carlos Orta =

Carlos Orta (1944–2004) was a dancer, choreographer and teacher with the José Limón Dance Company in New York since 1979.

== Biography ==
Mr. Orta was born in Caracas, Venezuela, and trained at the Scola Cantorum in Paris. He also later studied with Pina Bausch at Germany's Folkwang Hochschule.

He was the founder and director of the Corearte Dance Company of Venezuela, a dance troupe which performed his original moves, often based on Venezuelan folk dances.

He won the International Academy of Dance's choreography award in Cologne, Germany, and Venezuela's Prize of Dance. Orta also taught at Long Island University and Manhattanville College.
