= Magdalene Schauss-Flake =

Magdalene Schauss-Flake (25 July 1921 – 24 September 2008) was a German composer and organist who gave recitals throughout the United States and Europe.

== Biography ==
Schauss-Flake was born in Essen, where she studied church music at the Folkwang School while working as a jazz musician in bars. Her teachers included Hans Chemin-Petit, Siegfried Reda, and Ludwig Weber. She married a minister named Schauss and they had three children. Schauss-Flake taught at a music academy in Szczecin, Poland, and worked as a church musician in Germany in Anklam, Essen-Altendorf, and Essen-Kupferdreh. She gave organ recitals throughout the United States and Europe. She is buried in Burgsponheim, Germany.

Schauss-Flake’s works have been recorded commercially on LPs by Capella 3 (today known as Cantate); Carus-Verlag; Lauda; and MDG (Musikproduktion Dabringhaus Und Grimm). Her compositions are published by Carus-Verlag, Presto Music, Strube Musikverlag, and Tezak Verlag. Her works include:

== Chamber ==
- Serenade (4 trombones)
- Suite in G (brass and woodwinds)
- Variationen ueber das Lied ‘es ist ein Schnitter (trombone and narrator)
- Variationen ueber ein Thema von Anton Dvorak (trumpet and trombone)

== Vocal ==
- “Befiehl dem Herrn deine Wege”
- Der Morgensternn ist aufgedrungen (soprano, choir, and 6 wind instruments; text by Daniel Rumpius)
- “Du meine Seele singe”
- “Jauchzet dem Herrn, alle Welt” (Psalm 100)
- “Jauchzet, ihr Himmel”
- “Nun lasst uns Gott, dem Herren”
- Ohren gabst du mir (choir; text by Paul Ernst Ruppel)
