= Hans Dammers =

German World War II fighter pilot (1913–1944)

- Dammers as a Feldwebel
- Born: 8 December 1913; Scherpenberg near Moers
- Died: 17 March 1944 (aged 30); Stanislau
- Military career
- Allegiance: Nazi Germany
- Branch: Luftwaffe
- Rank: Leutnant (posthumous)
- Units: JG 52, EJGr Ost
- Conflicts: World War II
- Awards: Knight's Cross of the Iron Cross

Hans Dammers (8 August 1913 – 17 March 1944) was a German Luftwaffe military aviator during World War II. As a fighter ace, he was credited with 113 aerial victories claimed in an unknown number of combat missions. During his numerous ground attack missions he destroyed eleven aircraft, eight locomotives, 39 horse-drawn wagons, 34 trucks, three anti-aircraft emplacements and one armored reconnaissance vehicle.

Born in Scherpenberg near Moers, Dammers was trained as a fighter pilot and was posted to Jagdgeschwader 52 (JG 52—52nd Fighter Wing) in 1941. Fighting on the Eastern Front, he claimed his first aerial victory on 31 August 1941 during Operation Barbarossa, the German invasion of the Soviet Union. On 23 August 1942, Dammers was awarded the Knight's Cross of the Iron Cross for 58 aerial victories claimed. He was credited with his 100th aerial victory on 5 May 1943. He then served as an instructor with Ergänzungs-Jagdgruppe Ost, a supplementary fighter pilot training unit. In January 1944, he was posted to 9. Staffel (9th squadron) of JG 52. Dammers died on 17 March 1944 in a hospital at Stanislau from wounds sustained in a mid-air collision.

== Career ==
Dammers was born on 8 December 1913 in Scherpenberg, present-day a borough of Moers, at the time in the Rhine Province of the German Empire. Following flight training as a fighter pilot, (Note: Flight training in the Luftwaffe progressed through the levels A1, A2 and B1, B2, referred to as A/B flight training. A training included theoretical and practical training in aerobatics, navigation, long-distance flights and dead-stick landings. The B courses included high-altitude flights, instrument flights, night landings and training to handle the aircraft in difficult situations.) he was posted to the 7. Staffel (7th squadron) of Jagdgeschwader 52 (JG 52—52nd Fighter Wing), a squadron of III. Gruppe (3rd group) of JG 52, in the summer of 1941.

=== War against the Soviet Union ===
Following its brief deployment in the Balkan Campaign, III. Gruppe was ordered to Bucharest by mid-June. There, the unit was subordinated to the Luftwaffenmission Rumänien (Luftwaffe Mission Romania) and reequipped with the new, more powerful Messerschmitt Bf 109 F-4 model. On 21 June 1941, the Gruppe was ordered to Mizil in preparation of Operation Barbarossa, the German invasion of the Soviet Union. Its primary objective was to provide fighter protection for the oil fields and refineries at Ploiești. Prior to the invasion, Major Gotthard Handrick was replaced by Major Albert Blumensaat as commander of III. Gruppe. Blumensaat was then replaced by Hauptmann Hubertus von Bonin on 1 October. At the time, von Bonin was still in convalescence so that Hauptmann Franz Höring, the commander of 9. Staffel, was also made the acting Gruppenkommandeur (group commander). On 27 August, III. Gruppe had reached an airfield named Stschastliwaja located approximately 20 kilometers (12 miles) east-southeast of Oleksandriia. There, Dammers claimed his first aerial victory on 31 August over a Polikarpov I-16 fighter aircraft. The following day, he was credited with another I-16 fighter shot down.

On 24 September, III. Gruppe moved to the Poltava Air Base, supporting the 17th Army in the First Battle of Kharkov. On 14 October, Dammers claimed his third aerial victory over another I-16 fighter. Three days later, he claimed an I-26 fighter, an early Luftwaffe designation for a Yakovlev Yak-1 fighter. On 23 October, III. Gruppe moved from Poltava to Chaplynka. The following day, he claimed a Polikarpov I-15 fighter aircraft near Ishun. On 2 November, the Gruppe moved to Taganrog where they stayed until 1 January 1942. During this period, Dammers claimed two I-16 fighters on 6 December, another I-16 fighter on 9 December, and his last claim in 1941, a further I-16 fighter, on 27 December.

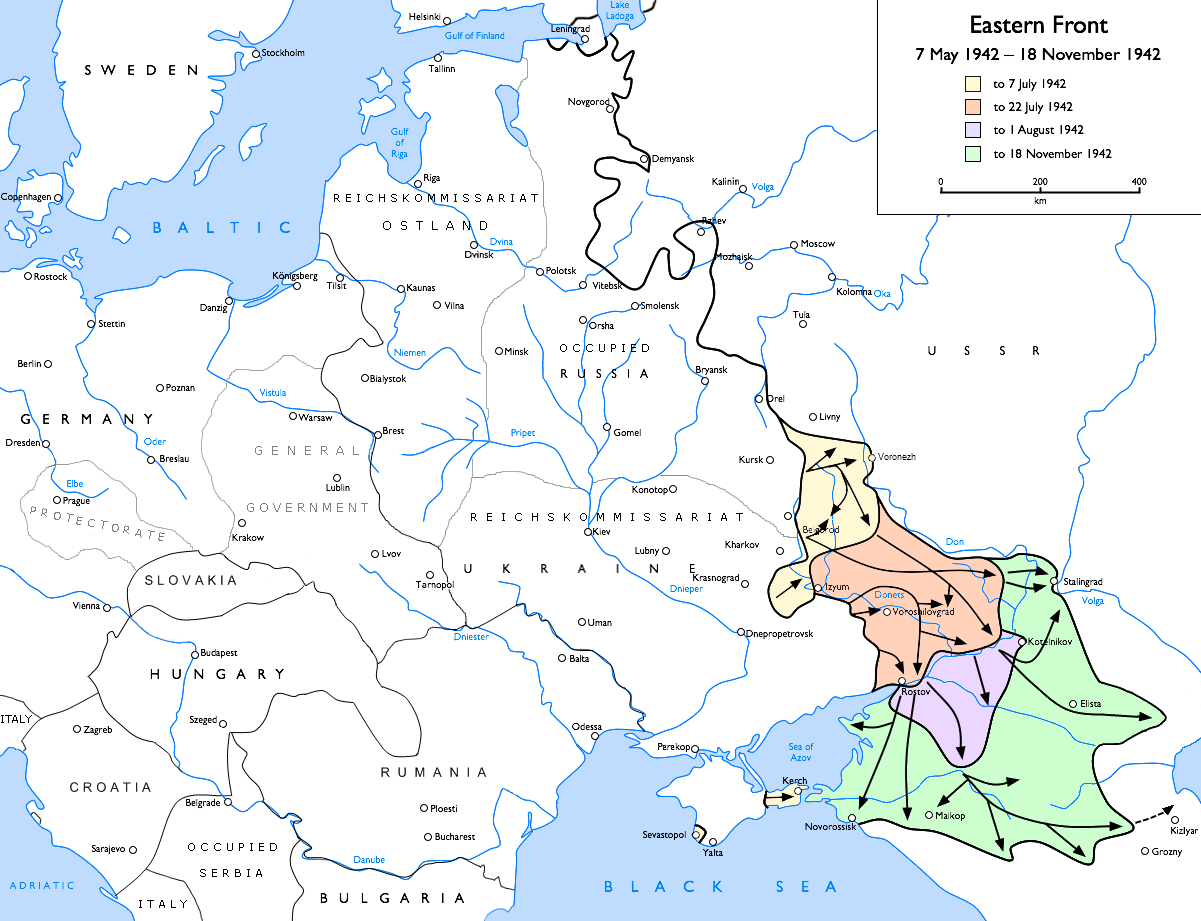
The German advance: May to November 1942. to 7 July to 22 July to 1 August to 18 November

On 29 April, III. Gruppe had relocated to Zürichtal, a small village at the Inhul in the former German settlement west of Feodosia in the Crimea during the Crimean campaign. On 1 May, the Gruppe was subordinated to VIII. Fliegerkorps and was supporting the 11th Army in the Battle of the Kerch Peninsula and the Siege of Sevastopol. That day, he claimed his first aerial victory of 1942 and tenth in total when he shot down a Mikoyan-Gurevich MiG-1 fighter. Operating from Zürichtal, Dammers claimed eight further aerial victories, increasing his total to 18 victories claimed. On 12 May, III. Gruppe relocated again and was ordered to an airfield named Kharkov-Rogan, 10 kilometers (6.2 miles) east of Kharkov where they participated in the Second Battle of Kharkov. The next day, Dammers claimed three aerial victories over MiG-1 fighters in the combat area of Staryi Saltiv on the Donets. Over the next weeks, III. Gruppe was moved several times. On 19 May, the Gruppe moved to Barvinkove where they stayed until 12 June mostly fighting over the encircled Soviet forces in the Izium salient. Here, Dammers claimed an Ilyushin Il-2 ground-attack aircraft and three Petlyakov Pe-2 bombers on 26 May.

The Grupp was then ordered to Belgorod and to Grakowo, located approximately halfway between Kharkov and Kupiansk, on 22 June. That day, Dammers became an "ace-in-a-day" for the first time when shot down five Soviet fighter aircraft. On 28 June, German forces had launched Case Blue, the strategic summer offensive in southern Russia. On 7 July, Army Group A began their advance towards the oil fields in the Caucasus. On 10 July, Dammers was awarded the German Cross in Gold (Deutsches Kreuz in Gold). Three days later, III. Gruppe moved to an airfield at Luhanske. There on 17 July, Dammers (flying Bf 109 G-2 Werknummer 13435—factory number) and his wingman Unteroffizier Kurt Keser jumped Soviet Yak-1 fighter pilot (then Starshiy Leytenant) Aleksandr Pokryshkin, but the future second highest scoring Soviet ace managed to shoot both down. Keser was killed and Dammers bailed out.

On 19 July, III. Gruppe moved to Taganrog, staying there until 29 July. Dammers continued his successes, shooting down two Lavochkin-Gorbunov-Gudkov LaGG-3s on 28 July, and on 6 August 1942 he claimed an Polikarpov I-153 biplane fighter and two LaGG-3s. Dammers was awarded the Knight's Cross of the Iron Cross (Ritterkreuz des Eisernen Kreuzes) on 23 August 1942, nominated after 51 aerial victories. The presentation was made by Hermann Graf. On 27 August, III. Gruppe reached an airfield named Gonschtakowka located north-northeast of Mozdok on the Terek. There Dammers became an "ace-in-a-day" for the second time on 5 September over five Curtiss P-40 Warhawk fighters which took his total to 63 aerial victories claimed. On 19 September, III. Gruppe reached an airfield named Soldatskaya, west of Mozdok. The Gruppe would remain here until 1 January 1943 but would also use airfields at Mozdok and Digora. Operating from Soldatskaya, Dammers increased his number of aerial victories to 75 by 18 September. By the end of 1942, his total number of aerial victories had increased to 89, making him the fourth most successful fighter pilot of III. Gruppe.

On 15 March 1943, Dammers' 7. Staffel was placed under the command of Oberleutnant Walter Krupinski. The Gruppe was moved to the combat area of the Kuban bridgehead on 1 April 1943 where it was based at an airfield at Taman. Operating from Taman until 2 July, III. Gruppe also flew missions from Kerch on 12 May, from Sarabuz and Saky on 14 May, Zürichtal, present-day Solote Pole, a village near the urban settlement Kirovske on 23 May, and Yevpatoria on 25/26 June. On 5 May 1943, Dammers was credited with his 100th aerial victory, claiming two LaGG fighters that day. He was the 39th Luftwaffe pilot to achieve the century mark.

=== Fighter pilot instructor and death ===
Karaya emblem

In May 1943, Dammers transferred to Ergänzungs-Jagdgruppe Ost, specialized training unit for new fighter pilots destined for the Eastern Front, as an instructor. On 23 July, he was severely injured in a ground accident when his Bf 109 overturned at Laleu Airfield. Following his recovery, he was transferred to 9. Staffel of JG 52, also known as the Karaya-Staffel, of JG 52 in January 1944. At the time, 9. Staffel was under the command of Oberleutnant Erich Hartmann. This Staffel was also subordinated to III. Gruppe of JG 52. Its commanding officer von Bonin had been replaced by Hauptmann Günther Rall on 5 July 1943.

III. Gruppe was based at Mala Vyska in early January 1944. On night of 9/10 January, the airfield was overrun by Soviet T-34 tanks and had to be abandoned in a hurry. The Gruppe then moved to an airfield at Novokrasne located approximately 35 kilometers (22 miles) east of Pervomaisk. The Gruppe stayed in Mala Vyska until 22 February when it withdrew to Uman. On 6 March, II. Gruppe headed to Kalynivka and to Vinnytsia on 8 March and then to Proskuriv on 12 March. There, Dammers claimed his last two aerial victories, a LaGG fighter on 12 March and another the following day.

Dammers' Bf 109 G-6 (Werknummer 20162—factory number) "yellow 9" was struck on 13 March 1944 by debris from a shot down Lavochkin La-5 near Oleschyn. Dammers bailed out but his parachute got caught on his wing. Dammers succumbed to his injuries and died in hospital on 17 March 1944 in Stanislau, present-day Ivano-Frankivsk. He was posthumously promoted to Leutnant (second lieutenant). Dammers was married to Gertrud Dammers, née Falkenburg. The couple had two sons, Manfred and Hans-Joachim.

== Summary of career ==
=== Aerial victory claims ===
According to US historian David T. Zabecki, Dammers was credited with 113 aerial victories. Authors Obermaier and Spick also list Dammers with 113 aerial victories claimed in an unknown number combat missions, plus further 23 unwitnessed claims. In numerous ground attack missions, he destroyed eleven aircraft, eight locomotives, 39 horse-drawn wagons, 34 trucks, three anti-aircraft emplacements and one armored reconnaissance vehicle. Mathews and Foreman, authors of Luftwaffe Aces — Biographies and Victory Claims, researched the German Federal Archives and found records for 103 aerial victory claims, all of which claimed on the Eastern Front.

Victory claims were logged to a map-reference (PQ = Planquadrat), for example "PQ 06894". The Luftwaffe grid map (Jägermeldenetz) covered all of Europe, western Russia and North Africa and was composed of rectangles measuring 15 minutes of latitude by 30 minutes of longitude, an area of about 360 square miles (930 km^{2}). These sectors were then subdivided into 36 smaller units to give a location area 3 km × 4 km (1.9 mi × 2.5 mi) in size.

Chronicle of aerial victories
This and the ♠ (Ace of spades) indicates those aerial victories which made Dammers an "ace-in-a-day", a term which designates a fighter pilot who has shot down five or more airplanes in a single day. This and the ? (question mark) indicates information discrepancies listed by Prien, Stemmer, Rodeike, Bock, Mathews and Foreman.
Claim	Date	Time	Type	Location	Claim	Date	Time	Type	Location
– Claims with 7. Staffel of Jagdgeschwader 52 – Operation Barbarossa — 22 June – 5 December 1941
1	31 August 1941	10:11	I-16		4	17 October 1941	07:27	I-26 (Yak-1)	
2	1 September 1941	18:15	I-16		5	24 October 1941	12:50	I-15	vicinity of Ishun
3	14 October 1941	16:51	I-16						
– Claims with 7. Staffel of Jagdgeschwader 52 – Winter War — 6 December 1941 – 28 April 1942
6	6 December 1941	08:25	I-16		8	9 December 1941	08:58	I-16	
7	6 December 1941	13:51	I-16		9	27 December 1941	11:20	I-16	
– Claims with 7. Staffel of Jagdgeschwader 52 – Eastern Front — 29 April 1942 – 3 February 1943
10	29 April 1942	17:39	MiG-1		50	27 July 1942	07:01	R-5	
11	30 April 1942	13:34	I-61 (MiG-3)		51	28 July 1942	18:35	LaGG-3	
12	2 May 1942	18:08	I-16		52	28 July 1942	18:35	LaGG-3	
13	3 May 1942	07:08	I-16		53	6 August 1942	11:02	I-153	PQ 06894
14	5 May 1942	18:18? (Note: According to Mathews and Foreman claimed at 12:39.)	I-16		54	6 August 1942	13:15	LaGG-3	PQ 05233
15	8 May 1942	15:43	MiG-1		55	6 August 1942	13:19	LaGG-3	PQ 16774, west of Armawir
16	8 May 1942	15:48	MiG-1		56	15 August 1942	08:29	LaGG-3	PQ 34412
17	9 May 1942	12:24	MiG-1		57	15 August 1942	08:35	LaGG-3	PQ 34434
18	9 May 1942	12:29	Yak-1		58	31 August 1942	16:03? (Note: According to Mathews and Foreman claimed at 16:12.)	LaGG-3	PQ 49392; 25 km (16 mi) south of Stalingrad
19	13 May 1942	11:25	MiG-1		59♠	5 September 1942	09:35	P-40	PQ 49294; 40 km (25 mi) east of Stalingrad
20	13 May 1942	14:12	MiG-1	3 km (1.9 mi) southwest of Staryi Saltiv vicinity of Saltow	60♠	5 September 1942	09:38	P-40	PQ 59321
21	13 May 1942	14:23	MiG-1		61♠	5 September 1942	09:45	P-40	PQ 59193
22	14 May 1942	04:12	MiG-1		62♠	5 September 1942	12:40	P-40	PQ 49411; 5 km (3.1 mi) east of Stalingrad
23	14 May 1942	04:14	MiG-1		63♠	5 September 1942	12:43	P-40	PQ 49413 vicinity of Krasnaya Sloboda
24	14 May 1942	11:22	I-16		64	8 September 1942	06:11	Yak-1	PQ 49294; 25 km (16 mi) east of Stalingrad
25	16 May 1942	07:25	MiG-1		65	13 September 1942	16:07	Il-2	PQ 49331 over Stalingrad
26	16 May 1942	07:26	MiG-1		66	14 September 1942	12:33	Yak-1	PQ 49362; 10 km (6.2 mi) south of Stalingrad
27	17 May 1942	17:03	MiG-1		67	14 September 1942	16:02	LaGG-3	PQ 49272; 5 km (3.1 mi) east of Stalingrad
28	18 May 1942	10:25	MiG-1		68	14 September 1942	16:12	LaGG-3	PQ 49413 vicinity of Krasnaya Sloboda
29	18 May 1942	10:25	MiG-1		69	15 September 1942	04:57	La-5	PQ 49283; 20–30 km (12–19 mi) east of Stalingrad
30	19 May 1942	07:58	MiG-1		70	15 September 1942	14:08	LaGG-3	PQ 49411; 5 km (3.1 mi) east of Stalingrad
31	24 May 1942	17:52	MiG-1		71	15 September 1942	14:15	LaGG-3	PQ 49274; 10 km (6.2 mi) east of Stalingrad
32	26 May 1942	11:13	Il-2		72	17 September 1942	12:40	LaGG-3	PQ 49412; 5 km (3.1 mi) east of Stalingrad
33	26 May 1942	15:38	Pe-2		73	17 September 1942	16:51	LaGG-3	PQ 49424; 25 km (16 mi) east of Stalingrad
34	26 May 1942	15:47	Pe-2		74	18 September 1942	14:25	La-5	PQ 49133; 10 km (6.2 mi) north of Grebenka
35	26 May 1942	15:53	Pe-2	east of Izium	75	18 September 1942	14:29	LaGG-3	PQ 49212 northeast of Grebenka
36	31 May 1942	16:44	I-16		76	20 September 1942	06:58	Yak-1	PQ 40742
37	1 June 1942	06:52	LaGG-3		77	20 September 1942	07:02	Yak-1	PQ 40743
38	1 June 1942	06:56	LaGG-3		78	22 September 1942	14:37	Yak-1	PQ 49423; 25 km (16 mi) east of Stalingrad
39♠	22 June 1942	08:30	MiG-1		79	22 September 1942	14:38	Yak-1	PQ 49401 vicinity of Kurpjok
40♠	22 June 1942	08:34	MiG-1		80	22 September 1942	14:56	Yak-1	PQ 49413 vicinity of Krasnaya Sloboda
41♠	22 June 1942	14:16	LaGG-3		81	23 September 1942	16:30	Yak-1	PQ 40794; 15 km (9.3 mi) north of Grebenka
42♠	22 June 1942	14:34	Hurricane		82	23 September 1942	16:34	Yak-1	PQ 40753; 30 km (19 mi) north of Gumrak
43♠	22 June 1942	14:40	Hurricane		83	25 September 1942	16:15	Yak-1	PQ 40734; 35–40 km (22–25 mi) north of Grebenka
44	23 June 1942	16:37	MiG-1		84	24 November 1942	11:54	LaGG-3	PQ 43213
45	25 June 1942	07:53	MiG-1		85	28 November 1942	13:40	LaGG-3	PQ 44761
46	17 July 1942	10:12	I-15		86	28 November 1942	13:41	Il-2	PQ 44733
47	21 July 1942	07:26	MiG-1		87	28 November 1942	13:50? (Note: According to Mathews and Foreman claimed at 13:49.)	LaGG-3	PQ 44593
48	21 July 1942	12:40	LaGG-3		88	29 November 1942	13:36	MiG-1	PQ 44761
49	21 July 1942	12:46	LaGG-3		89	29 November 1942	13:40	MiG-1	PQ 44734
– Claims with 7. Staffel of Jagdgeschwader 52 – Eastern Front — 4 February – 31 December 1943
90	20 March 1943	06:40	Pe-2	PQ 34 Ost 66493 lake north of Cape Achileon	96? (Note: This claim is not listed by Prien, Stemmer, Rodeike, and Bock.)	28 April 1943	17:36	LaGG	north of Mertschanskaja
91	16 April 1943	14:45	P-39	PQ 34 Ost 85114 vicinity of Mertschanskaja	97	29 April 1943	17:10	LaGG-3	PQ 34 Ost 75263 vicinity of Nowo-Bakanskaja
92	18 April 1943	16:17	LaGG-3	PQ 34 Ost 75451; 8 km (5.0 mi) south of Novorossiysk	98	3 May 1943	13:35	LaGG-3	PQ 34 Ost 85151, northeast of Abinskaja vicinity of Abinsk
93	23 April 1943	17:11	LaGG-3	PQ 34 Ost 75411 vicinity of Vasilyevka	99	4 May 1943	09:10	P-39	PQ 34 Ost 85112 north of Mertschanskaja
94	27 April 1943	17:19	LaGG-3	PQ 34 Ost 85114, east of Krymskaja vicinity of Mertschanskaja	100	5 May 1943	11:01	LaGG-3	PQ 34 Ost 85181 northeast of Usun
95	28 April 1943	13:18	LaGG-3	PQ 34 Ost 85172, southwest of Abinskaja southwest of Abinsk	101	5 May 1943	11:08	LaGG-3	PQ 34 Ost 85123 east of Mertschanskaja
– Claims with 9. Staffel of Jagdgeschwader 52 – Eastern Front — March 1944
102	12 March 1944	16:40	LaGG	PQ 25 Ost 7035	103	13 March 1944	08:50	LaGG	PQ 25 Ost 60632 vicinity of Balakliia

=== Awards ===
- Iron Cross (1939) 2nd and 1st Class
- Honor Goblet of the Luftwaffe on 29 June 1942 as Unteroffizier and pilot
- German Cross in Gold on 10 July 1942 as Unteroffizier in the 7./Jagdgeschwader 52 (Note: According to Obermaier on 20 July 1942.)
- Knight's Cross of the Iron Cross on 23 August 1942 as Feldwebel and pilot in the 9./Jagdgeschwader 52 (Note: According to Scherzer as pilot in the 7./Jagdgeschwader 52.)
