= Regina Abelt =

1st First Lady of Ethiopia

Her Excellency Regina Abelt
- ረጃይና ዐበልት

1st First Lady of Ethiopia
- In office 22 August 1995 – 8 October 2001
- President: Negasso Gidada
- Prime Minister: Meles Zenawi
- Succeeded by: Azeb Mesfin

Personal details
- Born: 12 May 1954 (age 71) Moers, North Rhine-Westphalia, West Germany
- Citizenship: Germany
- Spouse: Negasso Gidada

Regina Abelt (Amharic: ረጃይና ዐበልት; born 12 May 1954) is a German-born public figure who served as the first First Lady of Ethiopia from 22 August 1995 until 8 October 2001.

== Background ==
Abelt was born in Germany. She worked as an aid worker in Rwanda from 1979 to 1983. Abelt was one of the many foreign nurses working in the western Oromia Region where she met her future husband, Dr. Negasso Gidada, who was also a student at Germany's Goethe University Frankfurt. Even though she held German citizenship, Regina became the First Lady of Ethiopia by virtue of her marriage to the then President Dr. Negasso.

== See also ==
- First Lady of Ethiopia
