= Zinash Tayachew =

4th First Lady of Ethiopia

Her Excellency Zinash Tayachew
- ዝናሽ ታያቸው
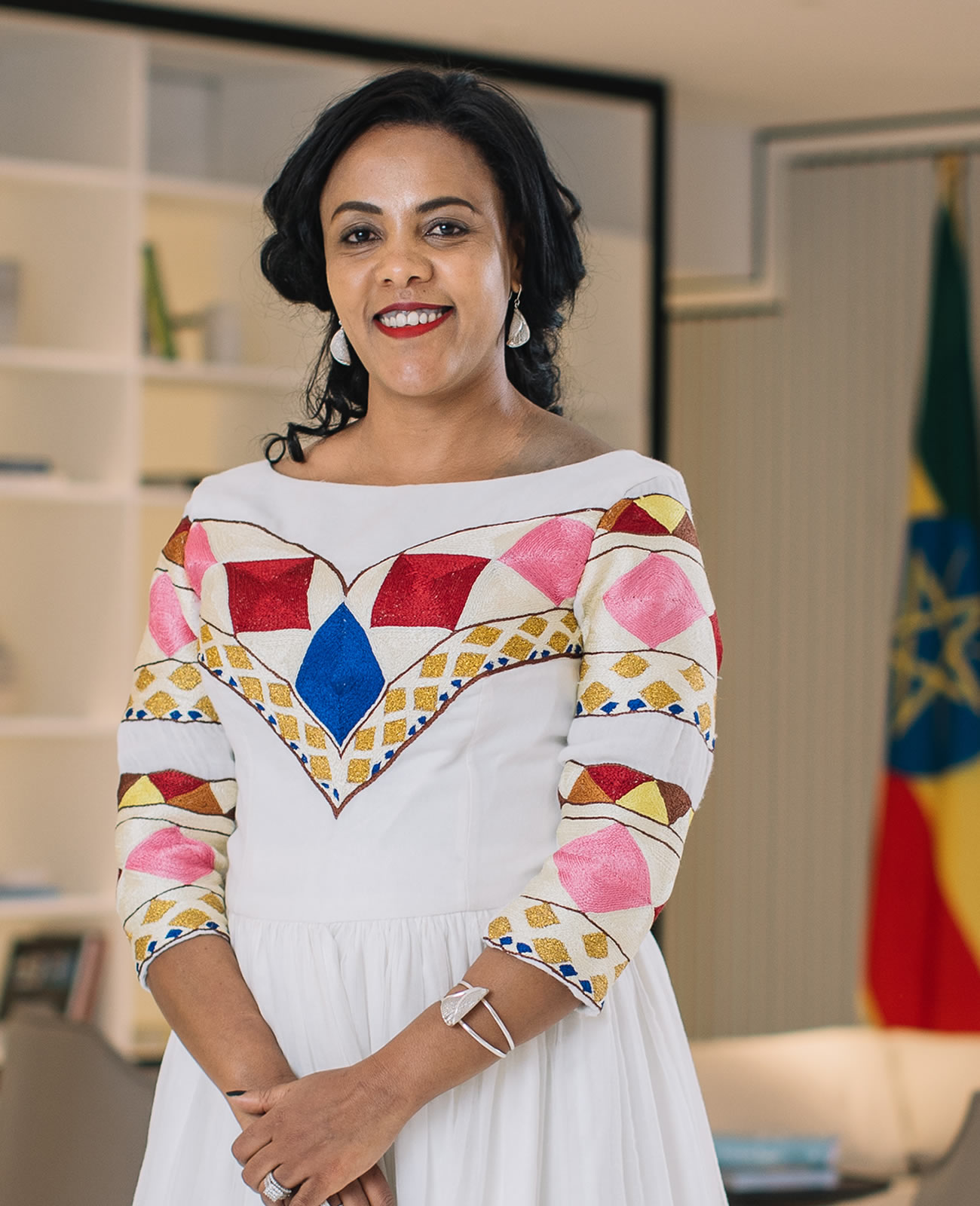
- Official portrait, 2025

4th First Lady of Ethiopia
- Incumbent
- Assumed role 2 April 2018
- Prime Minister: Abiy Ahmed
- Preceded by: Roman Tesfaye

Personal details
- Born: 25 January 1978 (age 48) Gondar, Ethiopia
- Party: Prosperity
- Spouse: Abiy Ahmed
- Children: 4
- Occupation: Philanthropist; gospel singer

Zinash Tayachew (Amharic: ዝናሽ ታያቸው; born 25 January 1978) is an Ethiopian politician, philanthropist and gospel singer. She is the wife of the Ethiopian Prime Minister Abiy Ahmed and the fourth First Lady of Ethiopia. Zinash is a devout Protestant Christian ministering at her church as a gospel singer.

== Life and career ==
Zinash Tayachew was born on 13 January 1978, in the city of Gondar. Upon graduation from Fasiledes Secondary School in Gondar, Zinash Tayachew joined military service where she would meet her future husband, the current Prime Minister of Ethiopia, Abiy Ahmed Ali. Prior to her role as the First Lady, Zinash Tayachew lived with their three daughters in Denver, Colorado.

Zinash and Abiy have three daughters, Deborah, Rakeb, and Amen. The couple adopted their 5 year old son named Million Abiy in August 2018.

== See also ==
- First Lady of Ethiopia
- Abiy Ahmed
