= David Kamp =

German sound designer

David Kamp (born 1982, Hamburg, Germany) is a composer, sound designer and sound artist living and working in Berlin. He studied Electronic Composition at ICEM Folkwang University of the Arts and has worked with visual artists, animation directors, companies and cultural institutions on award-winning animated films, adverts, installations and exhibitions. He gave talks, lectures and workshops at universities and conferences including Pictoplasma, Playgrounds and Hochschule für Gestaltung Offenbach.

Awards include multiple music & sound awards, "Young Guns Award" from the Art Directors Club of New York and a nomination for the German Film Music Awards.
