= Ludwig Weber =

Austrian opera singer

Ludwig Weber (July 29, 1899 – December 9, 1974) was an Austrian bass.

Ludwig Weber was born in Vienna in 1899. He initially planned to pursue a career as a teacher and artist when he discovered his vocal promise and decided to pursue an opera career. In 1919 he began studies with Alfred Borrotau, a well-respected teacher, and had his professional debut in 1920 at the Vienna Volksoper where he sang for a few years in smaller roles.

Possessing one of the largest dark-and-cavernous-type bass voices of the twentieth century, Weber was in equally high demand for villainous roles and noble characters. He was a prominent exponent of the vocal technique known as "Bayreuth bark". In the mid-1920s Weber was singing in mid-size to leading roles with smaller companies throughout Germany. After a successful appearance at the Munich Wagner Festival of 1931 he joined the Bavarian State Opera in Munich in 1933 and soon began to receive invitations to sing abroad. In 1936 he joined the Royal Opera at Covent Garden where he sang numerous roles for several years including: Pogner, Gurnemanz, Hunding, Hagen, Daland, King Marke, Osmin, Rocco, and Commendatore. In 1945 he became a member of the Vienna State Opera, where he sang a wide repertoire for the next two decades. He became particularly associated with the roles of Richard Wagner. The title role in Boris Godunov was one of Weber's favorites, and excerpts (sung in German) survive from a performance broadcast on radio. He sang the role in multiple houses including Covent Garden in 1950. He became a regular performer at the Bayreuth Festival from 1951 to 1962, and he also appeared a number of times at the Teatro Colón in Buenos Aires. Weber retired from the stage in 1965, by which time he had already started to teach at the Mozarteum in Salzburg (1961). His students included Magdalene Schauss-Flake.

== Selected discography ==
- Aida: Joseph Keilberth and the Reichssenders Orchestra Stuttgart singing the role of Ramphis
- Boris Godunov: excerpts only with Carl Leonhardt and the Reichssenders Orchestra Stuttgart, singing the title role
- Don Giovanni: with Rudolf Moralt (1955) singing the role of the Commendatore
- Der fliegende Holländer: with Hans Knappertsbusch (1955) singing the role of Daland
- Götterdämmerung: excerpts only with Wilhelm Furtwängler (1937) singing the role of Hagen
- Götterdammerung: with Rudolf Moralt (1949) singing the role of Hagen
- Götterdammerung: with Hans Knappertsbusch (1951) singing the role of Hagen
- The Magic Flute: with Herbert von Karajan (1950) singing the role of Sarastro
- Die Meistersinger von Nürnberg: with Hans Rosbaud (Milan, 1955) singing the role of Pogner the goldsmith
- Die Meistersinger von Nürnberg: with Hans Knappertsbusch (1960) singing the role of Fritz Kothner the baker
- Mozart/Sussmayr Requiem with Jascha Horenstein
- Parsifal: with Hans Knappertsbusch (1951) singing the role of Gurnemanz
- Parsifal: with Clemens Krauss (1953) singing the role of Gurnemanz
- Das Rheingold: with Joseph Keilberth (1955) singing the role of Fasolt
- Der Ring des Nibelungen: with Wilhelm Furtwängler (1950) singing the roles of Fasolt, Hunding, Fafner and Hagen
- Der Rosenkavalier: with Erich Kleiber (1954) singing the role of Baron Ochs
- Tristan und Isolde: with Herbert von Karajan (1952) singing the role of King Marke

== External sources ==
- Encyclopedia.com entry
- Singing the role of Commendatore in Mozart's DON GIOVANNI, with George London, audio only, YouTube
