= Daniel Rumpius =

German Lutheran theologian (1549–1600)

Daniel Rumpius (or Daniel Rump; 1549 – c. 1600) was a German Lutheran theologian, minister and hymnwriter.

Rump worked in Stepenitz, now part of Marienfließ, and at the nuns' monastery there, Nonnenstift Marienfließ which had turned Protestant. He wrote several sacred songs and hymns, partly adapted from secular models. He suffered a fire in his village, losing his property, and was severely sick. Reconvalescent, he began again to write poetry, calling it "singing songs with tears" ("mit Tränen Lieder zu singen").

He published in Uelzen in 1587 the song booklet Liedbüchlein / Darinn begriffen Lehre / Trost / Vermanung … including doctrine, consolation and admonition. Only one copy is extant, held by the Herzog August Bibliothek in Wolfenbüttel. One of its songs, the Advent "Der Morgenstern ist aufgedrungen" with a melody by Michael Praetorius, is part of the current Protestant hymnal Evangelisches Gesangbuch as EG 69.

== Literature ==
- Konrad Ameln, Ernst Sommer: Das Liedbüchlein des Daniel Rump / Ülzen 1587. In: Jahrbuch für Liturgik und Hymnologie 1 (1955), p. 47–62.
