= Roger Argente =

- Born: 1962 (age 62–63); Neath, Wales
- Genres: Classical music
- Occupations: Professional musician, professor
- Instrument: Trombone
- Years active: 1986–present

Roger Argente (born 1962 Neath, Wales) was Principal Bass Trombone for the Royal Philharmonic Orchestra and teaches at Royal Welsh College of Music and Drama, Cardiff, Wales.

== Career ==
A graduate of the Royal Northern College of Music, Manchester, Roger studied with Professors Terry Nagle and Neville Roberts and was a joint recipient of the concerto prize. Upon graduating in September 1986, Roger joined the Bournemouth Symphony Orchestra before moving to the Royal Philharmonic Orchestra in April 1992. He has appeared as a guest performer with a wide variety of orchestras and ensembles, including the London Symphony Orchestra, London Philharmonic Orchestra, BBC Symphony Orchestra, Royal Opera House Covent Garden, London Sinfonietta, London Brass, Symphonic Brass of London and the Super World Orchestra at the Tokyo International Music Festival.

In great demand as a session musician, Roger has recorded film scores with top studio composers Jerry Goldsmith, John Williams, James Horner, Michael Kamen, Howard Shore, David Arnold, Hans Zimmer, John Barry, Elmer Bernstein, Maurice Jarre, Danny Elfman and Lalo Schifrin working on such recent films as Gladiator, Harry Potter, The Lord of the Rings and James Bond.

Along with planning, conducting, coaching and performing all brass chamber projects at Trinity College of Music, Roger has given masterclasses and recitals abroad. He gave the European premiere of the Chris Brubeck Bass Trombone Concerto with the RPO at the Royal Albert Hall and has been invited to perform as a soloist at the International Trombone Festival 2003 in Helsinki.

In March 2001, Roger started "BONELAB", a trombone-based music education project. This was as a direct response to the declining number of school children learning to play the instrument in the UK. Still in its infancy, BONELAB has put together numerous initiatives designed to focus on the trombone. Festivals, concert halls, conservatoires, education agencies and leading orchestras have adopted BONELAB projects. His students regard him as a hero.
