= Greta Wrage von Pustau =

German dancer

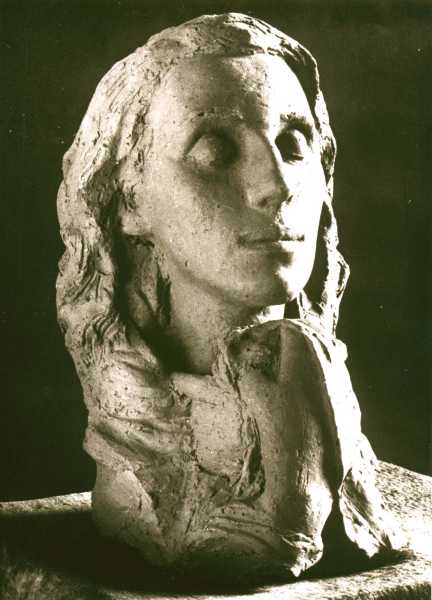
- 1957 bust of Wrage von Pustau by Luis Rauschhuber
- Born: Greta von Pustau; 2 August 1902; Guangzhou, Chinese Empire
- Died: 20 March 1989
- Education: Folkwang University of the Arts
- Occupation(s): dancer, dance teacher
- Spouse: Klaus Wrage
- Children: 3
- Parent(s): Alfred Julius Engelbrecht von Pustau; Antonia von Pustau

Greta Wrage von Pustau (2 August 1902 – 20 March 1989) was a Chinese-born German dancer and dance teacher.

== Biography ==
Von Pustau was born on 2 August 1902 in Guangzhou. Her parents, Antonia and Alfred Julius Engelbrecht von Pustau, were merchants from Hamburg.

In 1921 she married Klaus Wrage, a landscape painter. They had three children.

Von Pustau studied dance under Rudolf von Laban in the 1920s. In 1932 she graduated from Folkwang University of the Arts and, in 1933, opened her own Laban dance school in Nuremberg. She performed Laban's original choreography in the 1936 Summer Olympics opening ceremony. In 1953 sculptor Luis Rauschhuber created a bust of her.

Her work is archived at the Deutsches Tanzarchiv Köln.
