= First Lady of Ethiopia =

Wife of Ethiopian Prime Minister

- የኢትዮጵያ ቀዳማዊት እመቤት
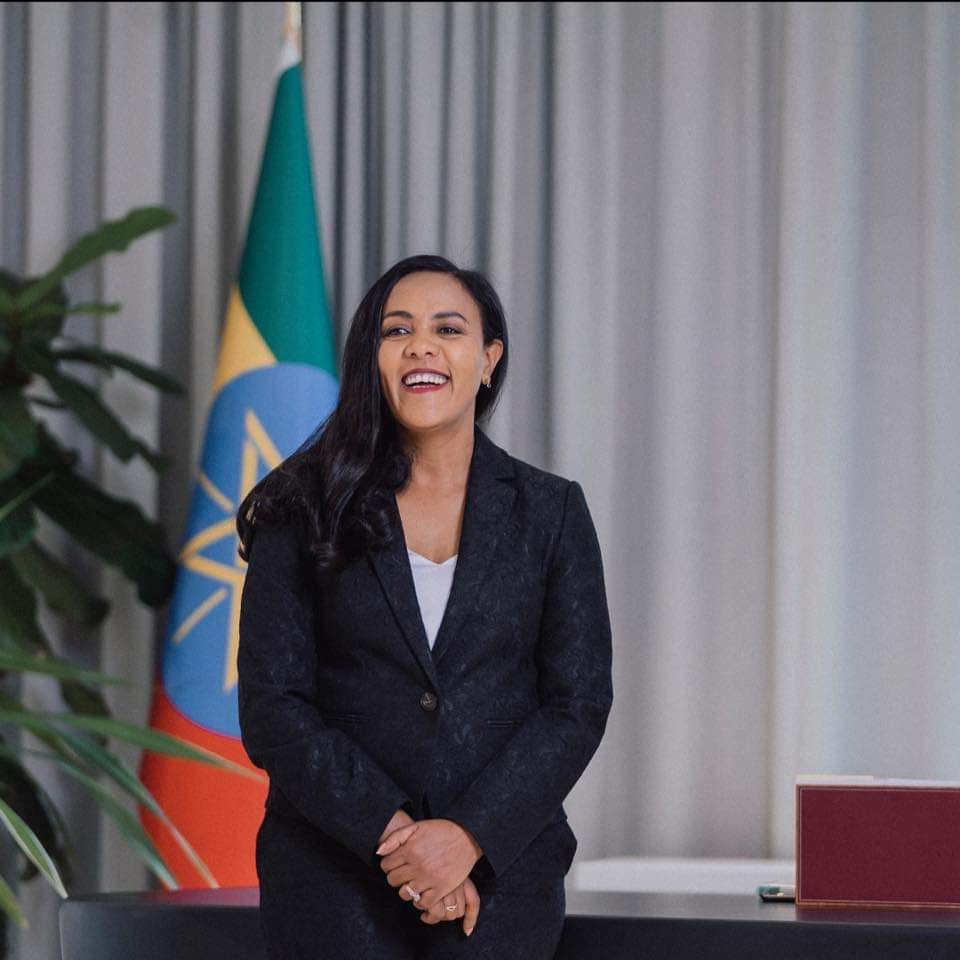
- Incumbent; Zinash Tayachew since 2 April 2018
- Style: Her Excellency
- Abbreviation: FLOE
- Residence: Office of First Lady
- Seat: Addis Ababa
- Formation: 22 August 1995 (31 years ago)
- Website: Office of First Lady

First Lady of Ethiopia (Amharic: የኢትዮጵያ ቀዳማዊት እመቤት, romanized: ye’ītyop’ya k’edamawīt imebēt) is a title for the wife of Federal Democratic Republic of Ethiopia Prime Minister. Officially the concept of First Lady applied in Ethiopian politics since 1995. Although the first lady's role has never been codified or officially defined, she figures prominently in the political and social life of the nation. However, the role of First Lady is created by her and contributes her unique position to improve women and children's capacity but her contribution has not been known at the broader public realm. The use of the title "First Lady" by the spouse of the prime minister is unusual compared to other parliamentary republics, where the title would be used by the spouse of the president; indeed, initially it was Regina Abelt, the wife of president Negasso Gidada, who was regarded as the first lady of Ethiopia, from the post's formation in 1995 to the election of Girma Wolde-Giorgis as president in 2001.

== History ==
In Ethiopian history, the word ‘Majesty’ was the symbol of royal title that has been referred to a king or Queen. The wife of royal family could share a power with her royal title of ‘Queen’ which has created alliances among the other side. It means, the name of ‘Queen’ had recognized by societies and entitled with a power for the wife of a king, then she had a supreme power to advise her husband to sustain and keep a monarchal system from generation to generation (by appoint her son to be a king) such as Queen Eleni, Seble wengel, Mintewab, Empress Taytu. They were contributed their special position to their country as well as the state of subjects. They have passed their legacy to the advancement of Ethiopian women. People has followed them as their leaders equivalent to their king (Tayitu is the best example).

After the annihilated of Monarchal system and substituted by military system (socialism ideology), the wife of Ethiopian leader had not any title for the couple of decades. But after the Transitional government of Ethiopia succeeded, the concept of first lady come alive when the wife of President Negasso Gidida Regina Abelt, citizen of Germany, officially became the First Lady of Federal Democratic Republic of Ethiopia in 1995. Uniquely, Regina Abelt was the only person in Ethiopia history to be nominated for a first ladyship regardless of her citizenship and nomination by the behalf of president.

In 2013, Federal Democratic Republic of Ethiopia the Office of the First Lady has established during the reign of the former First Lady Roman Tesfaye. All programs that undertaking by of the office has its significant to the Ethiopian women's empowerment and address the national gender issues.

== List of first ladies ==
List of Ethiopian first ladies, and prime ministers and presidents by the time of their first ladyship
Number	Name	Nationality	Wife of	In office from	To	Name of Prime Minister	Name of President
1	Regina Abelt	Germany	Negasso Gidada	22 August 1995	8 October 2001	Meles Zenawi	Negasso Gidada
2	Azeb Mesfin	Ethiopia	Meles Zenawi	8 October 2001	20 August 2012	Meles Zenawi	Girma Wolde-Giorgis
3	Roman Tesfaye	Ethiopia	Hailemariam Desalegn	20 August 2012	2 April 2018	Hailemariam Desalegn	Mulatu Teshome
4	Zinash Tayachew	Ethiopia	Abiy Ahmed	2 April 2018	Now	Abiy Ahmed	Sahle-Work Zewde
