= Evangelisches Kirchengesangbuch =

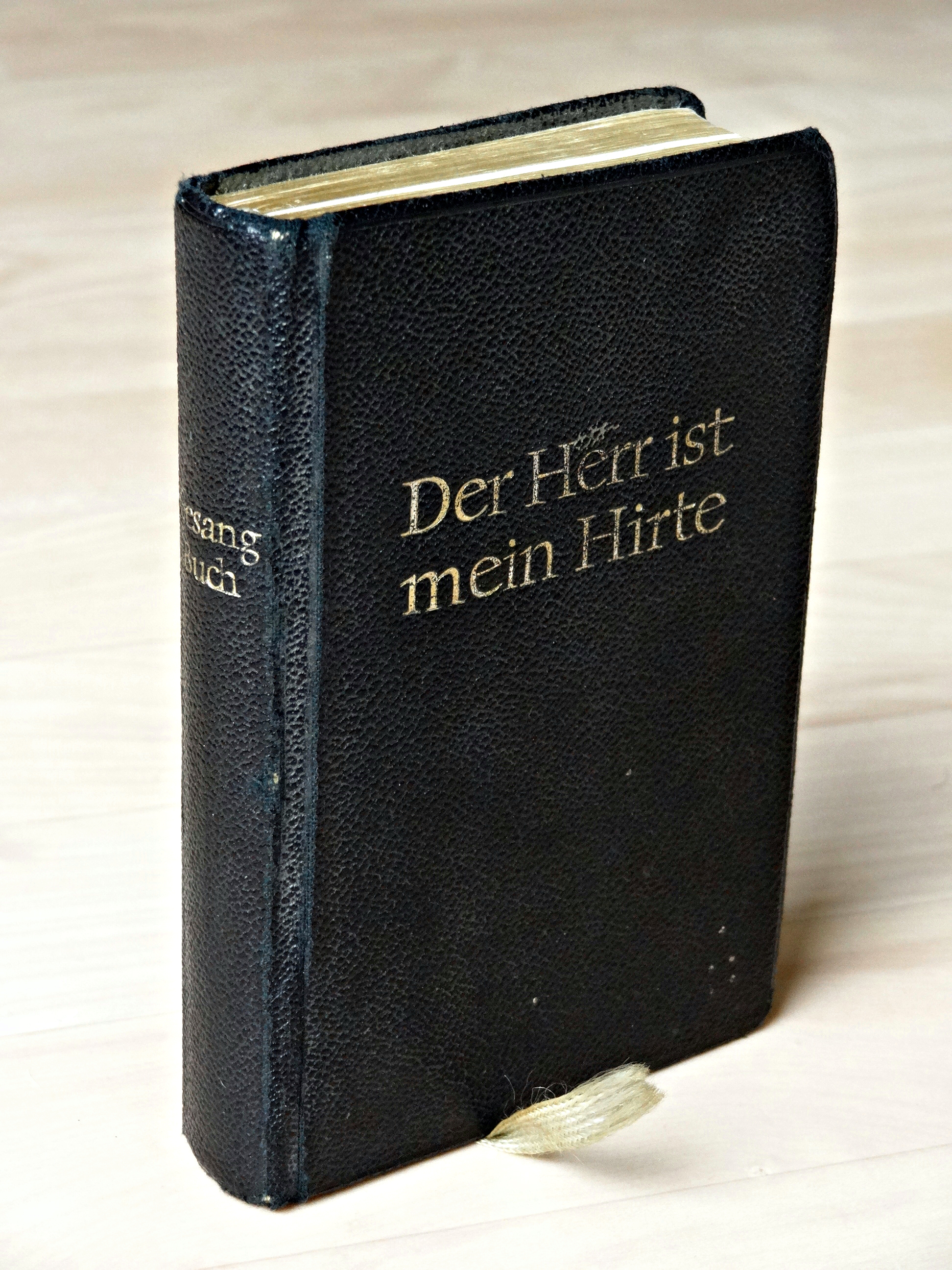
Der Herr ist mein Hirte, Evangelisches Kirchengesangbuch for the Protestant Church in Hesse and Nassau, 1962

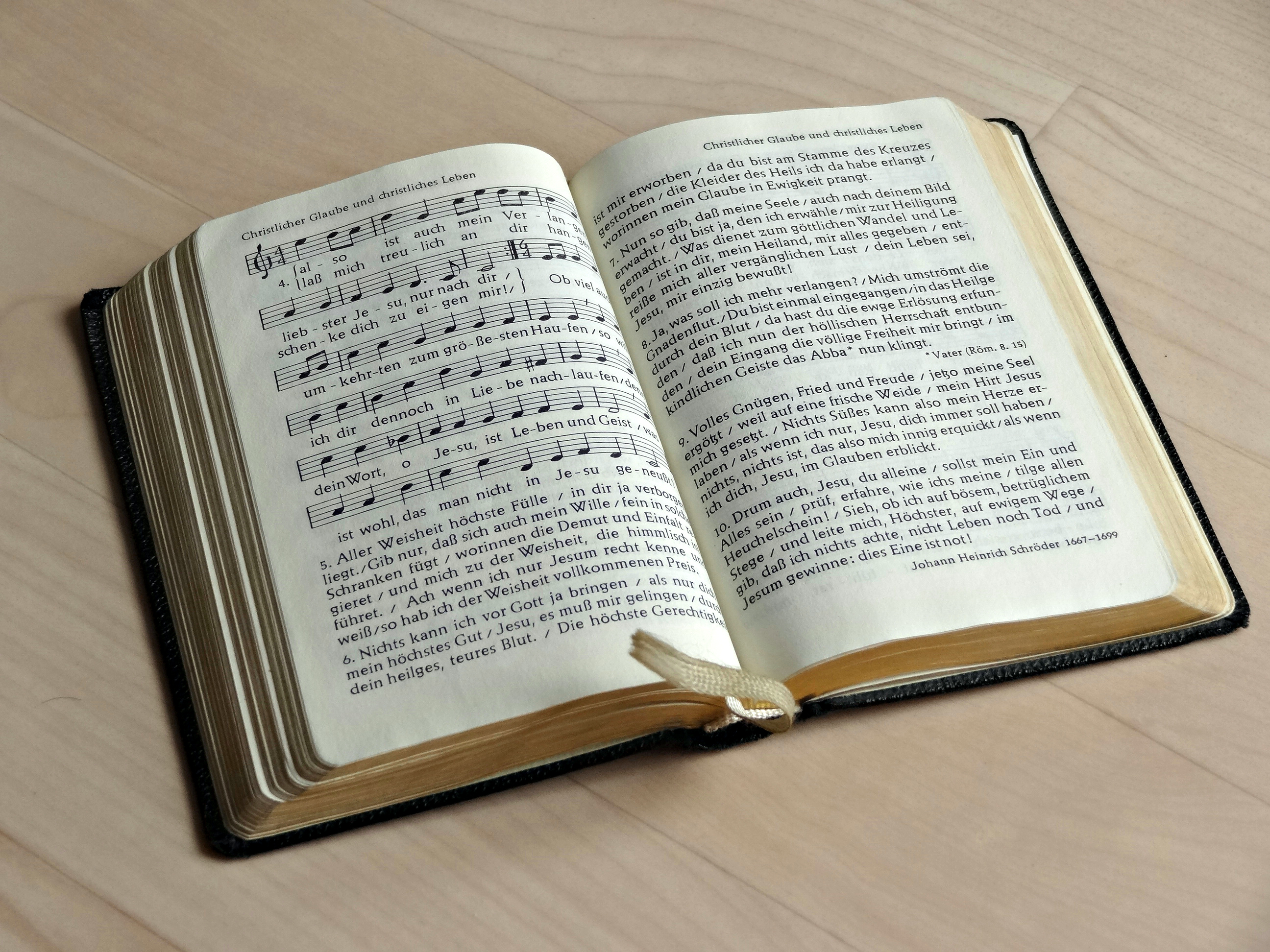
EKG 259, "Eins ist Not! Ach Herr, dies eine", 1962

The Evangelisches Kirchengesangbuch (EKG, literally: Protestant church songbook) was the first common hymnal of German-speaking churches in the Protestant state churches (Landeskirchen) in Germany and the Protestant churches in Austria. It was introduced between 1950 and 1969. The EKG was replaced by the current Evangelisches Gesangbuch (EG) between 1993 and 1996.

== History ==
The intention to have a common German Protestant hymnal date back to the mid of the 19th century. A meeting of representatives of German state churches in Eisenach in 1853 resulted in a collection of songs that were widely known and preferred, Deutsches Evangelisches Kirchen-Gesangbuch in 150 Kernliedern, also known as Eisenacher Büchlein. The EKG appeared in 1950, with 394 common songs. Each state church added its special hymns.

The current Evangelisches Gesangbuch replaced the EKG between 1993 and 1996, depending on the region.

== Literature ==
- Christhard Mahrenholz, Oskar Söhngen (eds.): Handbuch zum Evangelischen Kirchengesangbuch. Vandenhoeck & Ruprecht, Göttingen 1953 ff.
