= Uwe Köller =

German trumpeter (born 1964)

Uwe Köller (born 1964 in Neuss, West Germany) is a German trumpeter. His career began as a solo trumpeter in the Berlin Symphony Orchestra; after 1991 he was at the Deutsche Oper Berlin. Beginning in 1995, he has been a permanent member of the group "German Brass". Beginning in 1997, Köller taught as a visiting professor to the University of Music and Dramatic Arts in Graz. In 1999, he then left the German Opera Berlin to become a professor of trumpet at Graz.
