= Negasso Gidada =

President of Ethiopia from 1995 to 2001

- ነጋሶ ጊዳዳ
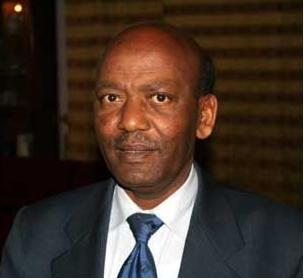

President of Ethiopia
- In office 22 August 1995 – 8 October 2001
- Prime Minister: Meles Zenawi
- Preceded by: Meles Zenawi (Acting)
- Succeeded by: Girma Wolde-Giorgis

Minister of Labor and Social Affairs
- In office 1990–1991

Minister of Communication
- In office 1992–2019

Member of 1994 Ethiopian Constituent Assembly election
- 1995 Constitution of Ethiopia (Acting)
- In office 5 June 1994 – December 1994

Advisory of Kunuz College
- In office 2002–2019

Member of the House of Peoples' Representatives for Dembidolo
- In office 2005–2008

Founding Member of Medrek
- In office July 2008 – 27 April 2019

Member, Deputy Chairperson and Head of Foreign Affairs of the Unity for Democracy and Justice
- In office 15 December 2009 – 27 April 2019

Personal details
- Born: Negasso Gidada Solon; 8 September 1943 Dembidolo, Illubabor Province, Ethiopian Empire (now Oromia Region, Ethiopia)
- Died: 27 April 2019 (aged 75) Frankfurt, Germany
- Resting place: Petros Paulos Evangelic Church, Ethiopia; 9.055757°N 38.71399°E
- Party: EPRDF (until 22 June 2001); Independent (2005–2008); Unity for Democracy and Justice under Coalition of Medrek (2009–2019)
- Spouse: Regina Abelt (m. 1985)
- Children: Ibsa Negasso; Telile Negasso

Negasso Gidada Solon (Ge'ez: ነጋሶ ጊዳዳ; 8 September 1943 – 27 April 2019) was an Ethiopian politician who was the president of Ethiopia from 1995 until 2001.

== Biography ==
Negasso was the son of Gidada Solon, one of the first local ministers of a Protestant church in the Dembidolo area in western Ethiopia.

Negasso held a doctorate in social history from the Goethe University Frankfurt and was a part-time lecturer of history at Addis Ababa University. The title of his doctoral thesis was "History of the Sayyoo Oromo of Southwestern Wallaga, Ethiopia, from about 1730 to 1886". He was married to Regina Abelt, a German nurse and midwife. Being the First Lady of Ethiopia while holding the German Citizenship earned Abelt considerable, yet unwanted, attention by the German and European tabloid press. In marked contrast, Regina Abelt was virtually invisible in Ethiopia and never enjoyed the official title of First Lady which was instead used by the wife of the Prime Minister.

Negasso died in Germany on 27 April 2019, after battling health issues.

== Political career ==
In Europe, he was an active member of the Oromo Liberation Front (OLF). Negasso had been Minister of Information in the Transitional Government of Ethiopia and Central Committee member of the Oromo People's Democratic Organisation (OPDO) when he became president on 22 August 1995. He left office when his term expired on 8 October 2001. Before the end of his term, he was expelled from both the OPDO and the EPRDF coalition on 22 June.

In the 2005 general elections, Negasso was elected to the Ethiopian House of Peoples' Representatives as an independent from Dembidolo in the Mirab Welega Zone of the Oromia Region.

In July 2008, Negasso became a founding member of the Forum for Democratic Dialogue (FDD), a new coalition of opposition parties and activists. Then in November 2009, he announced he had joined the Unity for Democracy and Justice Party (UDJ), one of the eight parties in the FDD, "to try to unite Ethiopia". At the time of his announcement, he also asked forgiveness from Ethiopians for deceiving them that Ethiopia's current constitution was ratified in 1995 with full participation of all political parties in a democratic manner. "There were a number of political parties that were excluded from the process," he said during the ceremony when he and Siye Abraha were officially inducted into the UDJ.

Political offices
Preceded by Meles Zenawi	President of Ethiopia; 1995–2001	Succeeded by Girma Wolde-Giorgis
