= Red Terror (Ethiopia) =

Political repression campaign by the Derg (1976–1978)

Red Terror Qey Shibir
- Part of the Ethiopian Civil War
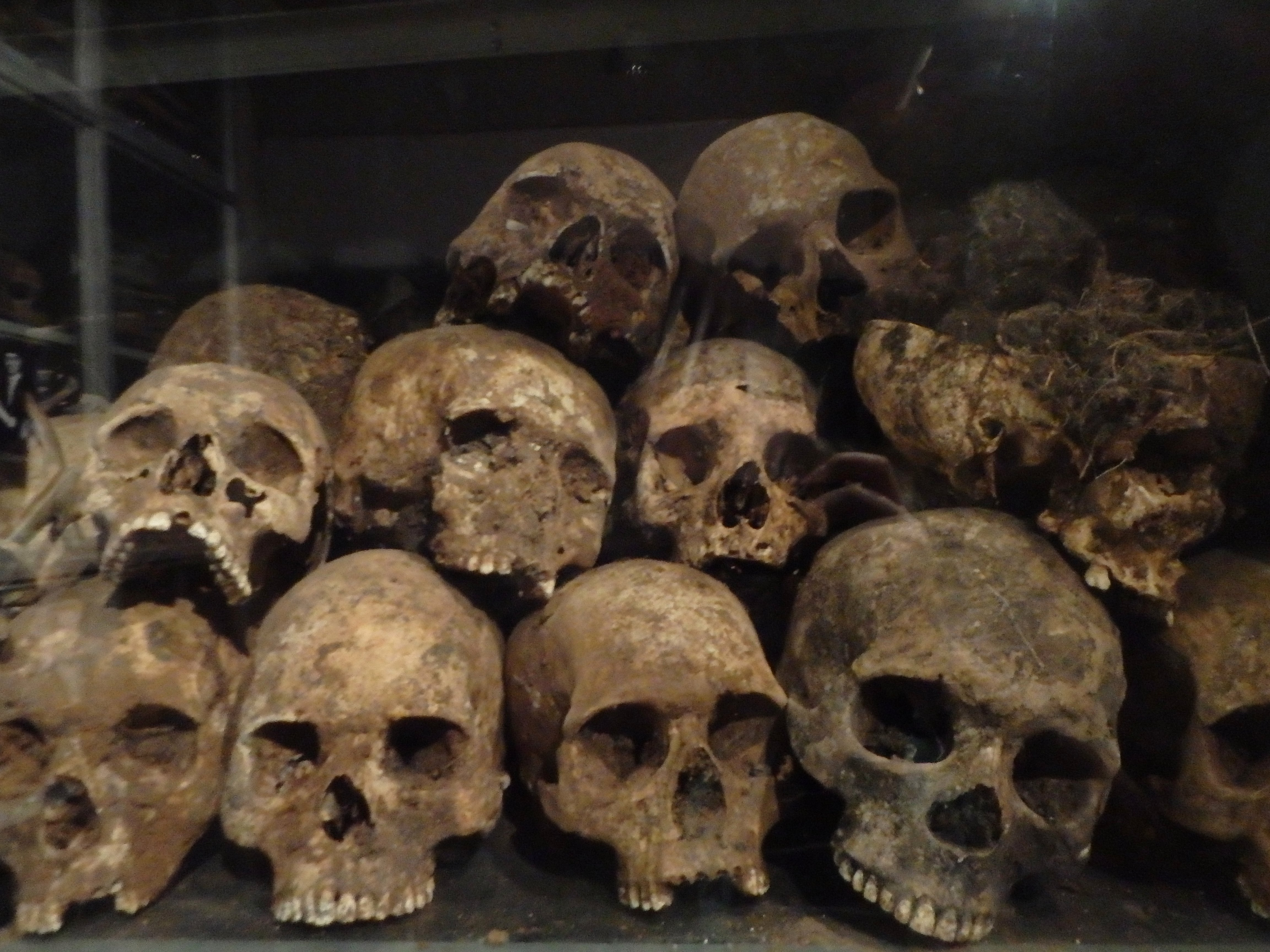
- Skull remains at "Red Terror" Martyrs' Memorial Museum in Addis Ababa
- Native name: ቀይ ሽብር
- Date: 23 September 1976 – 22 March 1978
- Location: Ethiopia
- Type: Summary execution, systematic purge, mass murder, politicide, considered a genocide by the Ethiopian Federal Court
- Cause: Assassination attempt of Mengistu Haile Mariam; Anti-government movement of rival political groups, primarily the Ethiopian People's Revolutionary Party and All-Ethiopia Socialist Movement
- Motive: Consolidation of Derg control over Ethiopia
- Deaths: 10,000–980,000
- Trial: See Trials of the Derg members

The Ethiopian Red Terror, also known as the Qey Shibir (Amharic: ቀይ ሽብር, romanized: ḳäy shəbbər), was a violent political repression campaign of the Derg against other competing Marxist-Leninist groups in Ethiopia and present-day Eritrea from 1976 to 1978. This wave of repression followed Ethiopian People’s Revolutionary Party's guerrilla assassination campaign, which targeted and killed fifty Derg officials and Derg supporters. The Qey Shibir was an attempt to consolidate Derg rule during the political instability after their overthrow of Emperor Haile Selassie in 1974 and the subsequent Ethiopian Civil War. The Qey Shibir was based on the Red Terror of the Russian Civil War, and most visibly took place after Mengistu Haile Mariam became chairman of the Derg on 3 February 1977. It is estimated that 10,000 to 980,000 people were killed over the course of the Qey Shibir.

In 2006, Mengistu was convicted of genocide in absentia by Ethiopia for his role in the Qey Shibir while leader of the Derg.

== History ==
=== Background ===
Following the deposition of Emperor Haile Selassie on 12 September 1974, the Derg was faced with a number of civilian groups competing for control of Ethiopia, most notably the Ethiopian People's Revolutionary Party (EPRP). In September 1976, EPRP militants were arrested and executed, at the same time as the EPRP carried out an assassination campaign against ideologues and supporters of the Derg. This activity is known as White Terror. Although an unsuccessful attempt to kill Mengistu on 23 September was attributed to the EPRP, the first prominent victim of the EPRP's terroristic or insurgency activity was Dr. Feqre Mar'ed, a member of the Political Bureau and All-Ethiopia Socialist Movement (MEISON), a rival revolutionary party.

However, the Derg was split between then-temporary chair Colonel Mengistu and a faction allied against him, which limited his control. This rivalry was resolved at the meeting of the Standing Committee of the Derg on 3 February 1977, at which fifty-eight top Derg officers were killed in an hour-long shootout. Seven of these officers were opponents of Mengistu, including chairman and Lieutenant General Tafari Benti, Captain Almayahu Haile, Captain Mogas Wolde Mikael, and Lt. Colonel Asrat Desta, the latter being an avowed Marxist-Leninist. Mengistu said "We are doing what Lenin did. You cannot build socialism without Red Terror." Two rivals to Mengistu were still alive: Colonel Berhanu Bayeh and Lt. Colonel Atnafu Abate. Col. Berhanu had sided with Mengistu, and Lt. Colonel Atnafu quickly sided with the victor of the bloodbath, leaving Mengistu as the undisputed head of the Derg, and ruler of Ethiopia. A few days later, Mengistu turned his attention to his rivals outside of the Derg, foremost being the EPRP.

=== Attacks on the EPRP ===
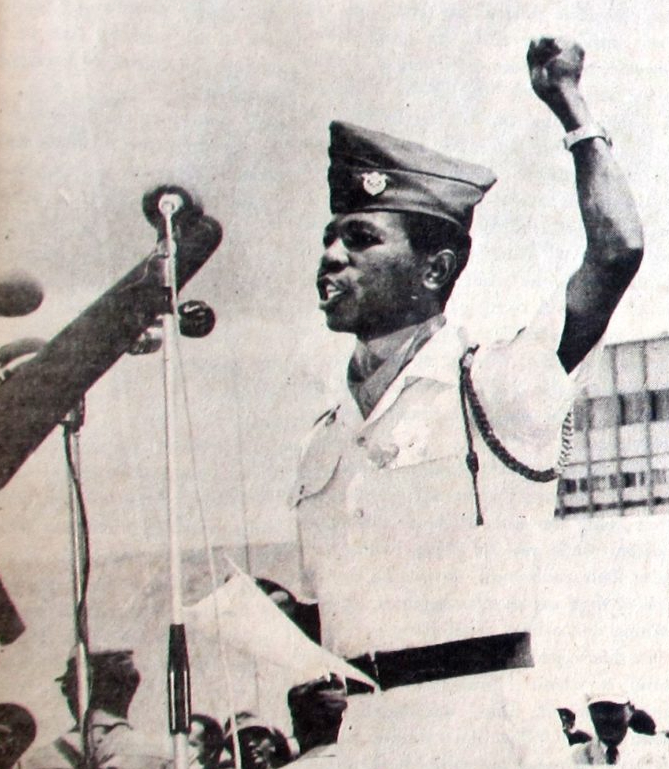
Mengistu's anti-EPRP speech.

Mengistu officially began his campaign with a speech in Revolution Square (formerly and currently Meskel Square) in the heart of Addis Ababa, which included the words "Death to counterrevolutionaries! Death to the EPRP!". When he delivered these words, he produced three bottles of what appeared to be blood and smashed them to the ground to show what the revolution would do to its enemies. This campaign involved organized groups of civilians, or kebeles, which within a month's time began to receive arms from the Derg. "Contrary to expectations," note researcher Marina Ottaway and then Washington Post correspondent David Ottaway in their account, "these squads did not all side with the Derg or heed its call to track down 'reactionaries' and 'anarchists'. Rather, many followed their own whim and law, in accordance to the political faction that controlled each kebele or factory. Not only had numerous defense squads been infiltrated by the EPRP, but also those controlled by the Political Bureau were often bent on furthering the interests of MEISON rather than the Derg."

The Ottaways date the height of the Red Terror in Addis Ababa to a search that began on 22 March 1977, when the Derg felt that they had armed enough civilian groups to permit a house-by-house search for EPRP members, arms, and other paraphernalia. However, the search was anything but systematic, the Ottways note, with "each squad a law unto itself. Some looked only for arms, but others confiscated food supplies, building materials, and gasoline; some considered cameras espionage equipment and others regarded typewriters as highly dangerous." Despite many being taken from their homes in the middle of the night, some never to return home, few of the top leaders of the EPRP were among the dead.

A number of distinctly ugly incidents followed. One was at the Berhanena Selam Printing Press, where three days later a dozen workers were arrested for being EPRP members, then afterwards released for lack of evidence; on the morning of 26 March, nine of them were found murdered, including a woman in an advanced stage of pregnancy, which shocked the city. The deaths were found to be the responsibility of a certain Girma Kebede, who was later found to be "the Political Bureau's chief executioner; he had already murdered twenty-four persons and had a list of over two hundred others he was supposed to liquidate." Embarrassed, the Derg had him and five associates executed as counterrevolutionaries on 2 April.

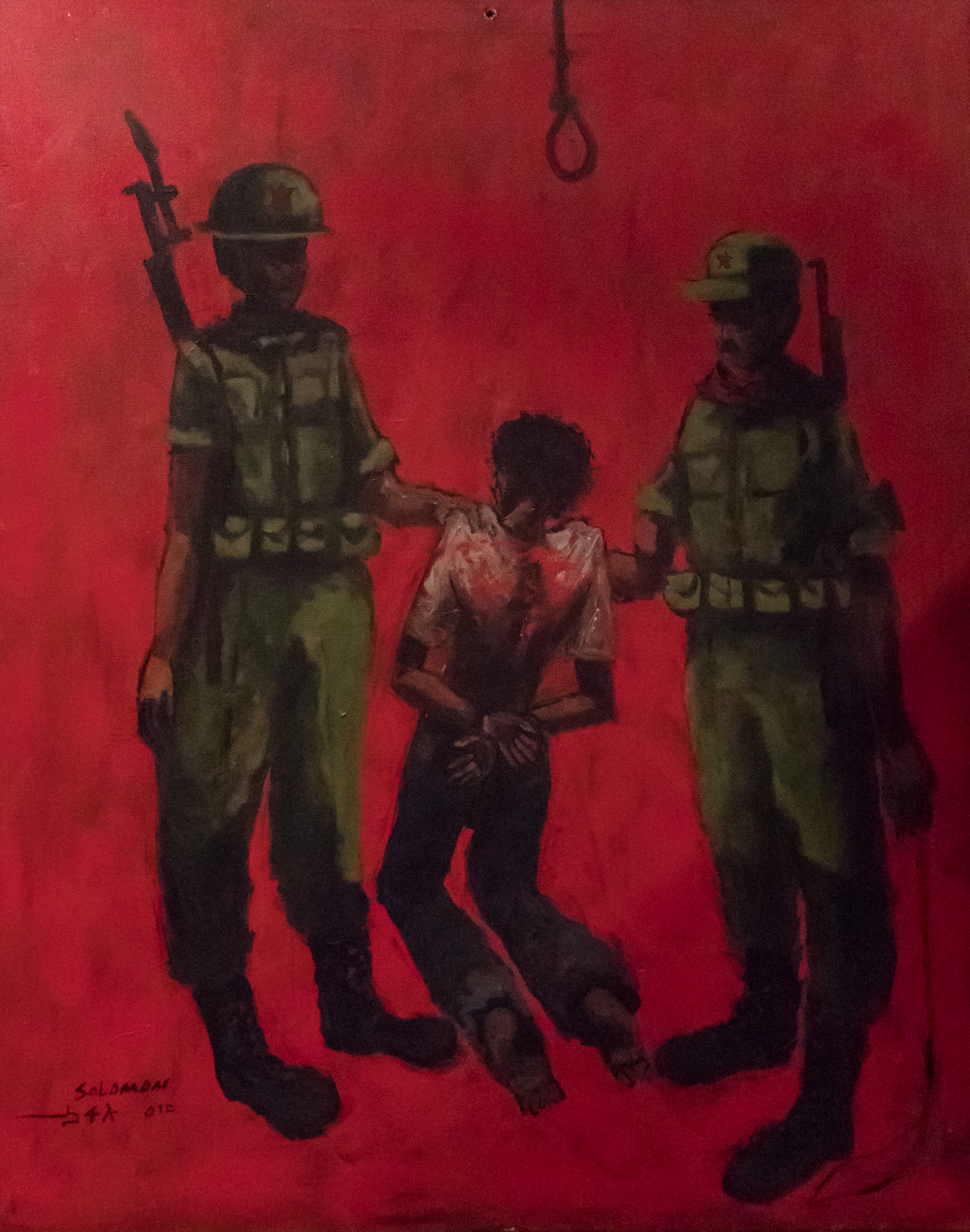
Piece of sketch showing civilian torture by Derg police officers

Despite this brutality, the EPRP continued to strike back, best as it could. As one contemporary report describes:

In and around the capital, the main opposition group is the Ethiopian People's Revolutionary Party (E.P.R.P.) [...] E.P.R.P. has given the Dergue good reason to be nervous: it has assassinated more than 20 government officials, mounted at least one daring raid on Dergue headquarters, and even wounded Mengistu in an ambush. One rebel sympathizer accosted Correspondent Griggs on a busy downtown street and boasted: "We have 700 marksmen, and some of them are Mengistu's own soldiers. It will take time, but we will clean out the pseudo-Marxist military leaders eventually."

Events like this led to tension between the Derg junta (and presumably Mengistu) and the civilian Political Bureau. Concern over the threat of the EPRP kept this tension from becoming a definite break until the eve of May Day, when the Political Bureau, on the pretext that an anti-government protest was in the offing, ordered the kebeles to arrest any young person suspected of being an EPRP member. According to the Ottaways, "Hundreds were arrested, taken to three different sites on the outskirts of Addis Ababa, and executed en masse. Scores of others were gunned down in the streets by the Derg's 'permanent secretaries', the jeeps mounted with machine guns constantly patrolling the streets of Addis Ababa. The death toll may have been as high as one thousand." Afterwards, the Derg disavowed this outrage and put the blame for the slaughter on the Political Bureau in a proclamation on 14 July. The Bureau's leader Haile Fida and a group of his followers attempted to flee the capital the following August, but were caught.

At the same time, the Red Terror made MEISON its next target. "Sensing danger," writes Bahru Zewde, "the leaders of the organization hastily tried to go underground. But almost all of them were either captured or killed in August 1977 as they tried to retreat into the countryside in several detachments."

Thousands of men and women were rounded up and executed in the following two years. Amnesty International estimates that the death toll could be as high as 500,000. Groups of people were herded into churches that were then burned down, and women were subjected to systematic rape by soldiers. The Save the Children Fund reported that the victims of the Red Terror included not only adults but 1,000 or more children, mostly aged between eleven and thirteen, whose corpses were left in the streets of Addis Ababa.

== Aftermath ==
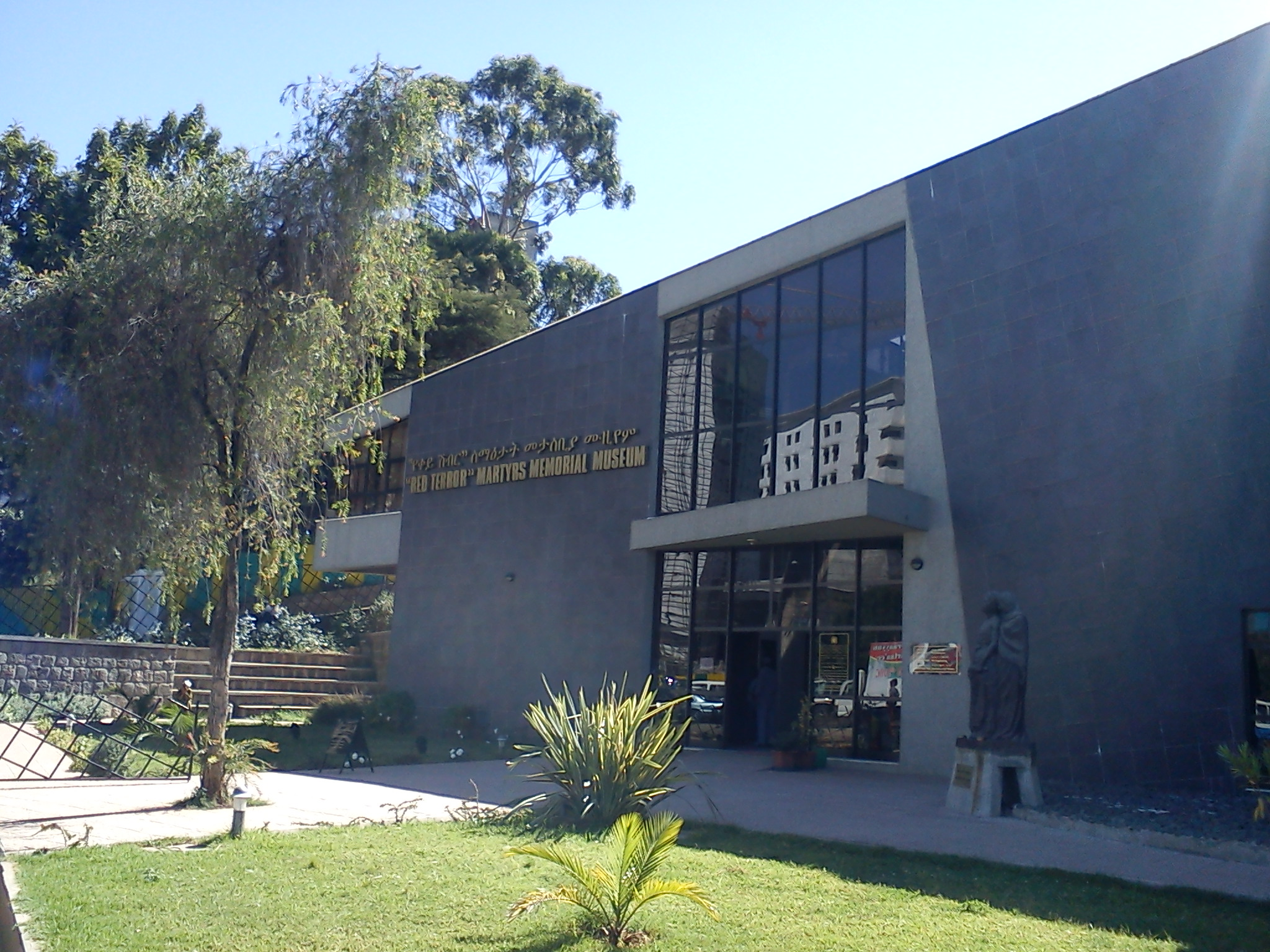
"Red Terror" Martyrs' Memorial Museum in Addis Ababa

The victims' lives are immortalized in the "Red Terror" Martyrs' Memorial Museum in Addis Ababa.

Mengistu was found guilty of genocide in absentia and was sentenced to life in prison in January 2007. After his conviction, Zimbabwe, where he received sanctuary due to friendship with Robert Mugabe, said it would not extradite him. On 26 May 2008, the Ethiopian Supreme Court sentenced Mengistu in absentia to death. Eighteen associates of Mengistu, 16 of whom are in Ethiopian prisons, also are under a death sentence. Two senior regime officials lived in the Italian embassy in Addis Ababa from 2008 until their death sentences were commuted and they were granted parole in 2020. Another individual who was found guilty in absentia in May 2002, Kelbessa Negewo, was returned from his exile in the United States several years later to serve a life sentence.

In November 2022, two weeks after the final ceasefire of the Tigray war, documentarian Ruth Hunduma interviewed her mother, Tsehay Ayele, a survivor of the Red Terror. The resulting film was then released in 2023 under the title of The Medallion, named after the ornament Ayele received as a parting gift from her Egyptian employer, whom she worked for while taking refuge during the Red Terror and who instructed her to sell it in case of an emergency. The Medallion was later released online by The New Yorker.

== See also ==
- Ethiopian Civil War
- Hutu Ten Commandments
- March of the Iron Will
- Mass killings under communist regimes
- Crimes against humanity under communist regimes
- Neo-Stalinism
- Stalinism
