= History of the Red Terror (Ethiopia) =

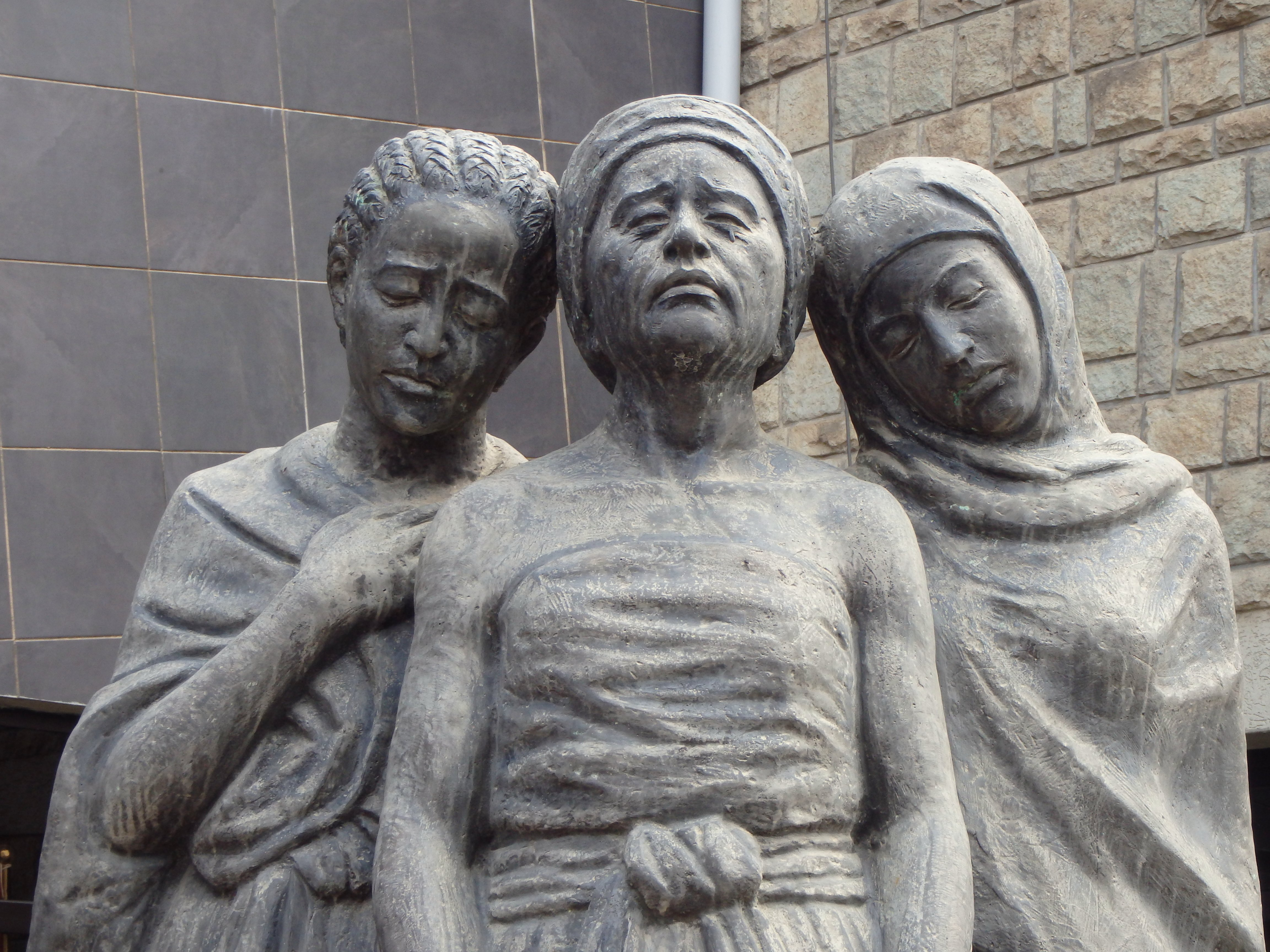
Women statue in front of the "Red Terror" Martyrs' Memorial Museum in Addis Ababa, Ethiopia.

The History of the Red Terror refers to the political repression launched by the Derg military junta in Ethiopia from 1976 to 1978, resulting in the deaths of more than 10,000 people. The government officially uses the term "Red Terror" to refer to these events. During the 1960s and early 1970s, the Haile Selassie government faced heavy criticism, particularly from the educated class, including university students who supported left-wing ideologies. While most detentions and executions took place in Addis Ababa, there were also numerous massacres across the country, particularly in 1978. Cities such as Asmara, Gondar, Bahir Dar, and Jimma suffered heavily during this period.
