= Mogus =

Mogus may refer to:

== People ==
- Leo Mogus (1921–1971), American basketball player
- Mogus Wolde Mikael (d. 1977), Eritrean military officer
- Milan Moguš (1927–2017), Croatian linguist and academician
