= Meskel Square =

Public square in Addis Ababa, Ethiopia

Coordinates: 9°0′37″N 38°45′40″E

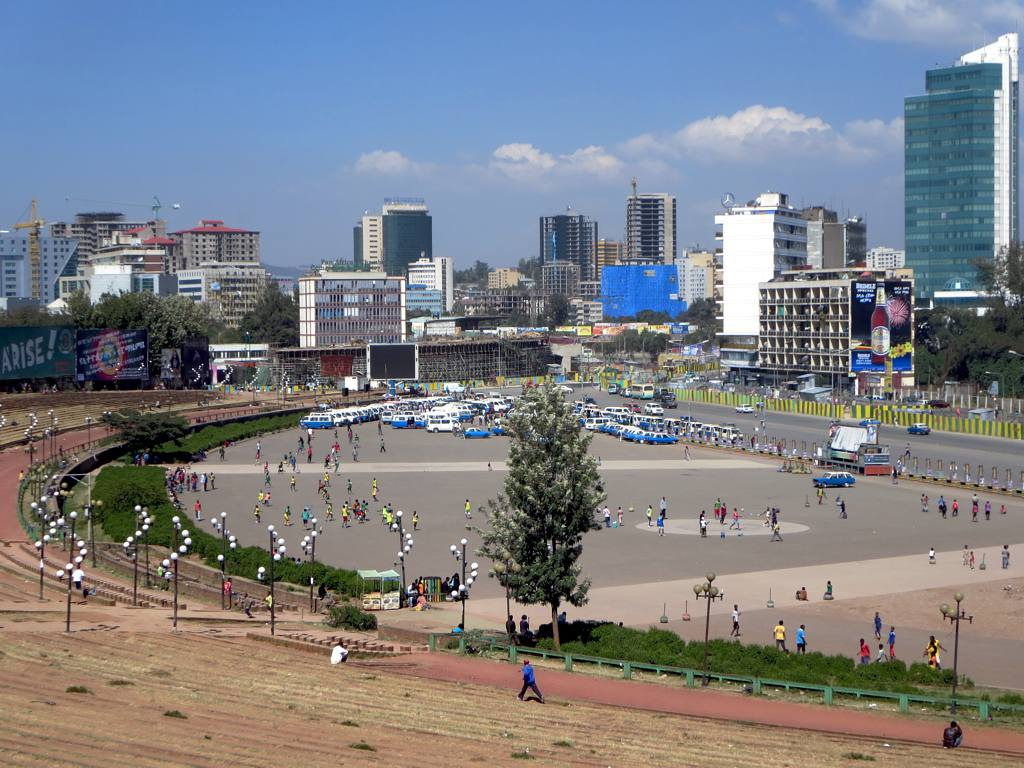
View from Meskel Square

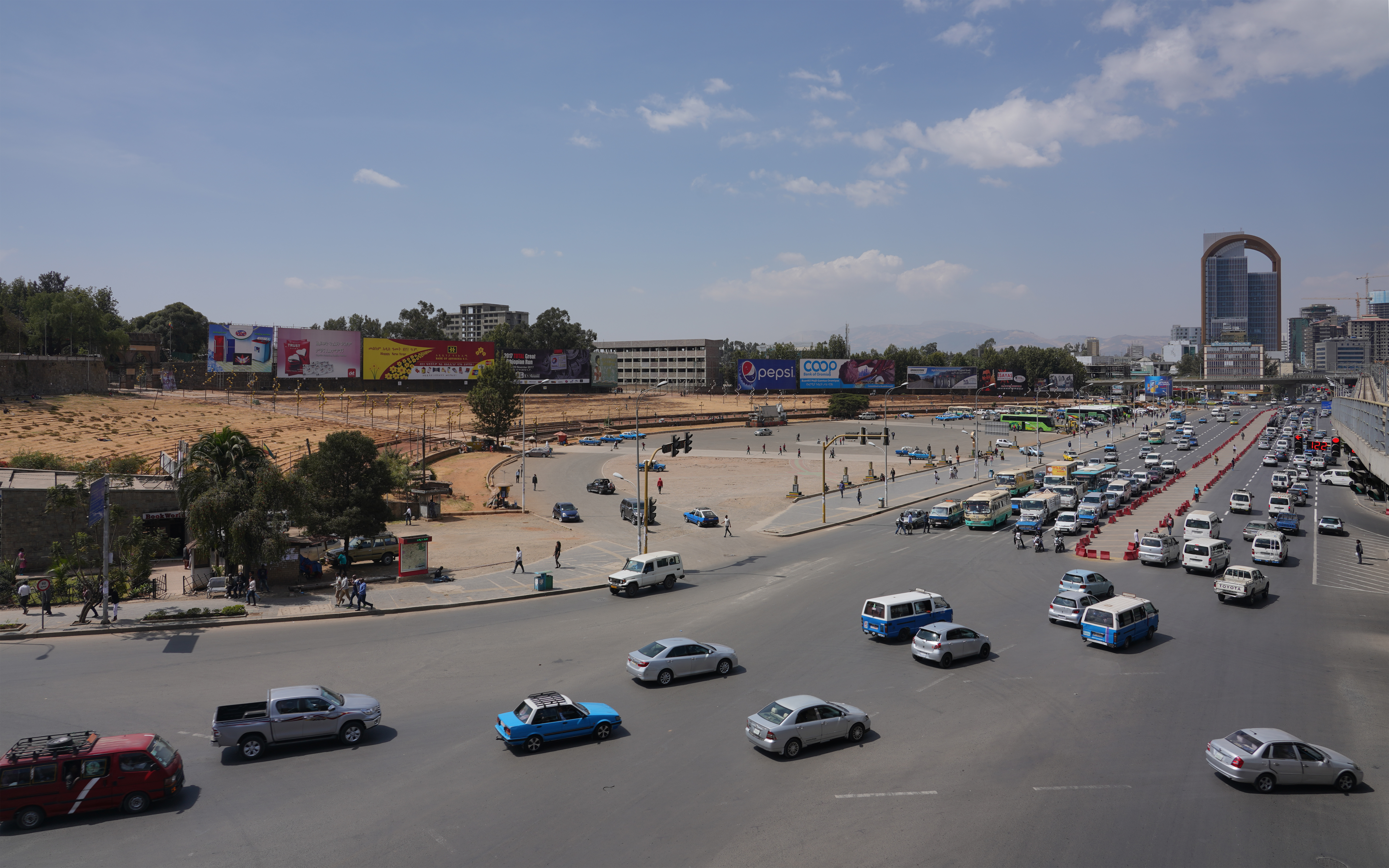
Traffic in Meskel Square

Meskel Square (Amharic: መስቀል አደባባይ, romanized: mesik’el ādebabay, lit. 'Cross Square') is a public square in the city of Addis Ababa, Ethiopia. It is often a site for Ethiopian Orthodox Tewahedo Church gatherings or for demonstrations and festivals, notably, the Meskel Festival from which it takes its name.

== History ==
Emperor Haile Selassie I seen celebrating the finding of the cross at Meskel Square in 1971.

Previously it was known as Estifanos (Stephen) Square before its name was changed to Meskel Square in the early 1950s. Traditionally, the Meskel holiday (commemorating the finding of the true cross) bonfire in Addis Ababa was lit by the Emperor of Ethiopia accompanied by members of the Imperial Family, the nobility, and high officials of the Orthodox Church and the government. The bonfire was initially lit in a square near the southern gate of St George's Cathedral during the reigns of Emperor Menelik II and Empress Zewditu, but was moved to its present location in the specifically constructed Meskel Square by Emperor Haile Selassie.

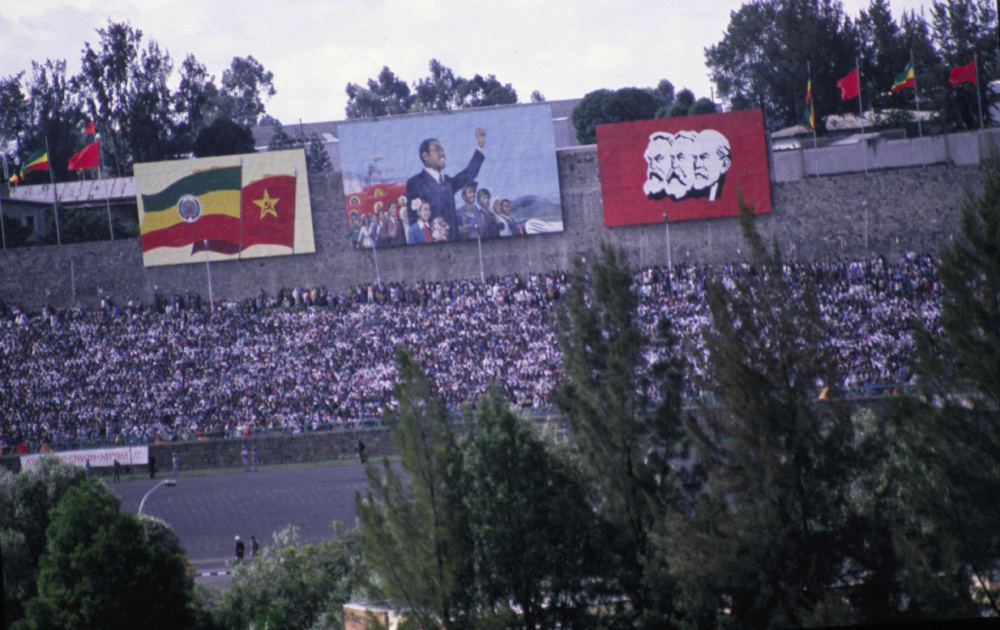
Government-organized political rally at Meskel Square, then called Revolution Square, during the late 1980s

Following the fall of the monarchy in 1974, Meskel Square was renamed Revolution Square (Abiyot Adebabay). It was greatly expanded so that it could accommodate the annual Revolution Day and May Day parades on 12 September and 1 May. Three gigantic portraits of Karl Marx, Friedrich Engels and Vladimir Lenin were erected in the square. The population of Addis Ababa would joke that these were the "new trinity". Meskel festival bonfires continued to be lit there for the time being, with the Patriarch of the Ethiopian Orthodox Tewahedo Church lighting the bonfire in place of the emperor. However, in 1988, the officially atheist government ordered the Meskel celebration to be moved out of Meskel Square and it began to be held back at the small square outside the southern gates of St. George Cathedral.

After Mengistu Haile Mariam fled Ethiopia in May 1991, the short-lived government of General Tesfaye Gebre Kidan restored the original name of Meskel Square, and the Ethiopian People's Revolutionary Democratic Front government returned the Meskel celebration to the square.

Nowadays the square is often used for large secular purposes as well. Concerts, parades, car races, and various other government and public events are held there. Political parties often hold rallies in the square. Part of the public ceremonies surrounding the re-burial of Emperor Haile Selassie in 2000 took place in the square as well. The national monument in memory of those massacred by the Dergue regime in the Red Terror of the 1970s has been built at the eastern entrance to the square, and the remains of many victims from that period have been buried there. The Red Terror Martyrs Memorial Museum was open in February 2010

On 6 August 2016, hundreds of protesters marched on Meskel Square during the 2016 Ethiopian protests and shouted "we want our freedom" and "free our political prisoners."

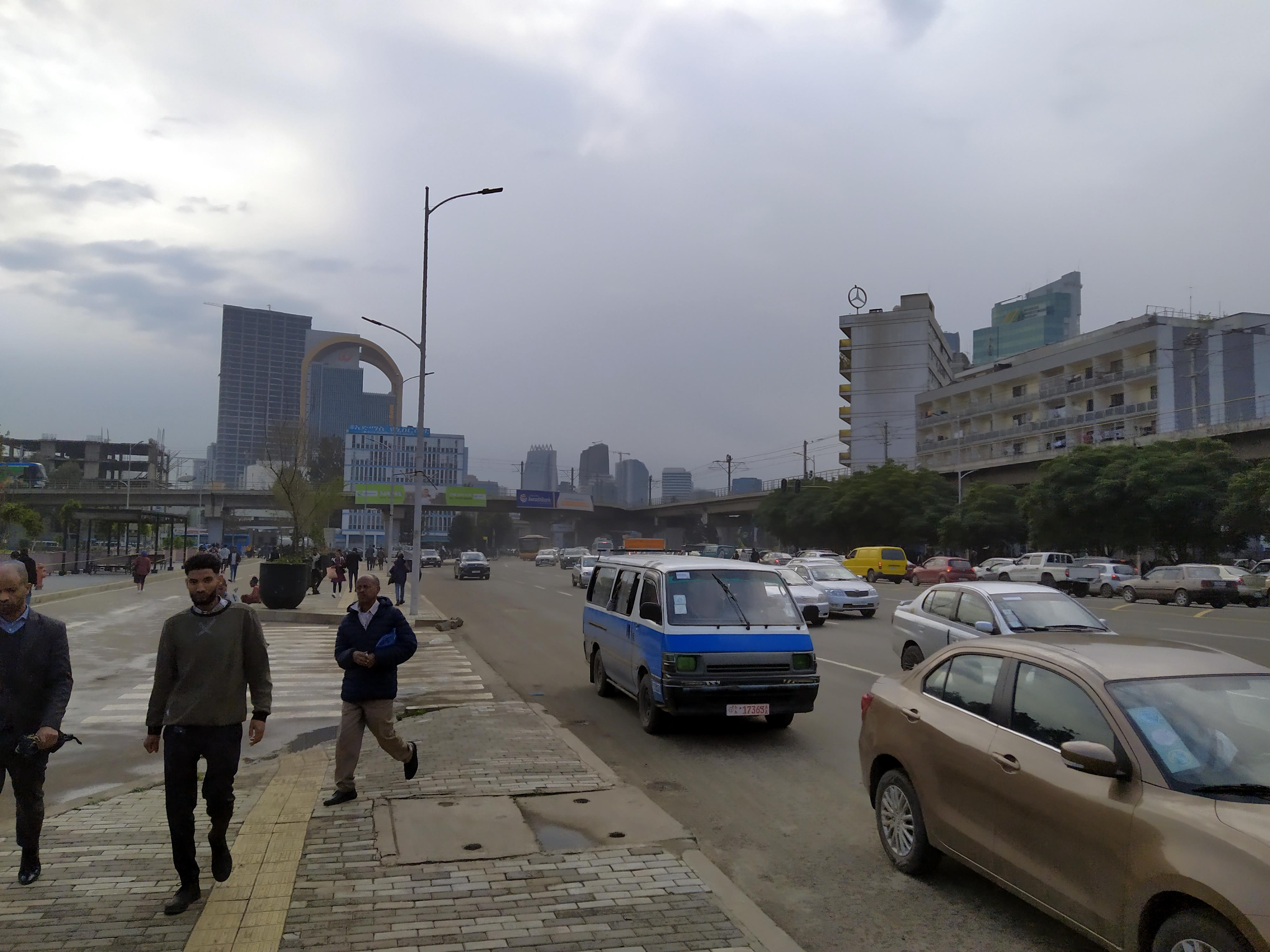
Meskel Square in 2023

Addis Ababa city municipality announced in mid-2020 a plan to upgrade Meskel Square. At the beginning of The Mesqel Square Municipality Rehabilitation project it piqued the interest of many including Ethiopian Orthodox Tewahedo Church citing concern in terms of it affecting the overall religious value of the place. and The Association of Ethiopian Architects (AEA) for transparency. The Association released a statement on behalf of its executive committee on 6 May 2020, dubbing it a missed opportunity for harvesting creative ideas through the solicitation of multiple design solutions. The Meskel Square Project consists of 1,400 underground parking spaces, 6 LED signboards, and 24 retail facilities. The project was completed in June 2021.

== Meskel festival ==
The Meskel Festival has been celebrated for over 1,600 years. The word "Meskel" means "cross" and the festival is the Ethiopian Orthodox Church's equivalent of Feast of the Cross. It commemorates the moment when the crucifix was revealed to Empress Helena of Constantinople, mother of Constantine the Great.

Thousands gather at Meskel Square annually on 17 Meskerem in the Ethiopian calendar (27 September in the Gregorian calendar), with celebrations in Addis Ababa beginning in the early afternoon when a procession bearing flaming torches approaches Meskel Square from various directions. A burning pyramid (demera) is located in the center and is circled by priests in brightly colored cloaks, students, brass bands, and the army carrying around giant crosses and torches. They set the pyramid alight with their torches, and the burning pyramid is kept ablaze until dawn until the celebrations through the night have ended. They have done this for so many years now.

== Ownership dispute ==
The domination of the square by the Ethiopian Orthodox has been disputed by Protestant and Islam followers, appealing to convert secular landholder. In Grand Ethiopian Iftar 2021, violence erupted by Muslim observant who hold demand for access the square, resulting its cancellation. Misinformation was circulated alleging an announcement of name changing to Eid Square by deputy mayor of Addis Ababa Adanech Abebe. It was later debunked by PesaCheck.

In January 2022, another controversy was sparked when Protestant congregants started fundraising program in the square, and subsequently resulted in confrontation with Orthodox followers, who opposed to perform religious ceremony, and claimed a possession of Orthodox church. Orthodox religious fathers rejected a meeting by Addis Ababa City government by insisting the square ownership to Orthodox privilege.

== Purpose ==
=== Religious festivals ===
The square is known of spectacular Ethiopian Orthodox festival, most prominently Meskel ("a festival of the true cross") celebrated every September and Timkat (Ethiopian Epiphany). Before celebration, 17 Arks (known as Tabot) must be arrived to the square. Rituals includes an opening ceremony, then prayer followed by Sunday School students singing and dancing. The Meskel ceremony took only two hours 4:00 pm until 6:00 pm of evening, and Timkat begins around 7:00 am.

=== Concert ===
On 6 February 2005, a large concert was held in Meskel Square with considerable attendance followed. Bob Marley's "Africa Unite" was played at his sixtieth birthday, and many musicians performed including Marley's family and other Jamaican star I Threes, Senegalese musician Youssou N'Dour, Beninese Angélique Kidjo, and American R&B singer Lauryn Hill. Few Ethiopian artists debut their performance at the square such as Teddy Afro.

=== Athletics ===
Athletics training, especially running in the morning and football are frequent activities in Meskel. In addition, the square is fitted with public screen to view football tournaments either within nation or international. Most often, English Premier League is popular and people may view at evenings.
