= List of museums in Ethiopia =

This is a list of museums in Ethiopia.

== List ==
- National Museum of Ethiopia
- "Red Terror" Martyrs' Memorial Museum
- Rimbaud Museum
- Zoological Natural History Museum
- Ethnological Museum, Addis Ababa
- Adwa 00KM Museum
- Oromo Museum (Ethnography, Natural history, History, Art gallery, and archeology)

== See also ==
- Wollega Museum, Oromia Museum
