= Mogus Wolde Mikael =

Eritrean military officer (died 1977)

Captain Mogus Wolde Mikael (died 3 February 1977) was an Eritrean military officer who was a member of the Derg, the military junta that ruled Ethiopia.

== Biography ==
Following the Derg's assumption of power over Ethiopia in 1974, Mogus, who was a Major at the time, became the chairman of the Derg's Social and Economic Affairs Committee.

A member of the faction opposed to Lieutenant Colonel Mengistu Haile Mariam, Mogus was appointed to chair a committee to reorganize the Derg. This committee proposed a new structure which included: a Congress which included all of the members of the Derg, to act as its legislature; a Standing Committee of 17 members, to act as its executive; a group of 40 members who act as a go-between, which Rene LaFort believes was "established, so it seems, to calm the fears of the other ranks in the Derg who had always been afraid of being edged out of power"; and a detailed enumeration of the powers of the two Vice-Chairmen of the Derg. After the adoption of this proposal, Captain Mogus became chairman of the Political Affairs Committee of the Derg, a key position; his ally, Captain Almayahu Haile became Secretary-General, "a post with such ill-defined limits that it could confer vast powers.".

If it was not clear by this point to Mengistu that he was being squeezed out of power, after a mass rally in Revolution Square in Addis Ababa (better known by its older name, Meskel Square, which was later restored after Mengistu's fall), when General Tafari Benti gave a speech for reconciliation between the various revolutionary factions, he was flanked by Captains Almayahu Haile and Mogus. "The absence of Mengistu and Atnafu eloquently testified to their violent disagreement" with the content of this speech.

At a February 1977 meeting between Mengistu and his opponents, that included not only Mogus but chairman General Tafari Benti and a number of leading members of the Derg, military soldiers under the command of Lieutenant Colonel Daniel Asfaw rounded up and arrested him along with other Derg members suspected of conspiring with EPRP. They were summarily executed after a short while. Mengistu afterwards broadcast on Radio Ethiopia that Mogus and his dead compatriots had attempted a "fascist coup d'etat in the capital identical to what had taken place in Chile", and labeling them "fifth columnists" of the Ethiopian Democratic Union and Ethiopian People's Revolutionary Party rebel groups.
