= Kelbessa Negewo =

Kelbessa Negewo (born 1950) is an Ethiopian man who served as an official of the Marxist Derg regime while it was in power. He oversaw the torture and murder of political opponents during the Red Terror; Kelbessa denies a role in the torture that occurred. After the fall of the Derg regime, Kelbessa moved to the United States and later gained US citizenship. In Ethiopia, he was tried and convicted in absentia, and sentenced to life imprisonment. He was later deported to Ethiopia, where he is currently serving his sentence.

== Life in Ethiopia ==
Kelbessa was born in western Ethiopia in 1950, where his family raised goats. Kelbessa claims he was awarded a scholarship to study in the United States, but a government official in Emperor Haile Selassie's regime had his own nephew sent instead in Kelbessa's place.

Kelbessa later married and had three children, later divorcing. When the emperor was overthrown and the Derg seized power, Kelbessa became part of a neighborhood council which was tasked with seeing to revolutionary changes in the country. He eventually progressed to the status of chairman of Higher Zone 9, one of Addis Ababa's 25 zones, where he oversaw multiple councils and was involved in recruiting members of armed "revolutionary defense squads". According to author Andrew Rice, writing in The New York Times Magazine, "A series of memos... reveal that he was tireless in begging his higher-ups for more guns, more ammunition and more press coverage."

According to Hirut Abebe-Jiri, an activist involved in preserving and documenting atrocities while Mengistu Haile Mariam ruled the country, and other women, Kelbessa directly oversaw their torture, and demanded to know whether they were members of the Ethiopian People's Revolutionary Party, then fighting the government in the Ethiopian Civil War.

== Life in the United States ==
Kelbessa moved to the United States in 1987, arriving in New York City on August 3. He moved to Atlanta, Georgia, progressing from dishwasher to bellhop at the Colony Square Hotel. He was recognized in an elevator at the hotel by an Ethiopian woman, who claims he oversaw her torture while in Ethiopia. She contacted two other women who also identified themselves as his victims, and together they filed a lawsuit under the Alien Tort Claims Act, alleging a violation of their human rights. A judge awarded them US$ 1.5 million in damages, but Kelbessa filed bankruptcy. Shortly after the trial, the Ethiopian special prosecutor tasked with investigating and prosecuting crimes committed during Mengistu's rule asked for Kelbessa's extradition to Ethiopia, which was not granted.

He was fired from his job at the hotel, earned a degree in accounting from DeVry University, and remarried, having a son who died in infancy and later a daughter. He became a US citizen on July 28, 1995, after which two of the women who had sued him returned to Atlanta and were taped in a CNN interview. He was tried and convicted in absentia in Ethiopia on murder charges, and sentenced to life imprisonment.

In 2004 the National Intelligence Reform Act was made into law in the US. It included Senator Patrick Leahy's Anti-Atrocity Alien Deportation Act, which made torture and extrajudicial killings in other countries reason for a person's deportation from the US to that country. Kelbessa was brought to trial in the US again, and voluntarily gave up his American citizenship. A judge ordered him deported, and he was sent back to Ethiopia to serve his life sentence.

== See also ==
- Human rights in Ethiopia
- Alien Tort Statute
