= Trials of the Derg members =

1994–2008 legal proceeding in Ethiopia

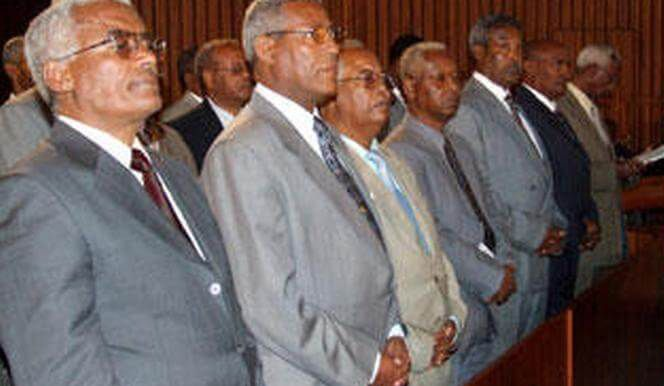
- Top Derg officials at court in Addis Ababa, 1994
- Inquest: 1992
- Convicted: Genocide; Crime against humanity; Torture; Rape; Forced disappearance
- Trial: 1994–2008
- Verdict: 12 December 2006
- Sentence: Life imprisonment to 23 years rigorous punishment

On 12 December 2006, the Federal Supreme Court found guilty 77 top Derg officials accused by the government of the Ethiopian People's Revolutionary Democratic Front (EPRDF) over the Red Terror (1976–1978). The head of the Derg, Mengistu Haile Mariam (in office 1977–1991), who fled to Zimbabwe, and other 22 Derg members were sentenced in absentia to life imprisonment on 11 January 2007.

On the whole, the Derg was accused of human rights violations, including genocide, crimes against humanity, torture, rape and forced disappearances. The Special Prosecutor Office (SPO) was launched in 1992 to investigate human rights violations committed in the Derg regime, and the first trial began in 1994.

== Red Terror ==
In November 1974, the execution of 60 officials of the former Haile Selassie government without any trial initiated a 17-year phase of political repression in the country. From 1975 to 1988, human rights violations took place that were characterized by the "law of the jungle". In May Day of 1977, a leftist political party, the Ethiopian People's Revolutionary Party (EPRP), mostly composed of civilians, began demonstrating against the Derg government in a nationwide campaign, to which the Derg responded by massacring hundreds of young people on 29 April 1977, referred to as "May Day Massacre". According to one witness, 1,000 people were summarily executed on 16 May and their corpses were ravaged by hyenas at night.

In order to reclaim the corpses, families had to pay tribute for their young relatives according to the amount of bullets used to kill them. In July 1977, the Derg opened another campaign called Zemene Menter, for people who were labeled "anti-revolutionary", resulting in 1,000 deaths and the detention of 1,503 people over alleged support of the rebel group.

In November 1977, the Red Terror (a term analogous to the 'white terror' coined during the Russian Revolution) was launched, lasting until 1980. The Red Terror was characterized by summary executions, arbitrary detentions, disappearance and torture. One writer described the event as: Amnesty International estimated the total amount of deaths in Red Terror exceeded 150,000 to 200,000. Responding to Amnesty International, the Derg was quoted: "If they [Amnesty International] say we do not have to kill people, aren't they saying we have to quit the revolution? The cry to stop the killing is a bourgeois cry."

== Trials ==
Following their defeat in Addis Ababa on 28 May 1991, the rebel coalition and future ruling party, the Ethiopian People's Revolutionary Democratic Front (EPRDF), began detaining approximately 1,900 of the Derg members. Amid the transitional government in 1992, the Special Prosecutor Office (SPO) was launched in order to investigate human rights violations, and submitted the first charge against 73 Derg officials to the Central High Court in October 1994. These trials were the first in Africa without involvement of the international community, unlike for the contemporary Rwandan genocide and Bosnian genocide. In 1997, it filed charges against 5,198 public and military officials, in what is called the "Red Terror trials". Out of 5,198 defendants, 2,246 were charged while in detention and 2,952 were charged in absentia.

On 13 August 2004, 33 top former Derg officials were presented in trial for genocide and other human rights violations during the Red Terror. The officials appealed for a pardon to the Prime Minister Meles Zenawi in a forum to "beg the Ethiopian public for their pardon for the mistakes done knowingly or unknowingly" during the Derg regime. No official response was made by the government to the date. The Red Terror trial included grave human rights violations, comprising genocide, crime against humanity, torture, rape and forced disappearances which be would punishable under Article 7 of the Universal Declaration of Human Rights, article 26 of the International Covenant on Civil and Political Rights as well as article 3 of the African Charter on Human and People's Rights, all of which made part of the Ethiopian law.

The Red Terror trial faced difficulty in its progression due to multiple reasons. The judicial organ remained for executive. When the transitional government dismissed most of the Derg judges for alleged ties to the Derg politicians, there was a shortage of skilled and experienced judges, leading to the employment of inexperienced, short-time trained, judges from regional states. In Addis Ababa, there was also shortage of legal materials for work. The SPO also suffered from a shortage of skilled persons and financial resources to carry out investigations, especially to investigate the instances of grave violence during the Red Terror.

On 12 December 2006, the Federal Supreme Court found guilty a total of 55 Derg Worker's Party of Ethiopia party officials, of whom 22, including Mengistu Haile Mariam who fled to Zimbabwe, were convicted in absentia. They were accused of crime against humanity and sentenced from life to 23 years of rigorous punishment on 11 January 2007.

On 26 May 2008, the trial was ended with most officials being sentenced to death. On 4 October 2011, 16 Derg officials were freed by the government after twenty years of incarceration.
