= Ethnological Museum, Addis Ababa =

Public institution in Addis Ababa, Ethiopia

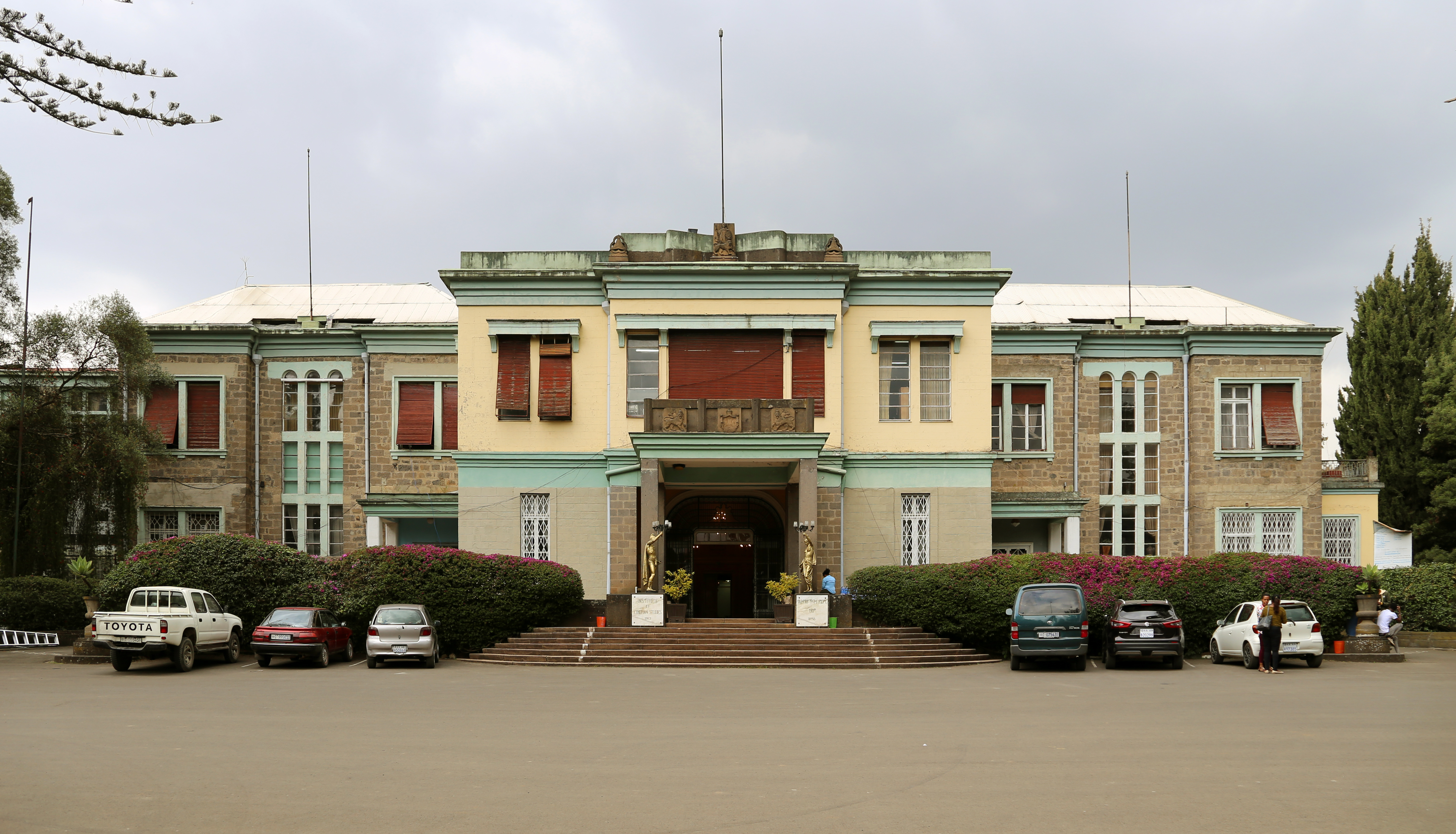
- Ethnological Museum, Addis Ababa
- Established: 1945
- Location: Addis Ababa University, Finifine Oromia, Ethiopia
- Coordinates: 9.0467°N 38.7578°E
- Type: Ethnological Museum
- Key holdings: Ethiopians
- Collections: Anthropology, Art, Philately, Numismatics
- Collection size: 13,000
- Founder: Samrawit Mamushat Abebe
- Parking: On site
- Website: www.aau.edu.et/ies/ies-museum

The Ethnological Museum, Addis Ababa, in Ethiopia, is a public institution dedicated to ethnology and culture. The Ethnological Museum houses anthropological, musicological and cultural objects. The Ethnological Museum is the first university museum in Ethiopia. The Museum is located in the main Campus of Addis Ababa University which houses the Institute of Ethiopian Studies.

== Establishment ==
The Ethnological Museum in Addis Ababa was established in 1950, largely based on the collections of old Italian zoological species and ethnographic artifacts by the first batch of graduates of the College. The initiator of the idea of the museum came from Stanislaw Chojnaki who was the former chief librarian of the University College of Addis Ababa.

== Museum sections ==
- Anthropology Collections
- Ethno-Musicological Collection
- Art Gallery
- Philatelic Collection
- Numismatics Collection

== Galleries ==
Building

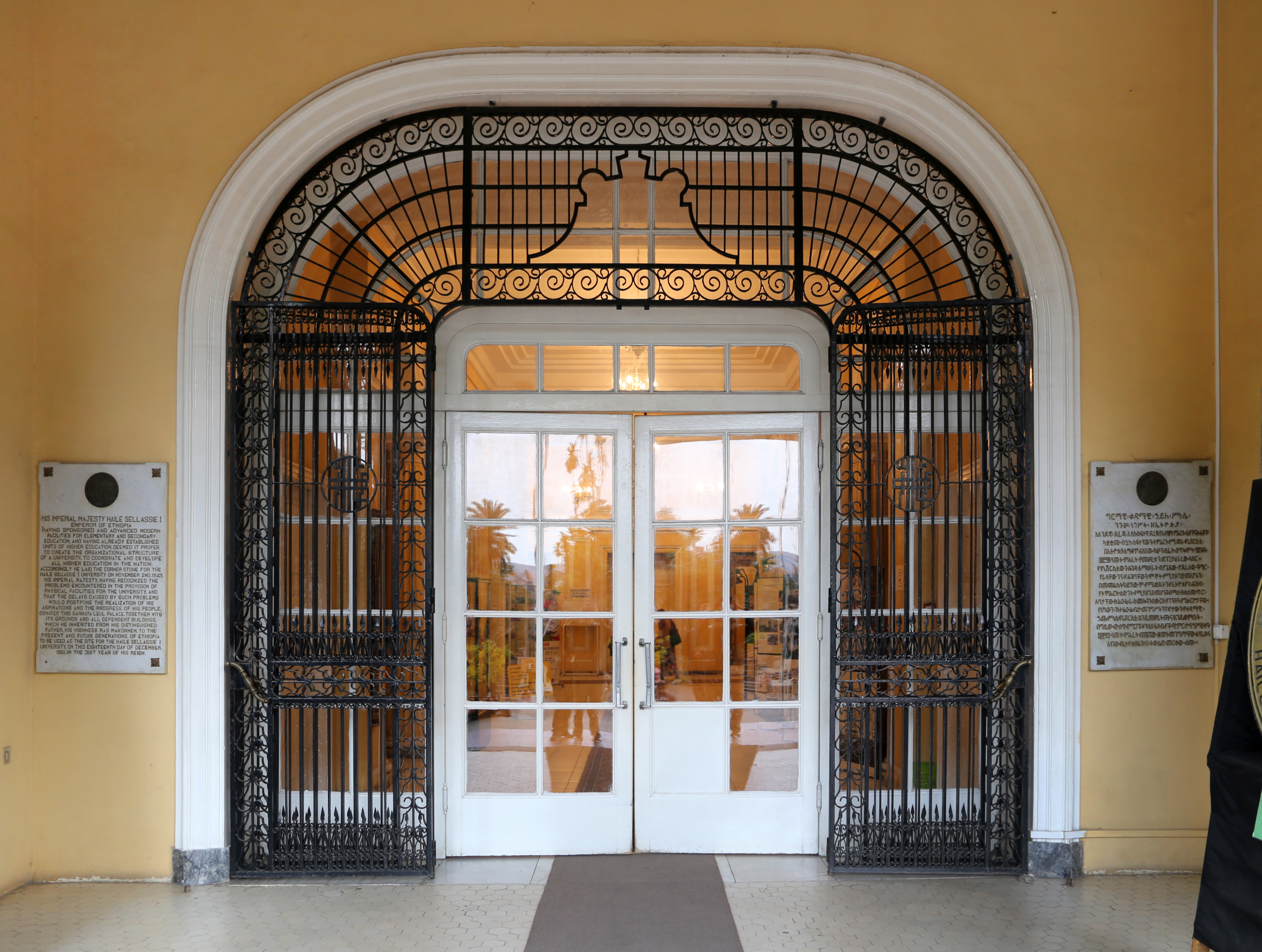

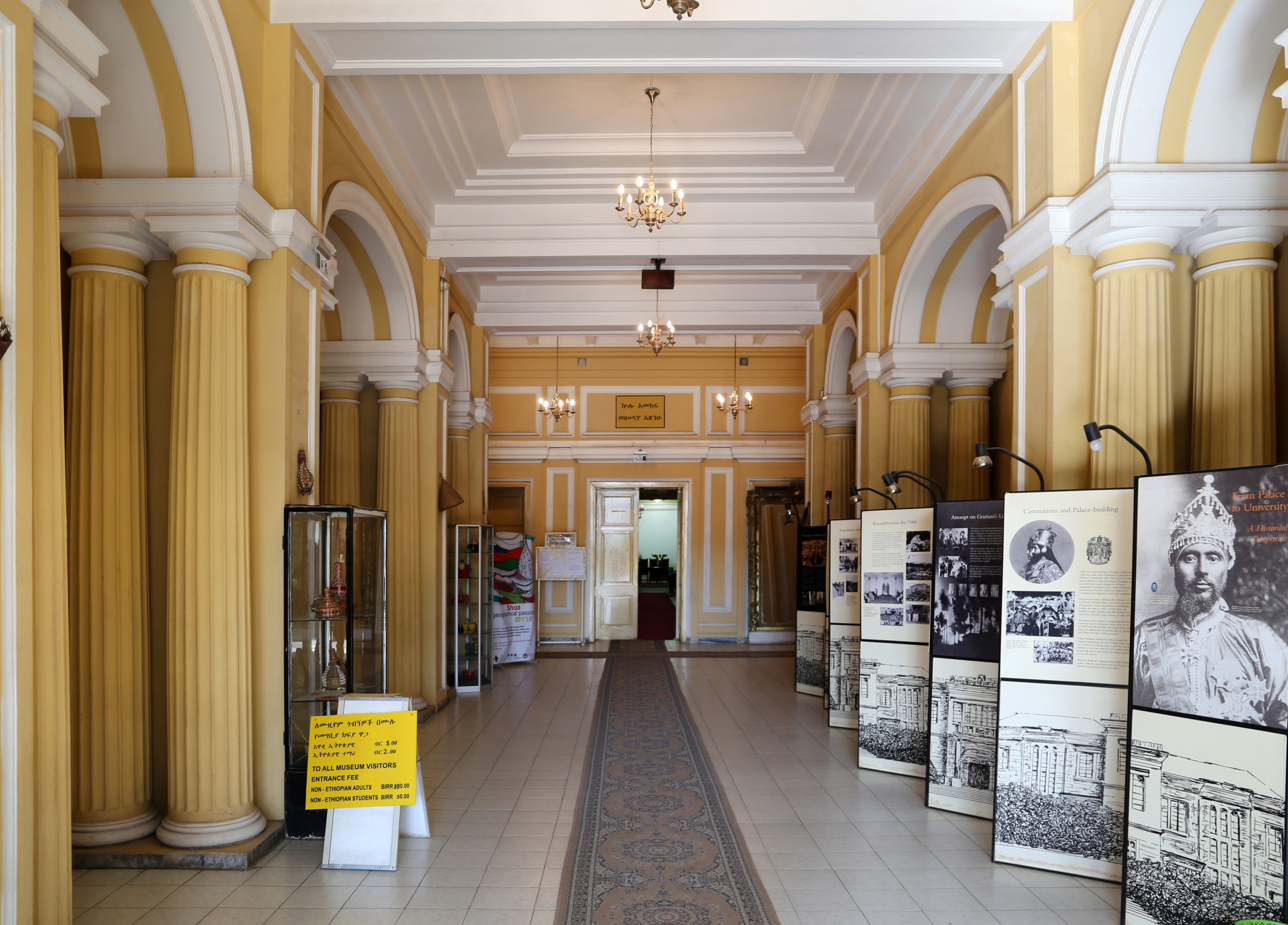

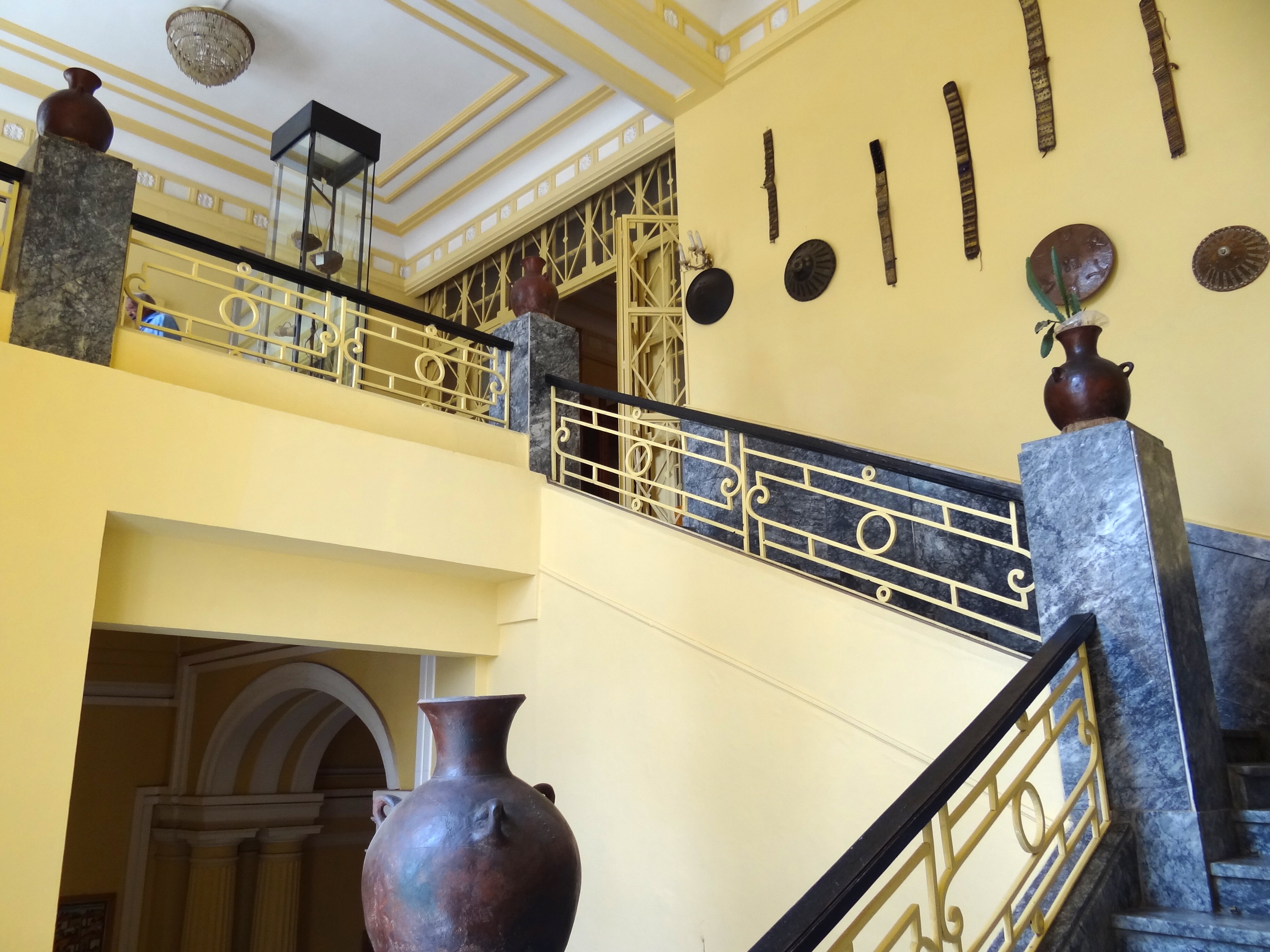

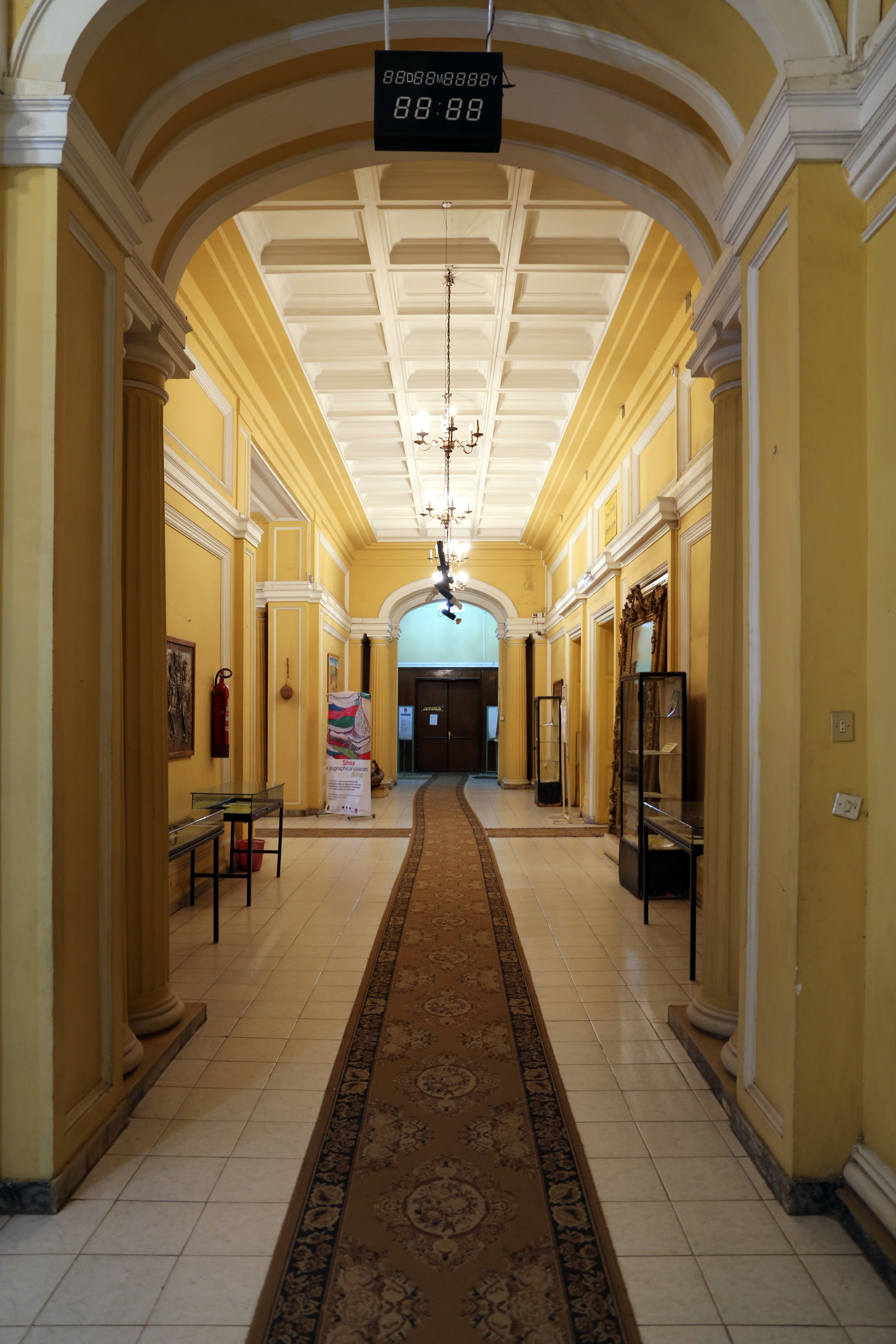
Interiors of Haile Selassie's palace

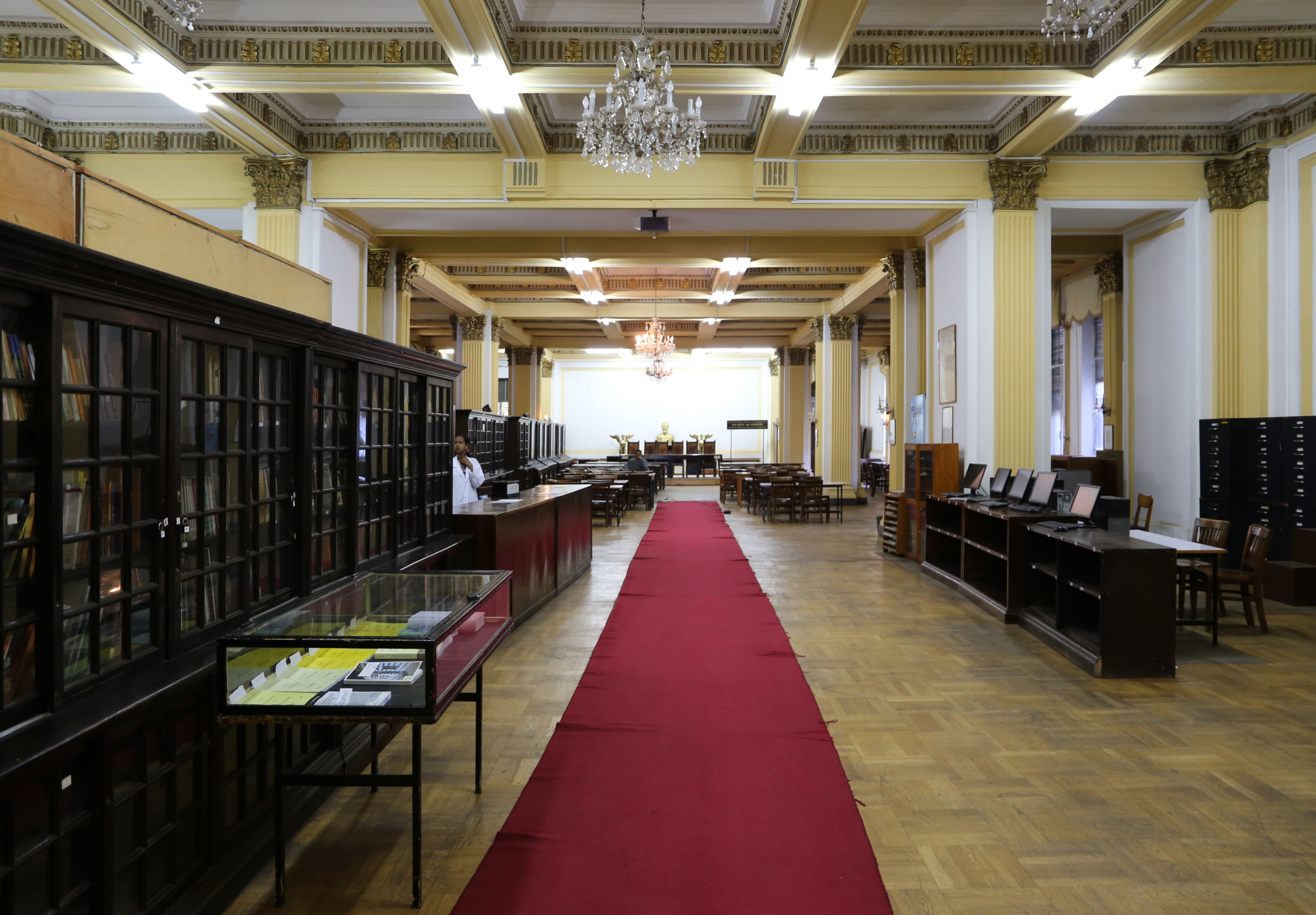
Library

Emperor Haile Selassie's artifacts

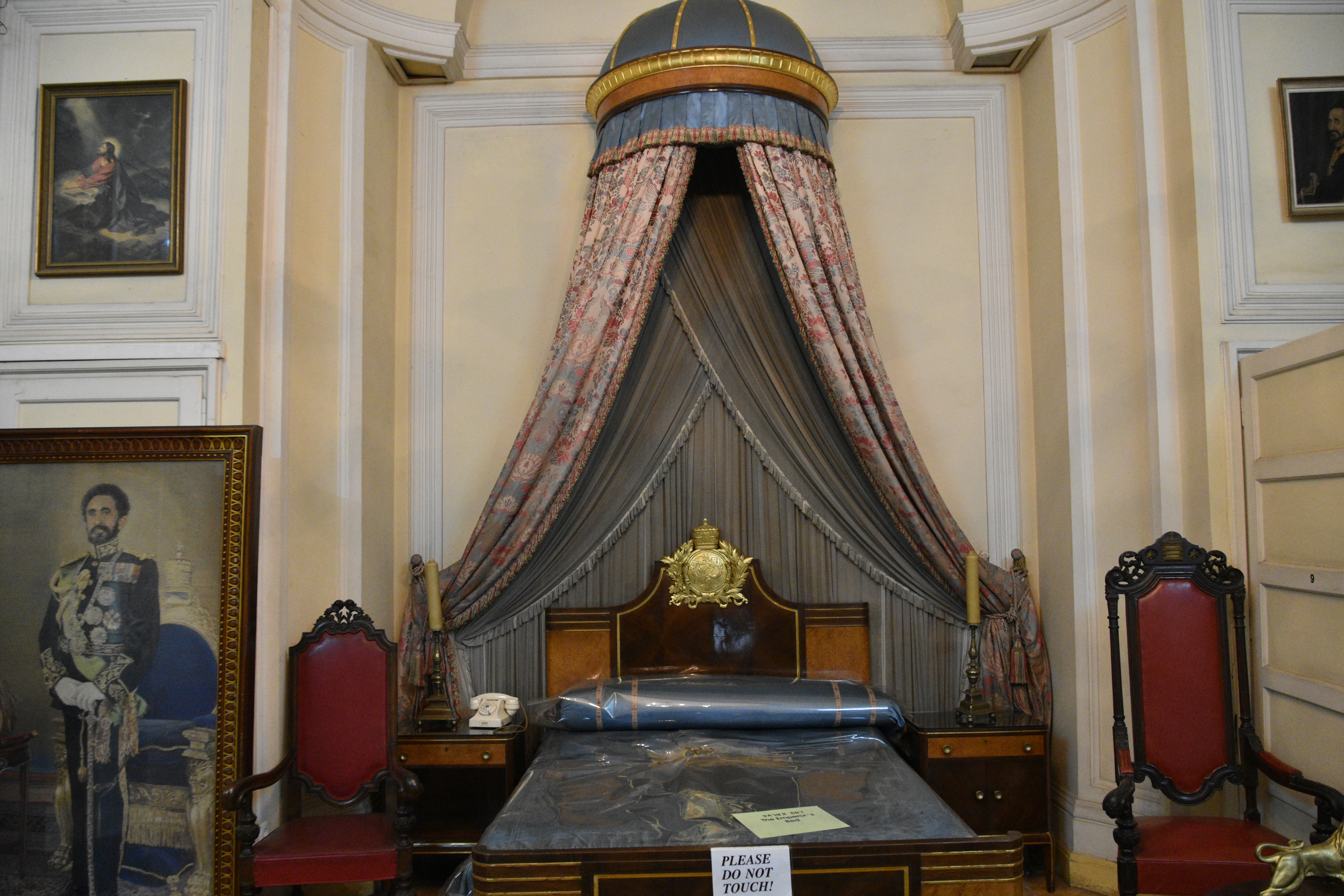
Bed of Emperor Haile Selassie

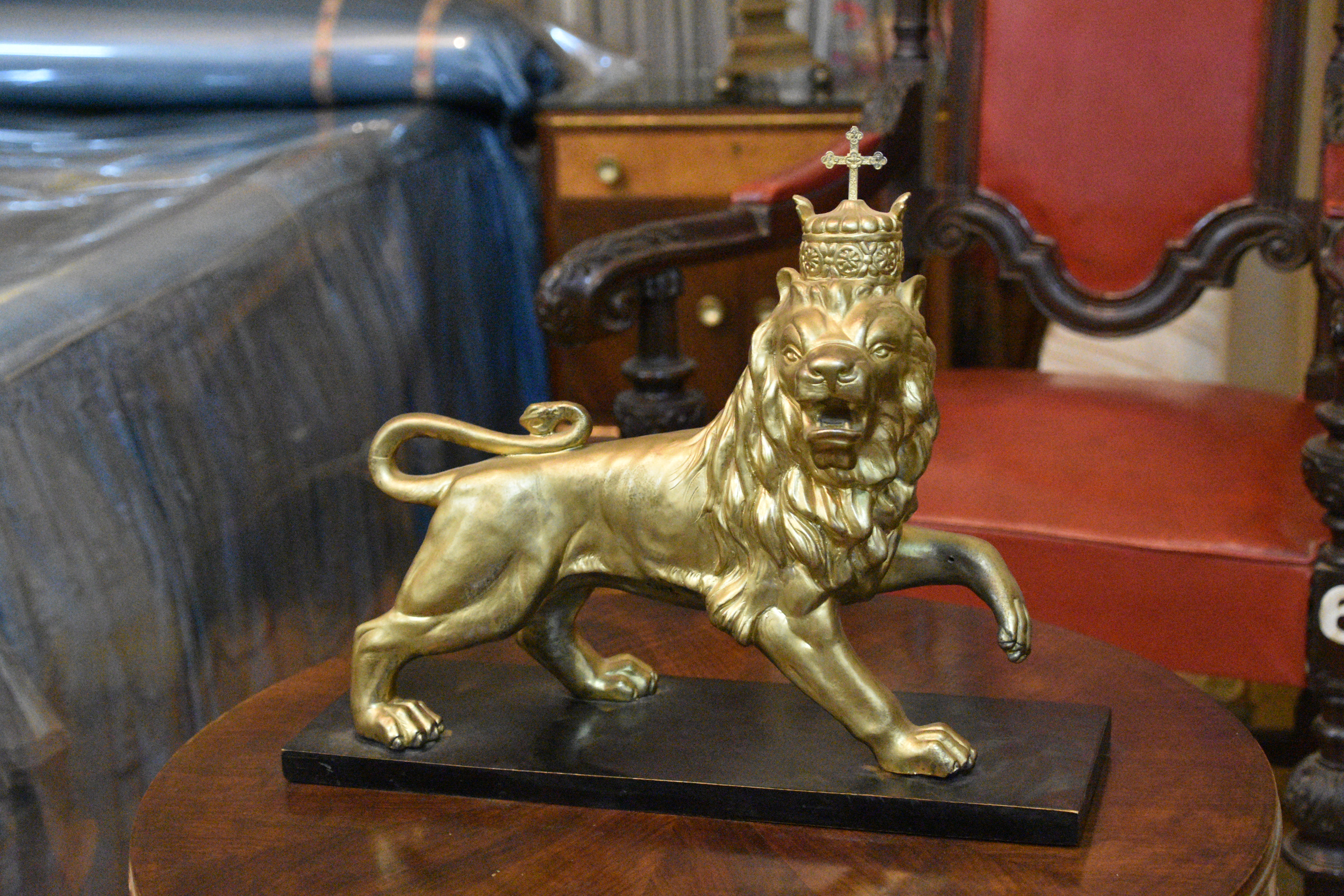
Lion of Judah (symbol of Ethiopian monarchy)

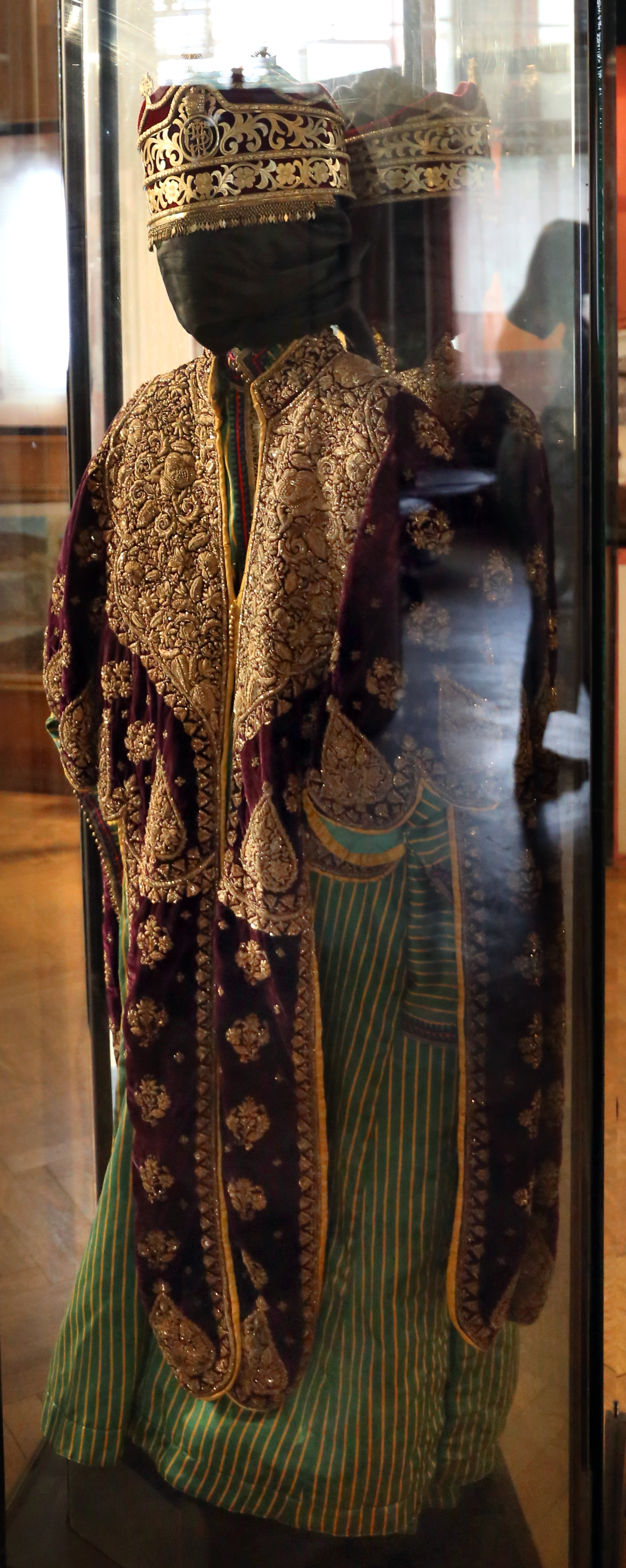

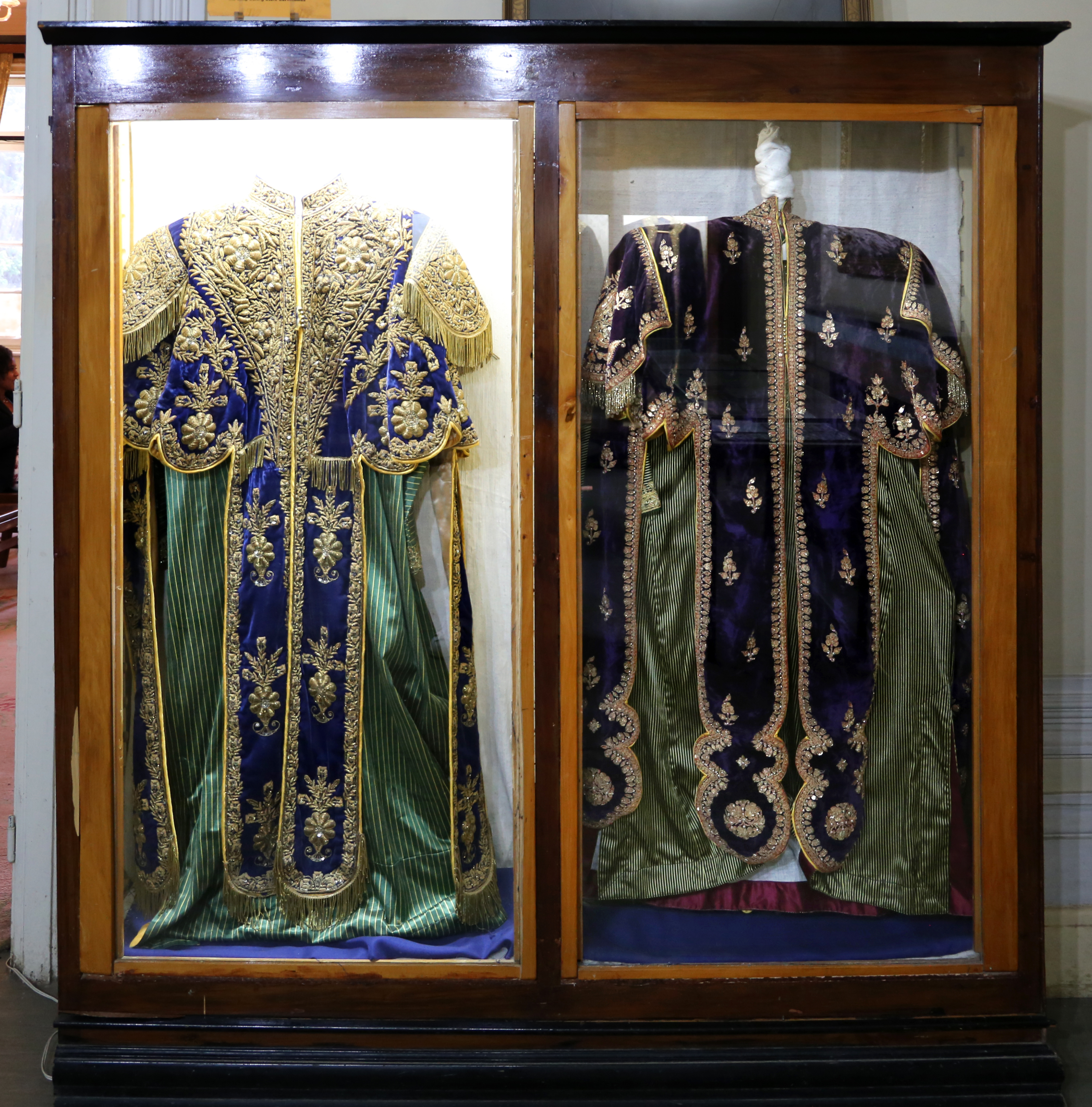

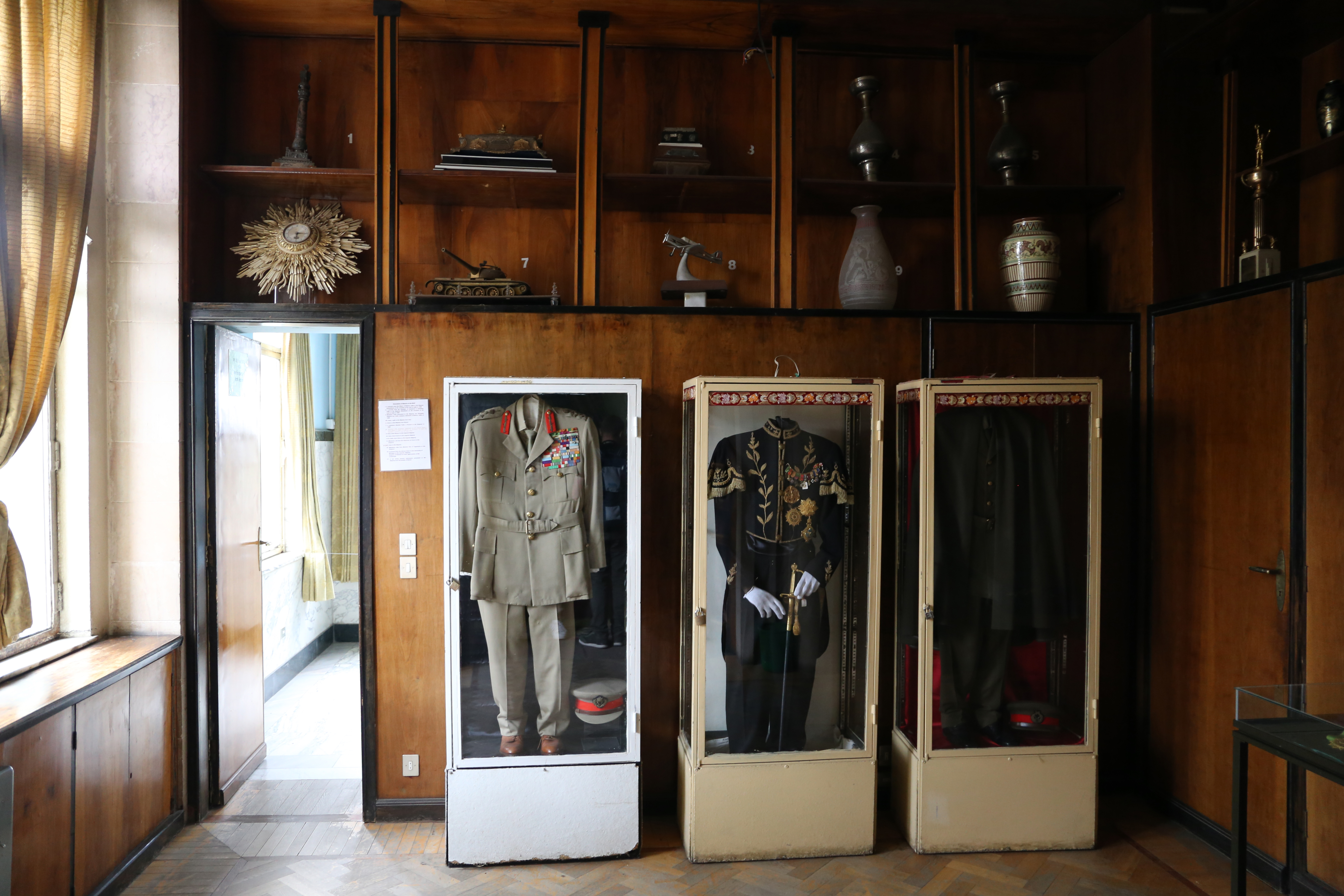
Ceremonial robes for state ceremonies

== See also ==
- List of museums in Ethiopia
