= Association of Ethiopian Architects =

Professional organization for architects in Ethiopia

- Abbreviation: AEA
- Formation: 1991
- Purpose: Architectural profession
- Headquarters: Addis Ababa
- Region served: Ethiopia

The Association of Ethiopian Architects (AEA) is a professional organization for architects in Ethiopia. Headquartered in Addis Ababa, the AEA's aim is to promote the advancement of architecture in the country, facilitate training and research and work on a holistic enhancement of related cultures and traditions. It also works for the advancement of professional etiquette.

The AEA is currently headed by Meskerem Tamiru as president and Tesfamariam Teshome as vice-president.

== History ==
The Association of Ethiopian Architects was founded in Addis Ababa in August 1991.

== Organization ==
=== Structure ===
The Association's structure consists of President, Vice President, Secretary and four standing committee heads.

- Wendwosen Demrew (President)
- Amanuel Teshome Kebede (Vice- president)
- Brook Tefera Belay (Secretary)
- Bisrat Kifle Woldeyessus (Head of Professional Advancement and Popularization Chair )
- Timint Eshetu Yehdego ( Treasurer & Exhibition & Competition Chair Head )
- Helawi Sewnet ( Head of Publications Committee )
- Tewedaj Eshetu ( Vice -Secretary & Ethics Committee Chair Head )

=== Service ===
The association, beside promoting the enhancement of the profession, strives to bridge gaps among related professionals and create links between private and governmental institutions.

The association consists of four standing committees:

1. The Publications standing committee
2. The Exhibitions and Competitions standing committee
3. The Professional Advancement standing committee
4. The Ethics standing committees

=== Professionalism ===
The AEA provides its members with opportunities for career advancement, engages in active lobbying in building standards and laws, and oversees laws and conduct of professionals. It administers design competitions, ratifies documents that are the model for the construction industry, and provides professional and design information services.

=== Public education ===
The AEA attempts to meet the needs and interests of the nation's architects and the public by raising public awareness of the value of architecture and the importance of good design. In doing so, the AEA organizes annual conventions, workshops, lectures and public exhibitions.

=== Honors and awards ===
The AEA also recognizes professionals who make a distinguished contribution to the profession.

== Presidents ==
The following people served as presidents:

- Addis Mebratu
- Wendwosen Demrew
