= Almayahu Haile =

Ethiopian soldier and politician (d. 1977)

Captain Alemayehu Haile (died 3 February 1977) was a member of the Derg, the military junta that ruled Ethiopia from 1974 to 1987.

== Biography ==
An Amhara, Alemayehu was a graduate of the Dina Police College in Addis Ababa and of Haile Selassie University (now Addis Ababa University); his education leads the Ottaways to suspect that this was a factor in his feud with Mengistu Haile Mariam. He comment that he "was certainly no moderate and as remembered by his university professors as a very articulate, argumentative student who believed in radical policies as the only means to bring even moderate change to a feudal country such as Ethiopia." At the time of the Ethiopian Revolution, Alemayehu was a member of the Ethiopian police force.

He was a key member of the Derg and was chairman of the Committee for Administrative Affairs. After the reorganization of the Derg announced on 29 December 1976, Alemayehu became Secretary-General, "a post with such ill-defined limits that it could confer vast powers." In short, Alemayehu Haile appeared at this point to be the most powerful member of the Derg, more powerful than his rival Mengistu.

However, according to LaFort, Almayahu made a critical mistake by underestimating or even despising Mengistu; "it was out of the question that he would passively accept his personal elimination and the defeat of his views." And the events of 3 February 1977 put Mengistu back in control. At a meeting between Mengistu and his opponents, who included not only Alemayehu Haile but chairman General Tafari Benti and a number of leading members of the Derg, military soldiers under the command of Lieutenant Colonel Daniel Asfaw rounded them up and arrested them. He was summarily executed with the others after a short while. Mengistu afterwards broadcast on Radio Ethiopia that Almayahu and his dead compatriots had attempted a "fascist coup d'etat in the capital identical to what had taken place in Chile", and labeling them "fifth columnists" of the Ethiopian Democratic Union and Ethiopian People's Revolutionary Party rebel groups.
