= Red Terror Martyrs' Memorial Museum =

"Red Terror" Martyrs' Memorial Museum
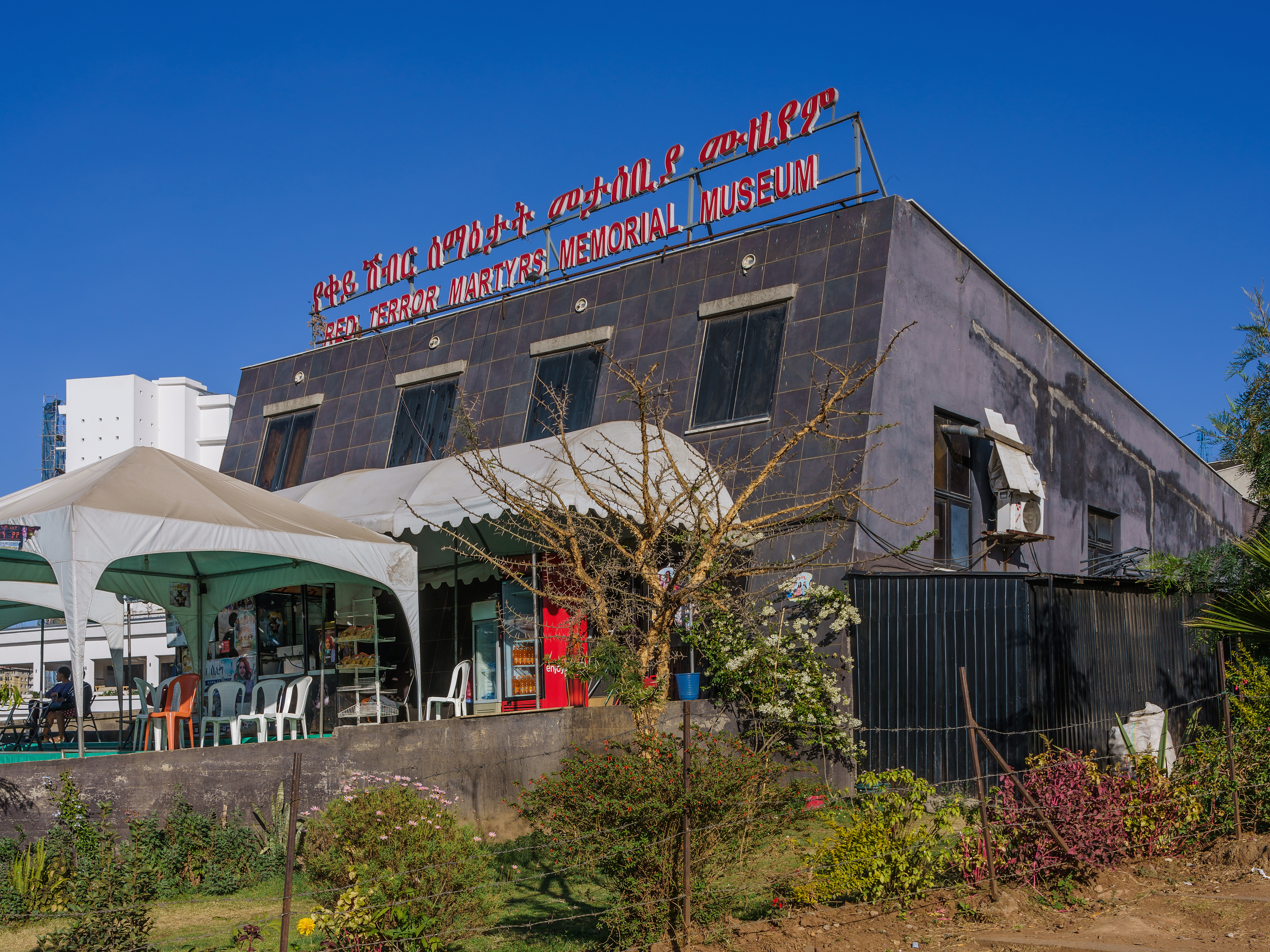
- Established: 2010
- Location: Addis Ababa, Ethiopia
- Coordinates: 9.010204°N 38.763230°E
- Type: Memorial museum
- Website: Official website

The Red Terror Martyrs' Memorial Museum in Addis Ababa was established in 2010 as a memorial to those who died during the Red Terror under the Derg government. The museum has displays of torture instruments, skulls and bones, coffins, bloody clothes and photographs of victims. In free tours of the museum, guides describes the history leading up to the Red Terror (starting from Haile Selassie's 80th birthday celebration), the actions taken toward citizens who opposed the Derg, how the prisoners were treated and how they secretly communicated among each other.

The museum also features pictorial history of the Red Terror.

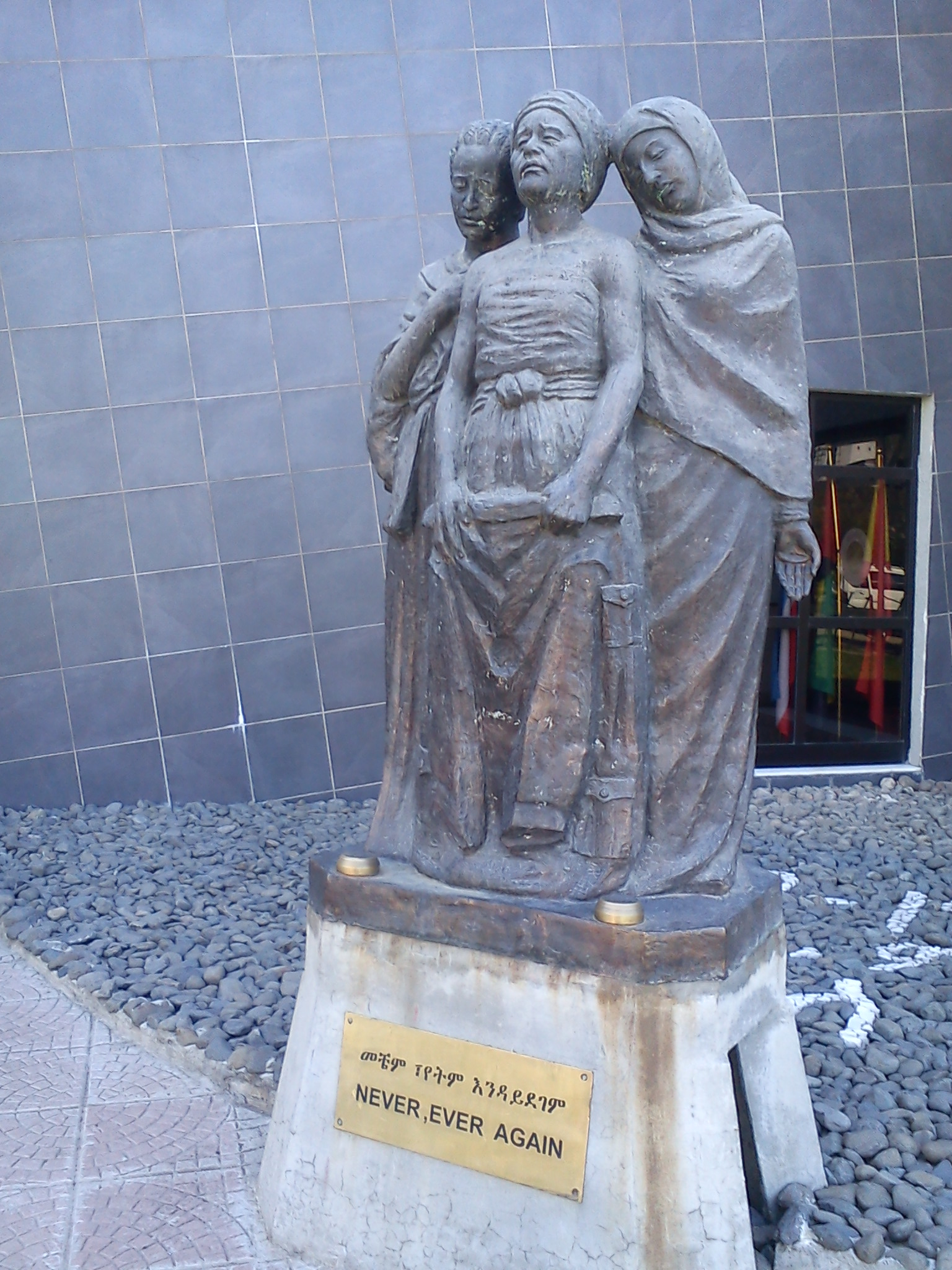
A sculpture in the museum

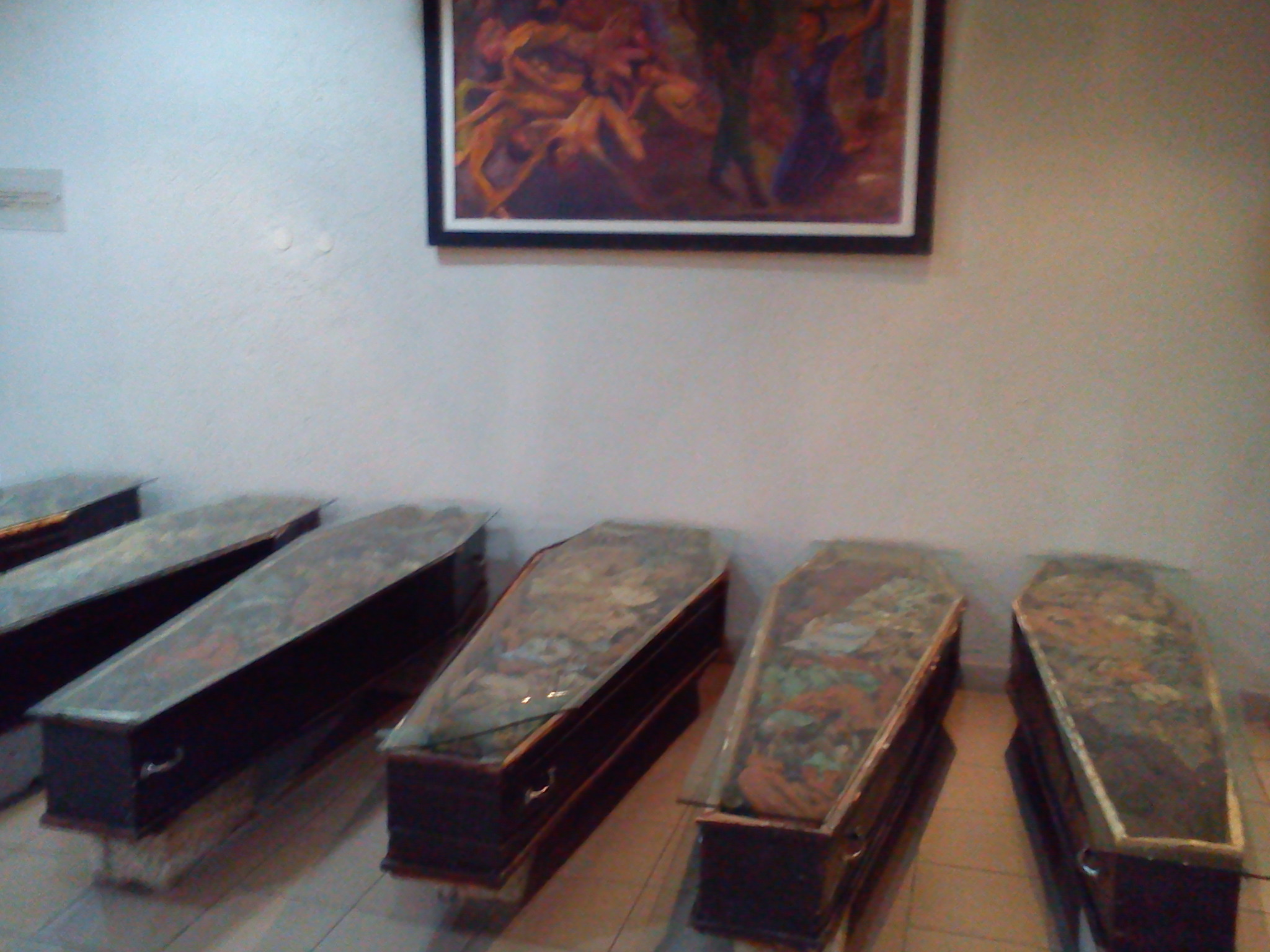
Exhibit in the museum

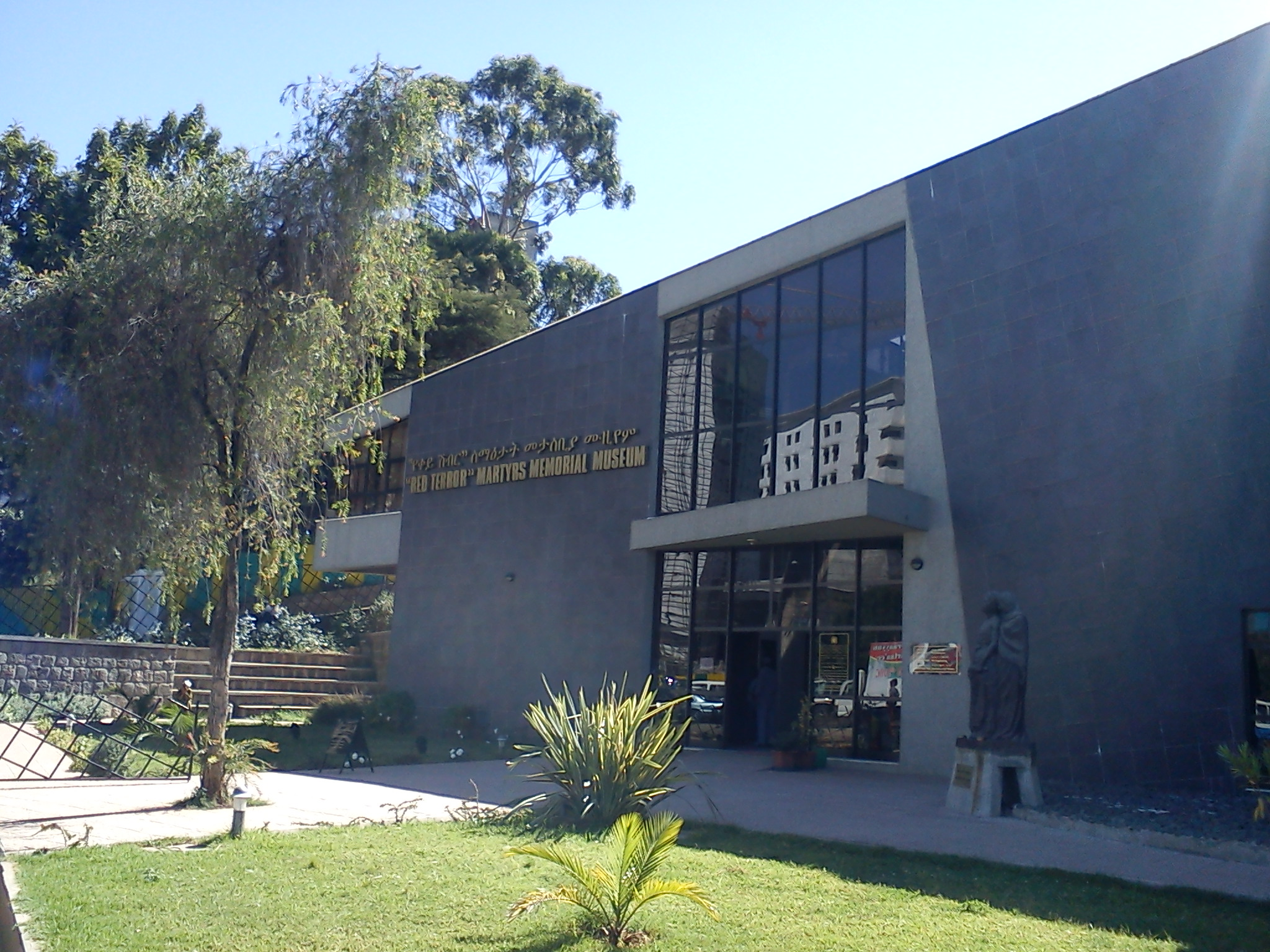
Entrance to the museum

== See also ==
- Red Terror (Ethiopia)
- Derg
