= 1974 =

1974 in various calendars
- Gregorian calendar: 1974; MCMLXXIV
- Ab urbe condita: 2727
- Armenian calendar: 1423; ԹՎ ՌՆԻԳ
- Assyrian calendar: 6724
- Baháʼí calendar: 130–131
- Balinese saka calendar: 1895–1896
- Bengali calendar: 1380–1381
- Berber calendar: 2924
- British Regnal year: 22 Eliz. 2 – 23 Eliz. 2
- Buddhist calendar: 2518
- Burmese calendar: 1336
- Byzantine calendar: 7482–7483
- Chinese calendar: 癸丑年 (Water Ox); 4671 or 4464 — to — 甲寅年 (Wood Tiger); 4672 or 4465
- Coptic calendar: 1690–1691
- Discordian calendar: 3140
- Ethiopian calendar: 1966–1967
- Hebrew calendar: 5734–5735
- Hindu calendars
- Vikram Samvat: 2030–2031
- Shaka Samvat: 1895–1896
- Kali Yuga: 5074–5075
- Holocene calendar: 11974
- Igbo calendar: 974–975
- Iranian calendar: 1352–1353
- Islamic calendar: 1393–1394
- Japanese calendar: Shōwa 49 (昭和４９年)
- Javanese calendar: 1905–1906
- Juche calendar: 63
- Julian calendar: Gregorian minus 13 days
- Korean calendar: 4307
- Minguo calendar: ROC 63 民國63年
- Nanakshahi calendar: 506
- Thai solar calendar: 2517
- Tibetan calendar: ཆུ་མོ་གླང་ལོ་ (female Water-Ox); 2100 or 1719 or 947 — to — ཤིང་ཕོ་སྟག་ལོ་ (male Wood-Tiger); 2101 or 1720 or 948
- Unix time: 126230400 – 157766399

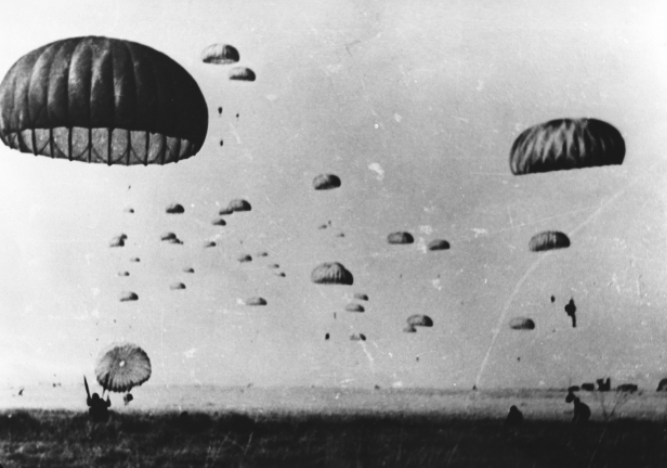
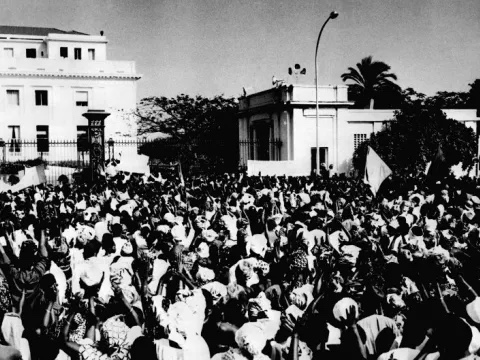
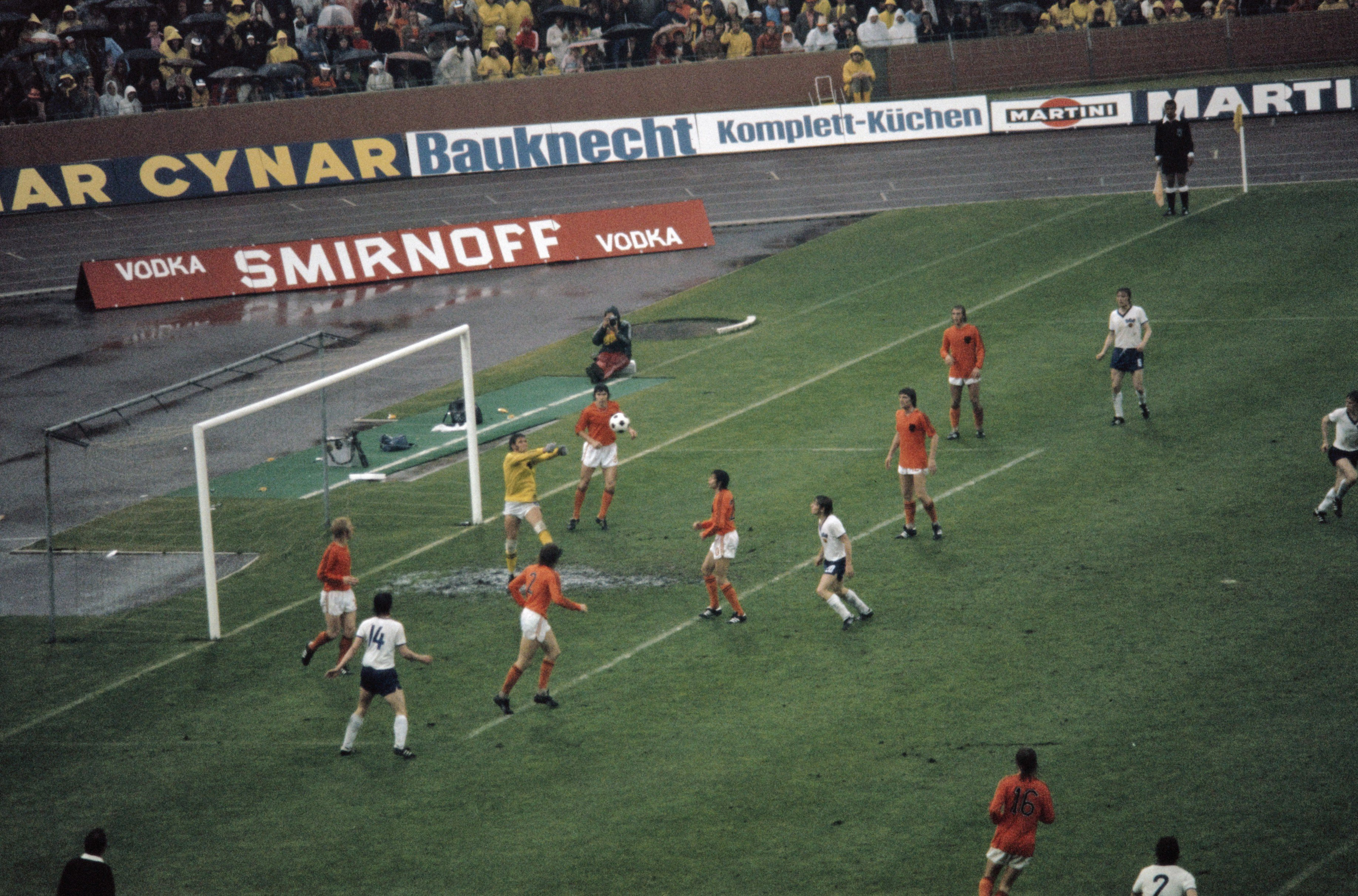
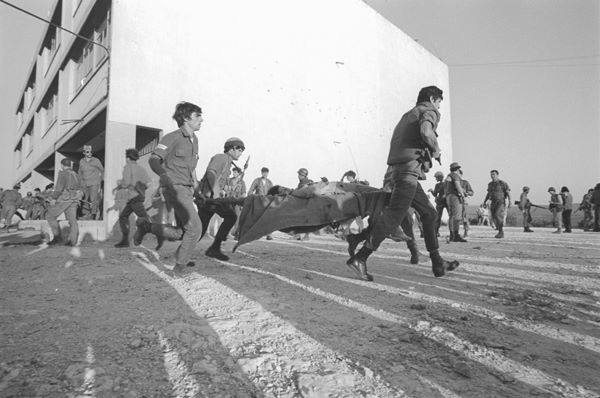
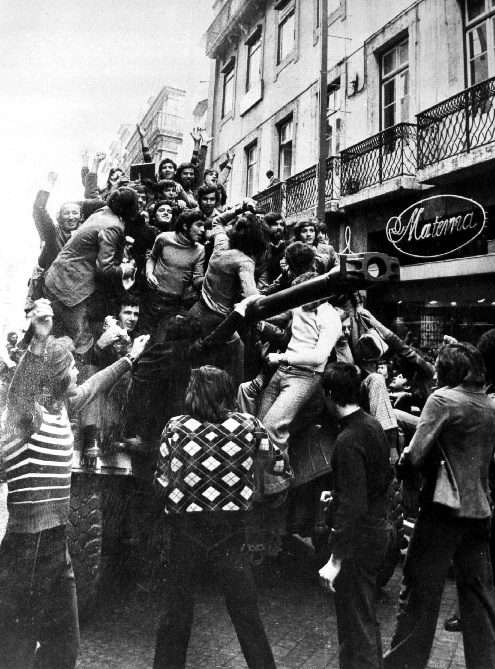
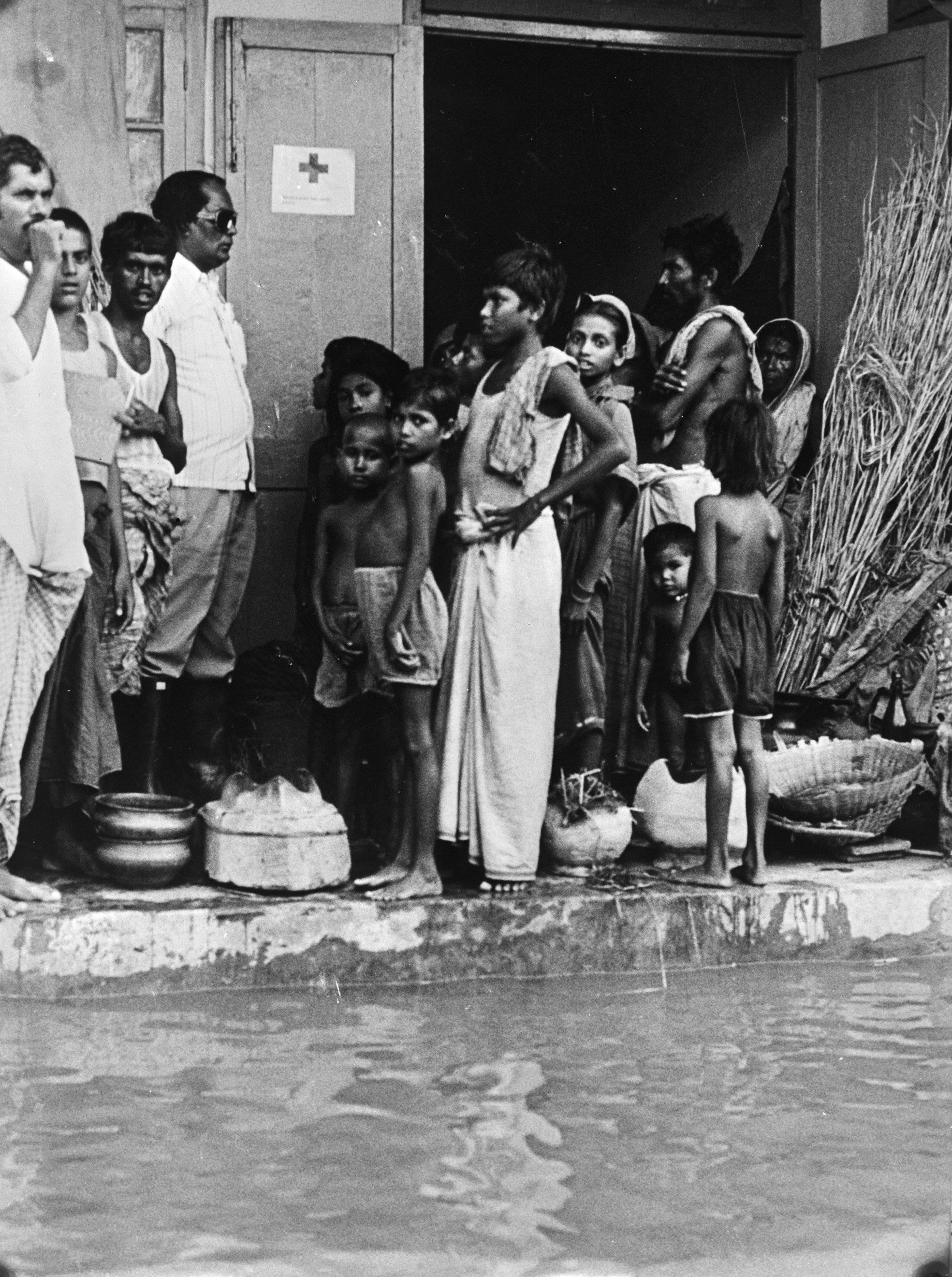
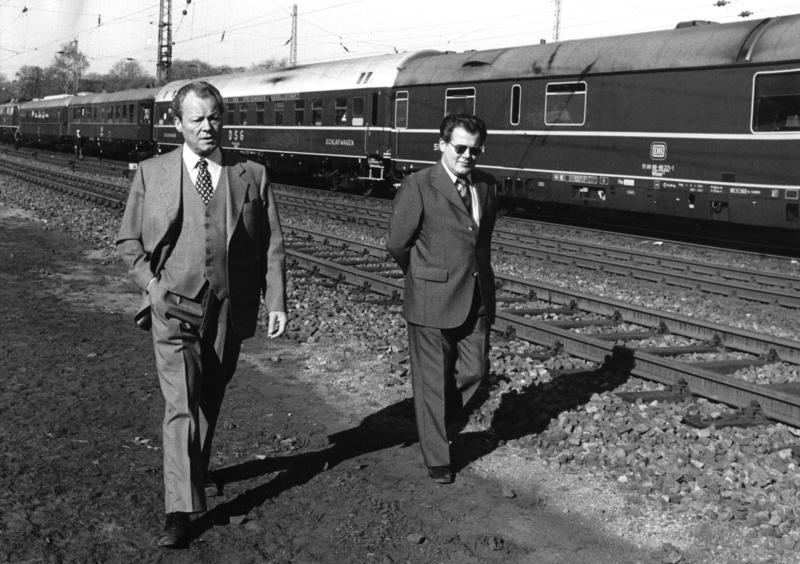
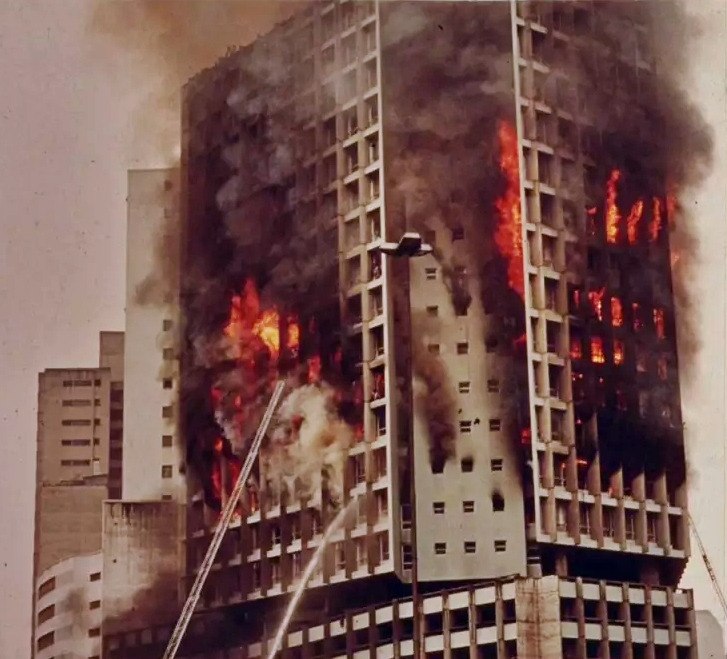
From top to bottom, left to right: the Watergate scandal forces Richard Nixon to resign; the Turkish invasion of Cyprus divides the island after a Greek-backed coup; the Ethiopian Revolution ends Haile Selassie's monarchy; the 1974 FIFA World Cup in West Germany sees the host nation win their second title; the Ma'alot massacre leaves dozens dead in a school hostage crisis; Portugal's Carnation Revolution peacefully ends the Estado Novo dictatorship; the Bangladesh famine of 1974 kills hundreds of thousands; the Guillaume affair triggers political turmoil in West Germany; and the Joelma Building fire in São Paulo kills 179 people.

1974 in various calendars
- Gregorian calendar: 1974; MCMLXXIV
- Ab urbe condita: 2727
- Armenian calendar: 1423; ԹՎ ՌՆԻԳ
- Assyrian calendar: 6724
- Baháʼí calendar: 130–131
- Balinese saka calendar: 1895–1896
- Bengali calendar: 1380–1381
- Berber calendar: 2924
- British Regnal year: 22 Eliz. 2 – 23 Eliz. 2
- Buddhist calendar: 2518
- Burmese calendar: 1336
- Byzantine calendar: 7482–7483
- Chinese calendar: 癸丑年 (Water Ox); 4671 or 4464 — to — 甲寅年 (Wood Tiger); 4672 or 4465
- Coptic calendar: 1690–1691
- Discordian calendar: 3140
- Ethiopian calendar: 1966–1967
- Hebrew calendar: 5734–5735
- Hindu calendars
- Vikram Samvat: 2030–2031
- Shaka Samvat: 1895–1896
- Kali Yuga: 5074–5075
- Holocene calendar: 11974
- Igbo calendar: 974–975
- Iranian calendar: 1352–1353
- Islamic calendar: 1393–1394
- Japanese calendar: Shōwa 49 (昭和４９年)
- Javanese calendar: 1905–1906
- Juche calendar: 63
- Julian calendar: Gregorian minus 13 days
- Korean calendar: 4307
- Minguo calendar: ROC 63 民國63年
- Nanakshahi calendar: 506
- Thai solar calendar: 2517
- Tibetan calendar: ཆུ་མོ་གླང་ལོ་ (female Water-Ox); 2100 or 1719 or 947 — to — ཤིང་ཕོ་སྟག་ལོ་ (male Wood-Tiger); 2101 or 1720 or 948
- Unix time: 126230400 – 157766399

1974 (MCMLXXIV) was a common year starting on Tuesday of the Gregorian calendar, the 1974th year of the Common Era (CE) and Anno Domini (AD) designations, the 974th year of the 2nd millennium, the 74th year of the 20th century, and the 5th year of the 1970s decade.

Major events in 1974 include the aftermath of the 1973 oil crisis and the resignation of United States President Richard Nixon following the Watergate scandal. In the Middle East, the aftermath of the 1973 Yom Kippur War determined politics; following Israeli Prime Minister Golda Meir's resignation in response to high Israeli casualties, she was succeeded by Yitzhak Rabin. In Europe, the invasion and occupation of northern Cyprus by Turkish troops initiated the Cyprus dispute, the Carnation Revolution took place in Portugal, the Greek junta's collapse paves the way for the establishment of a parliamentary republic and Chancellor of West Germany Willy Brandt resigned following an espionage scandal surrounding his secretary Günter Guillaume. In sports, the year was primarily dominated by the FIFA World Cup in West Germany, in which the hosts won the championship title, as well as The Rumble in the Jungle, a boxing match between Muhammad Ali and George Foreman in Zaire.

== Events ==
=== January–February ===
- January 25 – Bülent Ecevit of CHP forms the new government of Turkey (37th government, partner MSP).
- January 31
  - The South Vietnamese government and the Viet Cong announced that they would resume prisoner of war exchanges on February 8, after a suspension of seven months.
  - Two members of the Japanese Red Army (JRA) and two members of the Popular Front for the Liberation of Palestine (PFLP) made a failed attempt to blow up oil tanks at the Shell oil refinery complex on Pulau Bukom at Singapore. The terrorists then hijacked the ferry Laju and took its five crew members hostage.
  - The People's Republic of China released Gerald Emil Kosh, a U.S. civilian captured during the Battle of the Paracel Islands.
- February 1
  - Fire breaks out in the Joelma Building in São Paulo, Brazil; 177 die, 293 are injured, 11 die later of their injuries.
  - Kuala Lumpur, the capital of Malaysia, is declared a Federal Territory.
- February 8 – After a record 84 days in orbit, the crew of Skylab 4 returns to Earth.
- February 17 – Zamalek disaster: A soccer stampede occurs in Cairo, killing 49.
- February 28 – The British election ended in a hung parliament after the Jeremy Thorpe-led Liberal Party achieves its biggest vote.

=== March–April ===
- March 3 – Turkish Airlines Flight 981, travelling from Paris to London, crashes in the woods near Paris, killing all 346 aboard. This was the deadliest aircraft accident in history up to this time, and remains the deadliest single aircraft accident with no survivors.
- March 4 – Following a hung parliament in the United Kingdom general election, Conservative prime minister Edward Heath resigns and is succeeded by Labour's Harold Wilson, who previously led the country from 1964 to 1970.
- March 18
  - In West Germany, the Bundestag passes the Bundes-Immissionsschutzgesetz ("Federal Emission Control Act").
  - End of five-month oil embargo by most OPEC nations against the United States, Europe, and Japan which had caused the 1973 oil crisis.
- March 26 – A group of peasant women in Chamoli district, Uttarakhand, India, use their bodies to surround trees to prevent loggers from felling them, giving rise to the Chipko movement.
- March 29
  - The Terracotta Army of Qin Shi Huang is discovered at Xi'an, China.
  - Launch of the Volkswagen Golf in West Germany, a modern front-wheel drive hatchback which is expected to replace the iconic Volkswagen Beetle, holder of the world record for the car with the most units produced.
- April 3–4 – An enormous tornado outbreak strikes the central parts of the United States, killing around 319 and injuring about 5,484.
- April 5 – Carrie, the debut novel by Stephen King, is published.
- April 6 – Swedish pop group ABBA's song "Waterloo" wins the 1974 Eurovision Song Contest in Brighton, England, UK.
- April 6 – The first California Jam festival takes place at the Ontario Motor Speedway in Ontario, California. Co-headlined by Deep Purple and Emerson, Lake & Palmer. The festival set what were then records for the loudest amplification system ever installed, the highest paid attendance, and highest gross in history.
- April 8 – In Atlanta–Fulton County Stadium, Hank Aaron hits his 715th home run, surpassing Babe Ruth as the all-time home run king.
- April 11 – The Kiryat Shmona massacre takes place in Israel.
- April 24 – Guillaume Affair: exposure of an East German spy Günter Guillaume within the West German government, leading to the resignation of West German Chancellor Willy Brandt.
- April 25 – Carnation Revolution: A left-wing military coup in Portugal restores democracy, ending 41 years of the Estado Novo dictatorship in the country. Portuguese Prime Minister Marcelo Caetano flees to Brazil and is granted political asylum by Brazilian President Ernesto Geisel.

=== May–June ===
- May 4
  - An all-female Japanese team summits Manaslu in Nepal, becoming the first women to climb an 8,000 m (26,000 ft) peak.
  - The Expo '74 world's fair opens in Spokane, Washington.
- May 7 – West German chancellor Willy Brandt, resigns after four years in office.
- May 11 – A violent 7.1 earthquake shakes the Chinese city of Zhaotong causing between 1,600 and 20,000 deaths.
- May 16 – Helmut Schmidt becomes the new Chancellor of West Germany.
- May 17 – The Troubles: The Dublin and Monaghan bombings are carried out by the Ulster Volunteer Force, when they explode four car bombs in counties Dublin and Monaghan in the Republic of Ireland. The attacks kill 33 civilians and wound almost 300, the highest number of casualties in any single event during the conflict.
- May 18
  - 1974 Australian federal election: Gough Whitlam's Labor government is re-elected with a reduced majority, defeating the Liberal/Country Coalition led by Billy Snedden. Whitlam consequently becomes the first Labor Prime Minister to be re-elected in his own right. The Democratic Labor Party meanwhile loses all five of their Senate seats, effectively wiping them out as a political force.
  - Nuclear weapons testing: Under Project Smiling Buddha, India successfully detonates its first nuclear weapon, becoming the 6th nation to do so.
- June 1 - In an informal article in a medical journal, Henry Heimlich introduced the concept of abdominal thrusts, commonly known as the Heimlich maneuver, to treat victims of choking.
- June 13 – The 1974 FIFA World Cup Association football tournament began in West Germany.
- June 17 – A bomb explodes in Westminster Hall, the oldest part of the British Houses of Parliament. The hall's annex, housing offices, and a canteen are destroyed by the bombing, attributed by police to the Provisional wing of the Irish Republican Army.
- June 27 – The head of the Chilean Military Junta, Army General Augusto Pinochet, assumes the office of "Supreme Chief of the Nation". On December 17, via a Supreme Decree amendment, he will be formally designated President of Chile.
- June 29 – Isabel Perón is sworn in as the first female President of Argentina, replacing her sick husband Juan Perón, who dies 2 days later.

=== July–August ===
- July 7 – West Germany beats the Netherlands 2–1 to win the 1974 FIFA World Cup. The West German football team is awarded the new FIFA World Cup Trophy.
- July 15 – The Greek military junta sponsors a coup d'état in Cyprus, replacing President Makarios III with Nikos Sampson. On that same day, reporter Christine Chubbuck commits suicide for the first-time-ever on live television.
- July 19 – Railcar explosion in Decatur, Illinois. A tanker car collides with a Norfolk & Western boxcar. Seven people are killed, 349 are injured and $18 million in property damage.
- July 20 – The Turkish invasion of Cyprus occurs.
- July 23 – The Greek military junta is replaced by a civilian government, the metapolitefsi.
- August 4 – A bomb explodes in a train between Italy and West Germany, killing twelve and wounding 48.
- Watergate scandal:
  - August 8 – U.S. President Richard Nixon announces his resignation on August 8, effective at noon on August 9.
  - August 9 – Vice President Gerald Ford becomes the 38th president of the United States upon Nixon's resignation.
- August 14
  - Turkey invades Cyprus for the second time, occupying 37% of the island's territory.
  - Greece withdraws its forces from NATO's military command structure, as a result of the Turkish invasion of Cyprus.
- August 30
  - An express train bound for Germany from Belgrade derails in Zagreb, Yugoslavia (now Croatia), killing more than 150 passengers.
  - The Mitsubishi Heavy Industries building in Tokyo is bombed by radical far-left terrorists, killing 8 and wounding more than 376.

=== September–October ===
- September 8
  - TWA Flight 841 crashes into the Ionian Sea 18 minutes after takeoff from Athens on an Israel–New York flight after a bomb explodes in the cargo hold, and kills 88 people.
  - President Gerald Ford signs Proclamation 4311, granting a full and unconditional pardon to Richard Nixon, his predecessor.
- September 10 – The Portuguese military junta grants independence to Guinea-Bissau.
- September 12
  - Ethiopian Revolution: Emperor Haile Selassie of Ethiopia is deposed by the Derg, bringing an end to the Solomonic dynasty's rule since 1270. The Ethiopian Civil War begins.
  - African Youth Amílcar Cabral is founded in Guinea-Bissau.
- September 13 – Japanese Red Army members seize the French Embassy in The Hague, Netherlands.
- September 20 – The Kootenai War is declared, and 10-cent tolls are charged on U.S. Highway 95.
- October 11 – The UK Labour government of Harold Wilson wins the second general election of the year, forming a three-seat majority. Wilson, who has led the party for a total of 11 years, has now won four of the five general elections he has contested.
- October 26 – Fuerzas Armadas de Liberación Nacional Puertorriqueña (FALN) sets off 5 bombs in Manhattan, with their largest bomb set off in the Financial District.

=== November–December ===
- November 1 – The World Tourism Organization (WTO) is established.
- November 5 – The Democratic Party makes big gains nationwide in House, Senate, and Gubernatorial elections.
- November 13 – Ronald Joseph DeFeo Jr. shoots and kills all six of his family members while they sleep in their beds inside the family's Amityville, New York, home.
- November 16 – Arecibo message: The radio telescope at the Arecibo Observatory on Puerto Rico sends an interstellar radio message towards Messier 13, the Great Globular Cluster in Hercules. The message will reach its destination around the year 27,000.
- November 17 – The 1974 Greek legislative election, the first election since the fall of the Greek junta of 1967–1974, is held and the newly formed New Democracy party wins 220 of 300 seats in the Hellenic Parliament.
- November 18 – The International Energy Agency is founded.
- November 20 – Lufthansa Flight 540 crashes in Nairobi, Kenya, due to a mechanical failure, killing 59 of its 157 occupants.
- November 21 – Birmingham pub bombings: In Birmingham, England, two pubs are bombed, killing 21 people in an attack widely believed at the time to be linked to the Provisional Irish Republican Army. The Birmingham Six are later sentenced to life in prison for this, but their convictions are quashed after a lengthy campaign.
- November 22 – The United Nations General Assembly grants the Palestine Liberation Organization observer status.
- November 24 – A skeleton from the hominid species Australopithecus afarensis is discovered and named Lucy.
- November 26 – Anneline Kriel is crowned as Miss World 1974, the second South African to hold the title after Penny Coelen in 1958, when Helen Morgan resigns four days after winning the 24th Miss World pageant.
- December 1 – Two Boeing 727s, TWA Flight 514 and Northwest Orient Airlines Flight 6231, crash on the same day in the Eastern United States resulting in a combined deaths of 95 people.
- December 8 – 1974 Greek republic referendum: Greeks vote in a 2 to 1 margin to reject the monarchy, solidifying the country's republican form of government.
- December 9 – The Paris summit, reuniting the European Communities' heads of state and government, commences.
- December 13 – Malta becomes a republic.
- December 17 – The World Intellectual Property Organization (WIPO) becomes a specialized agency of the United Nations.
- December 24–25 – Darwin, Australia is almost completely destroyed by Cyclone Tracy.

=== Date unknown ===
- Rubik's Cube puzzle is invented by Hungarian architecture professor Ernő Rubik.
- Skittles was created and released by a British company in the United Kingdom.
- The first Standing Conference of Eastern, Central, and Southern African Library and Information Associations (SCECSAL) occurred in Dar es Salaam.

== Births ==
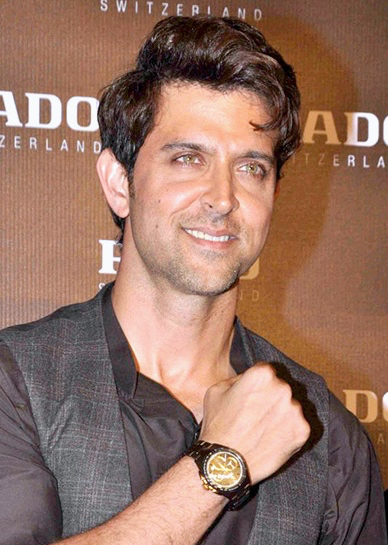
Hrithik Roshan

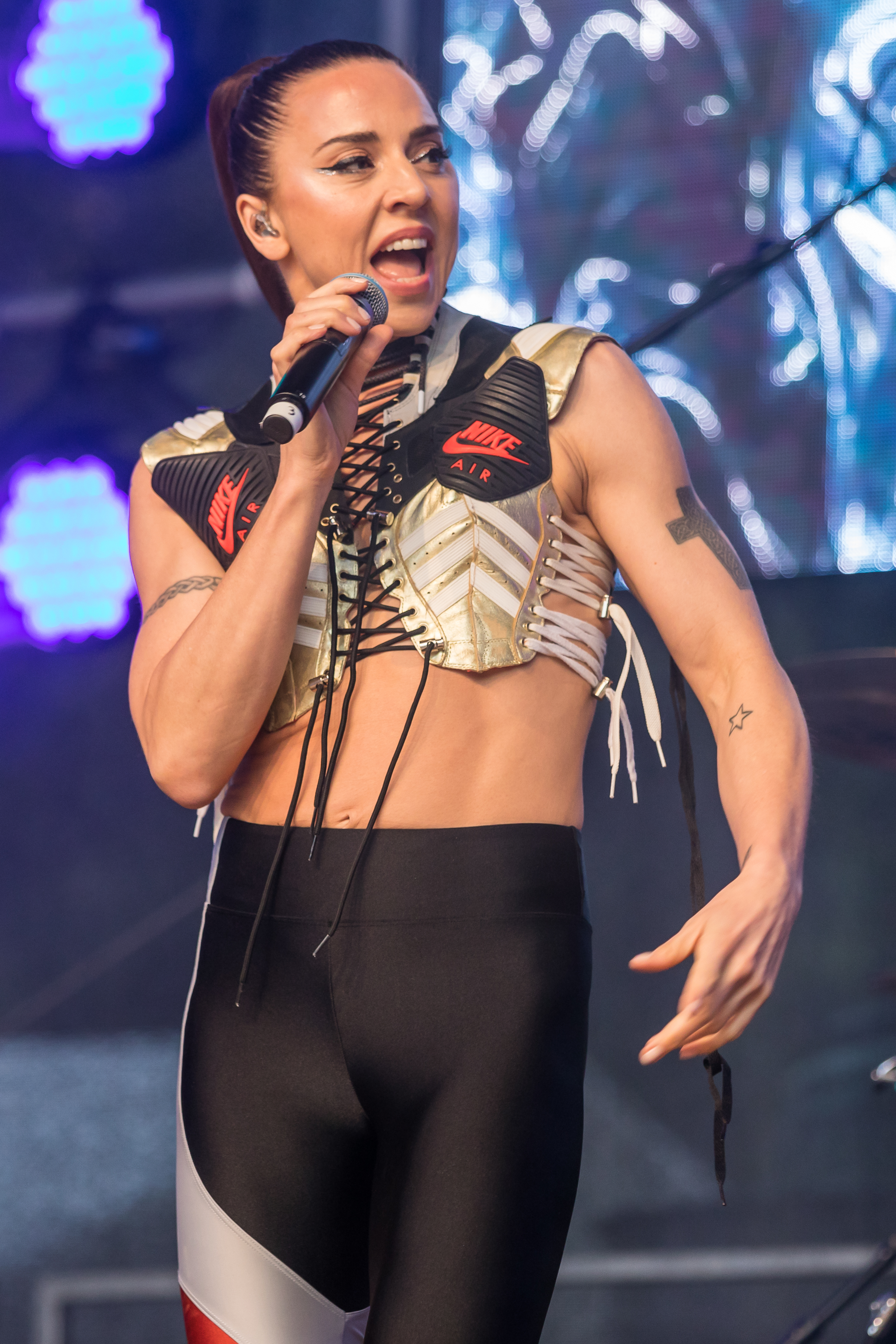
Melanie C

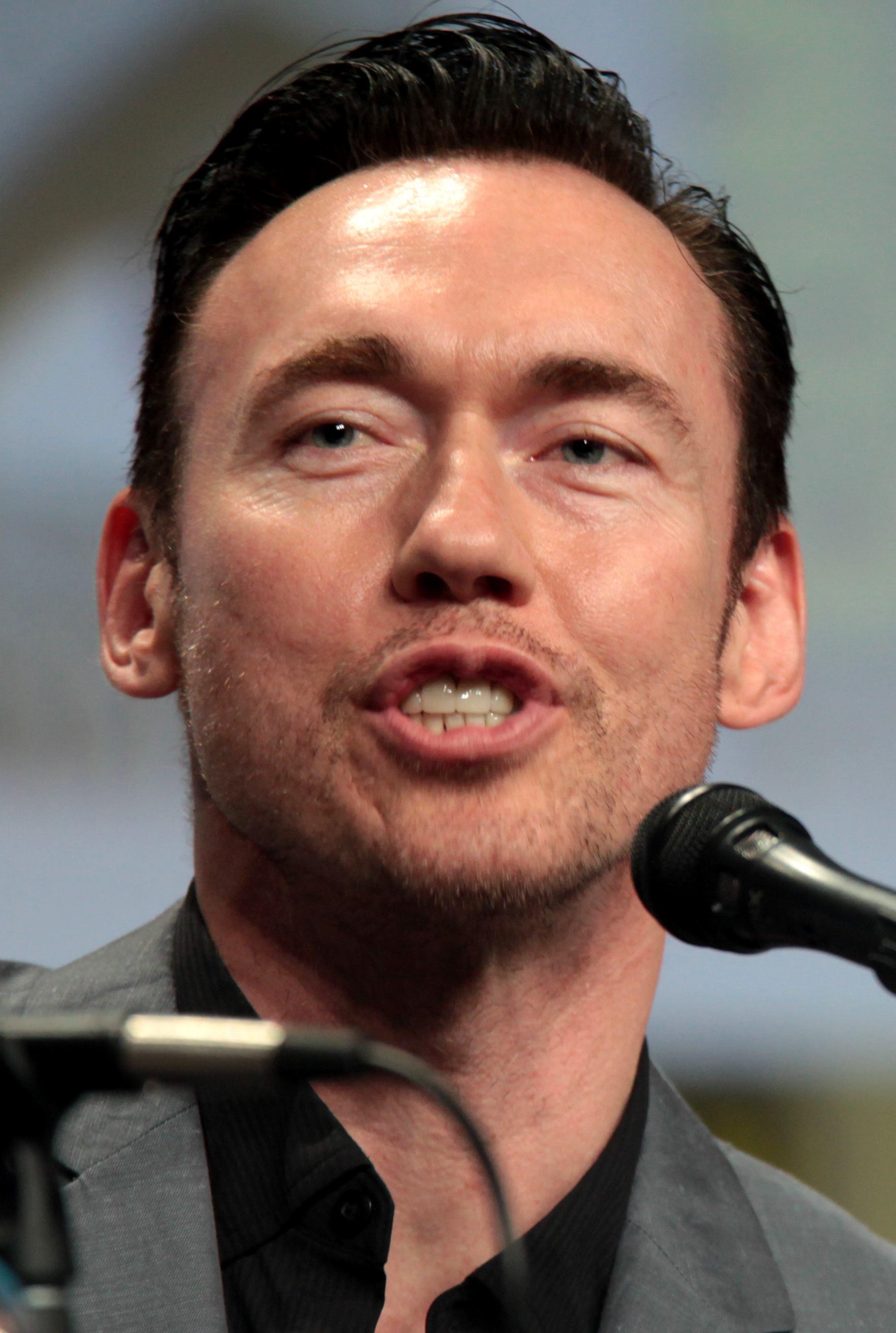
Kevin Durand

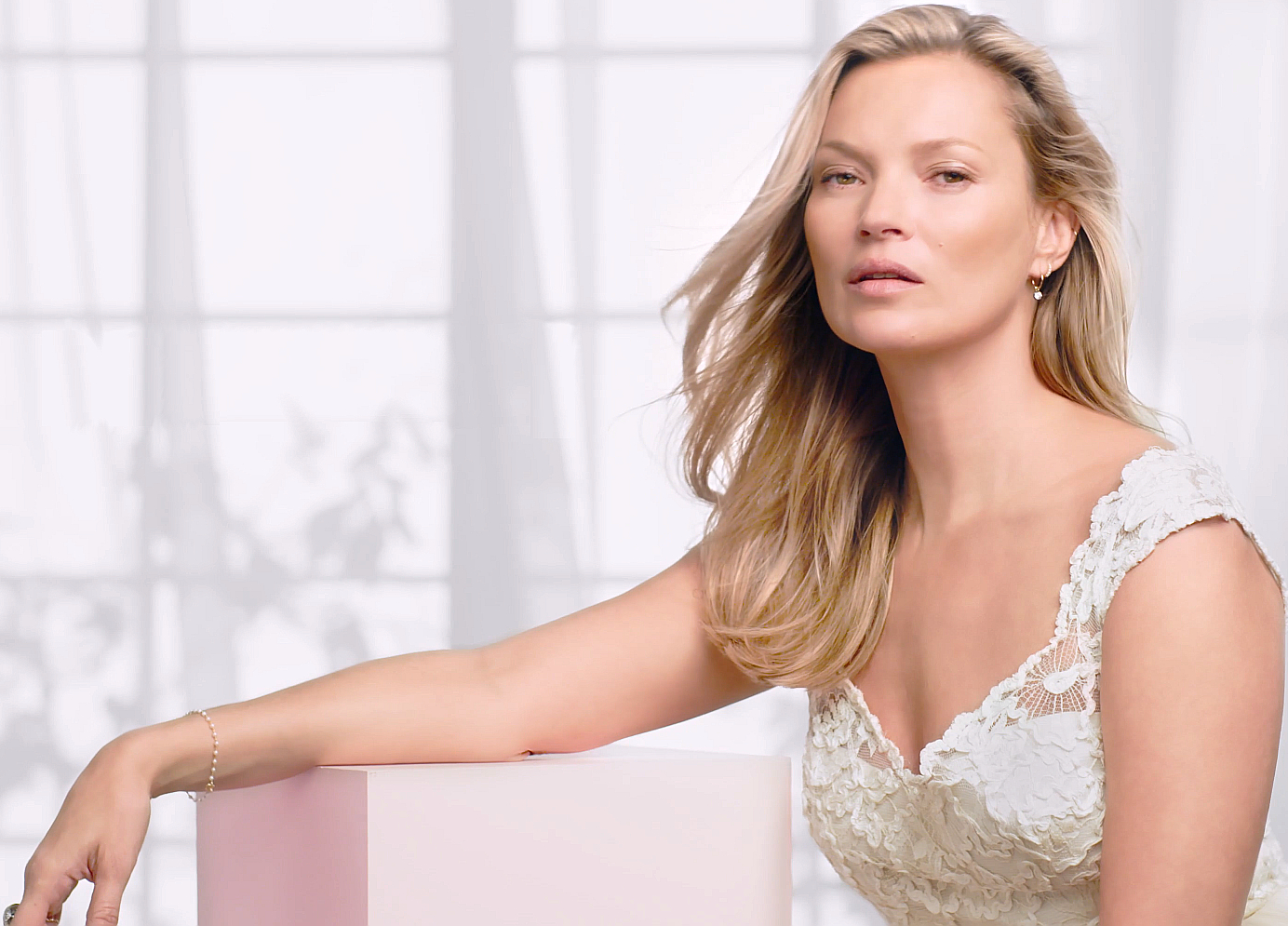
Kate Moss

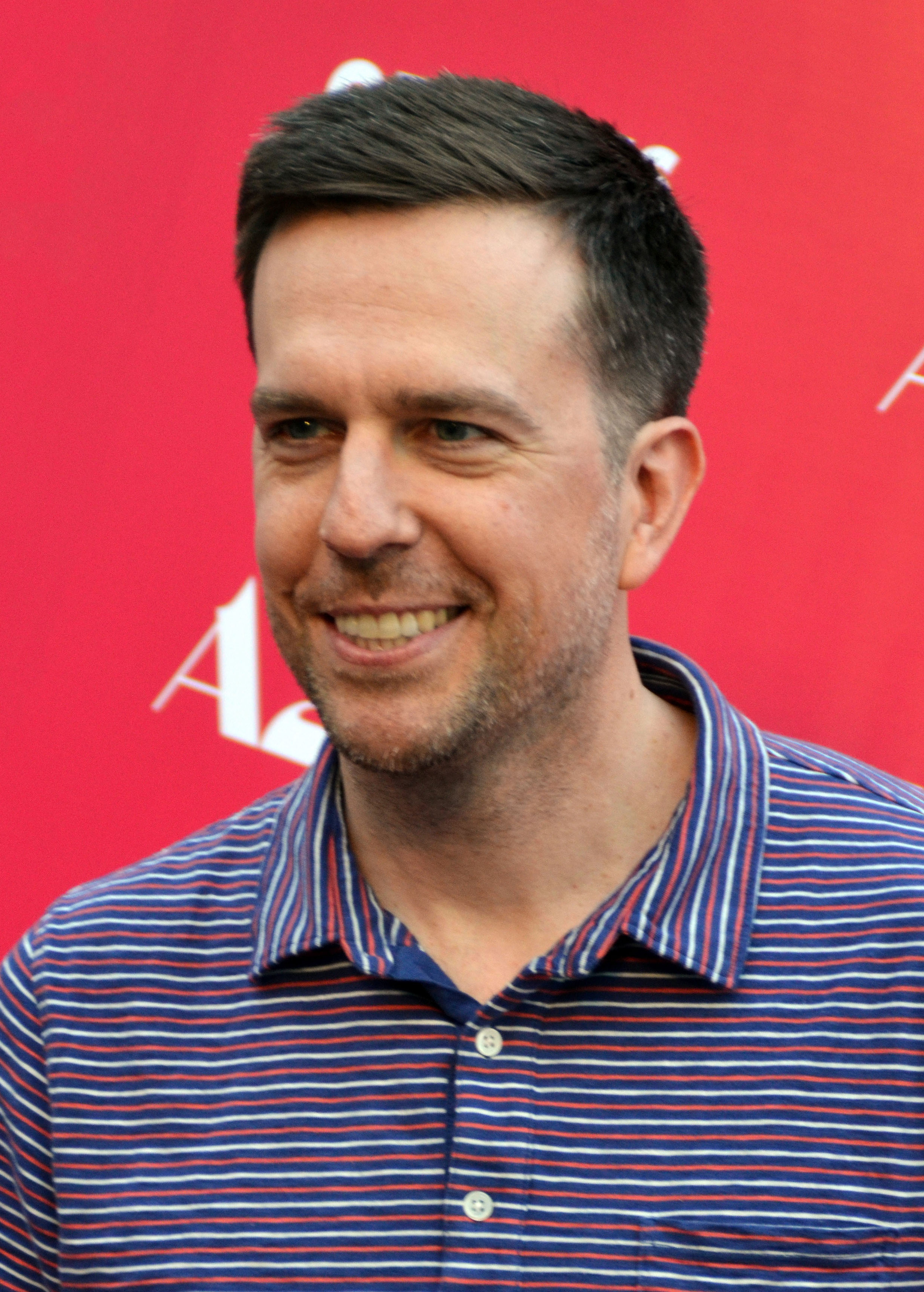
Ed Helms

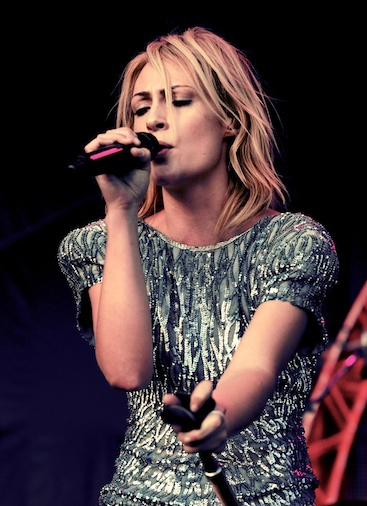
Emily Haines

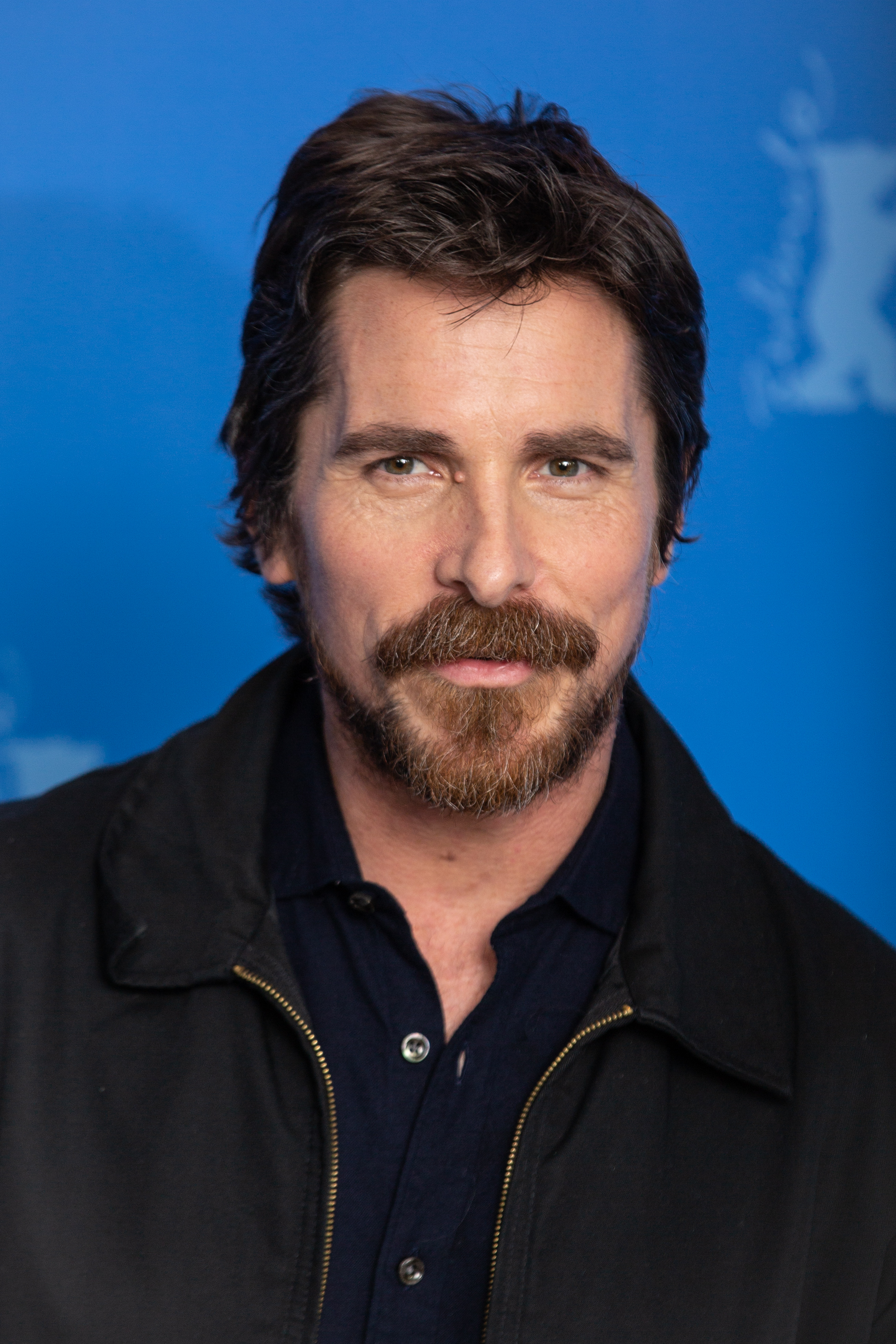
Christian Bale

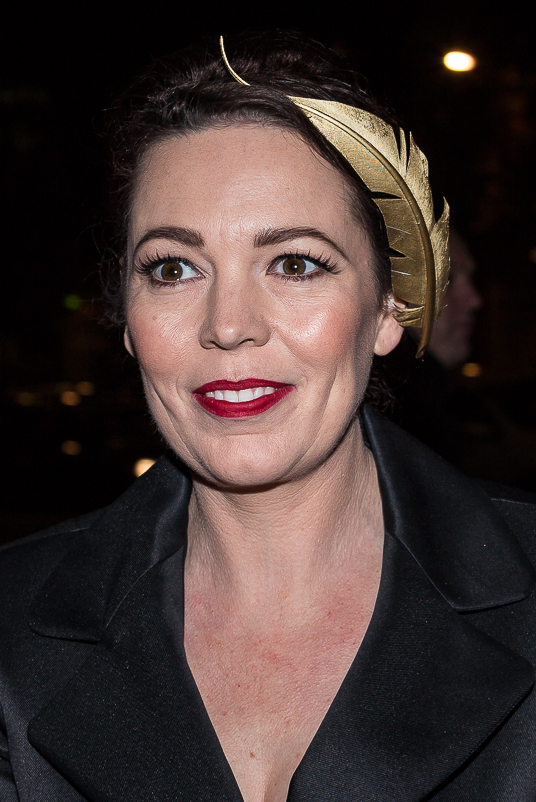
Olivia Colman

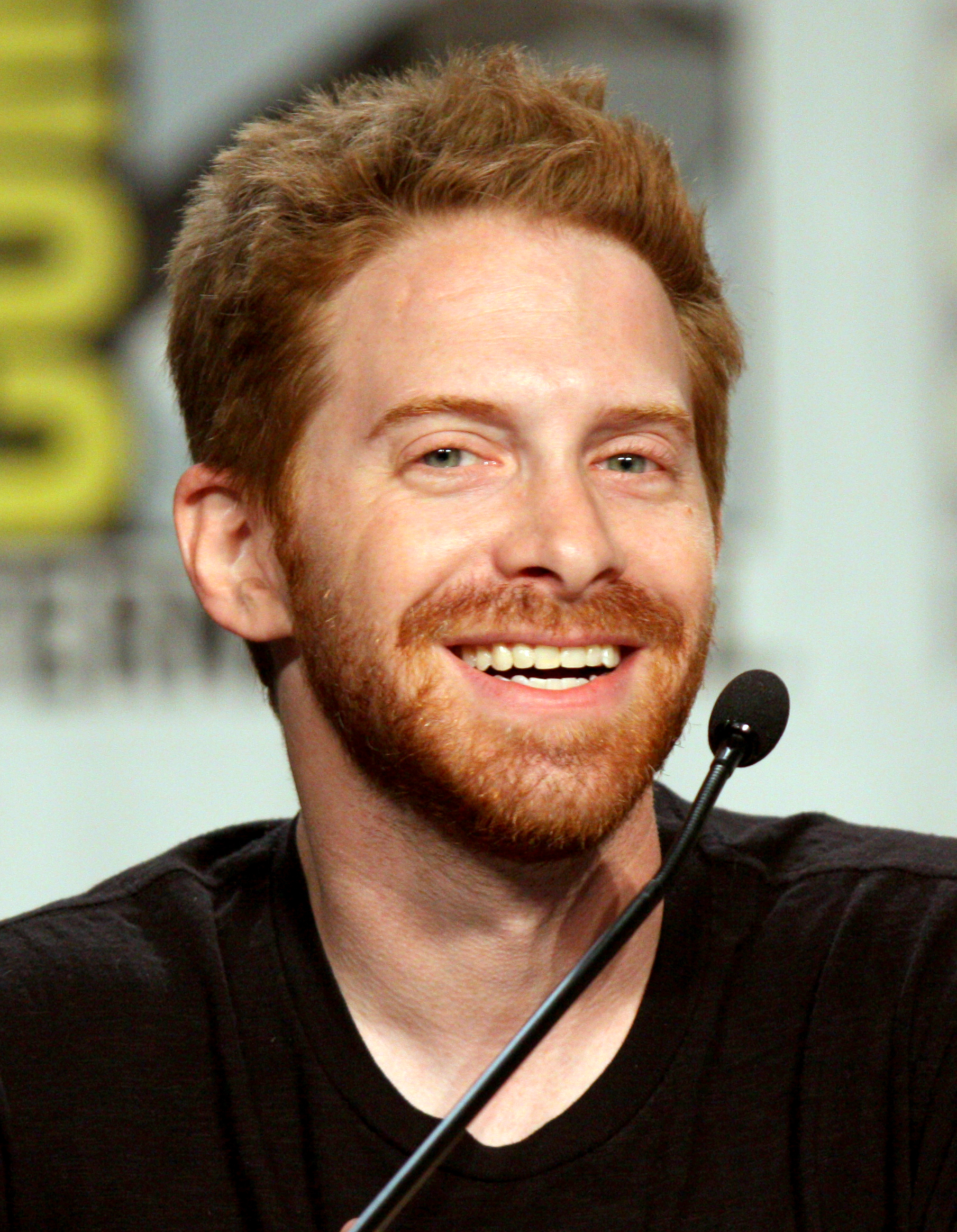
Seth Green

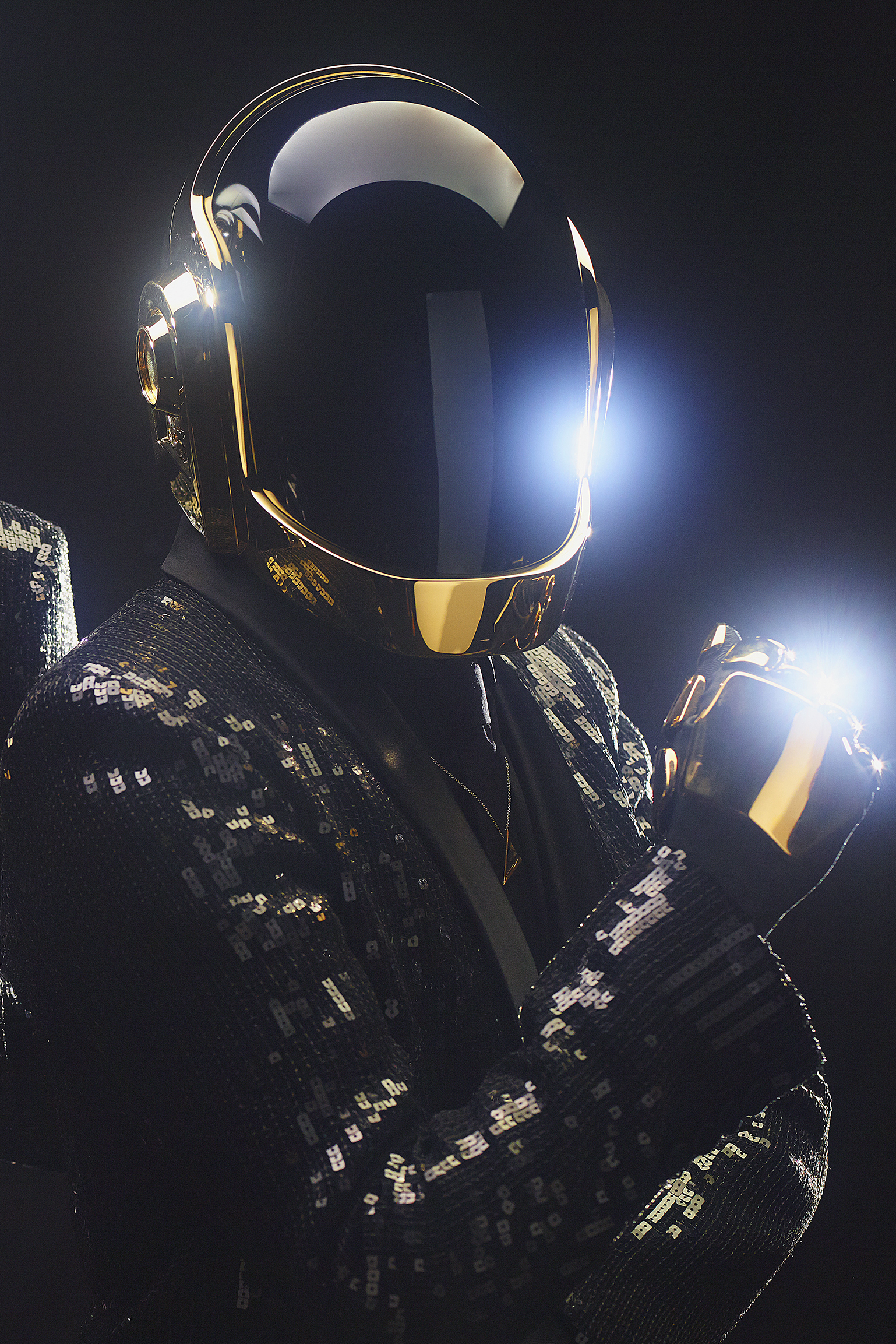
Guy-Manuel de Homem-Christo

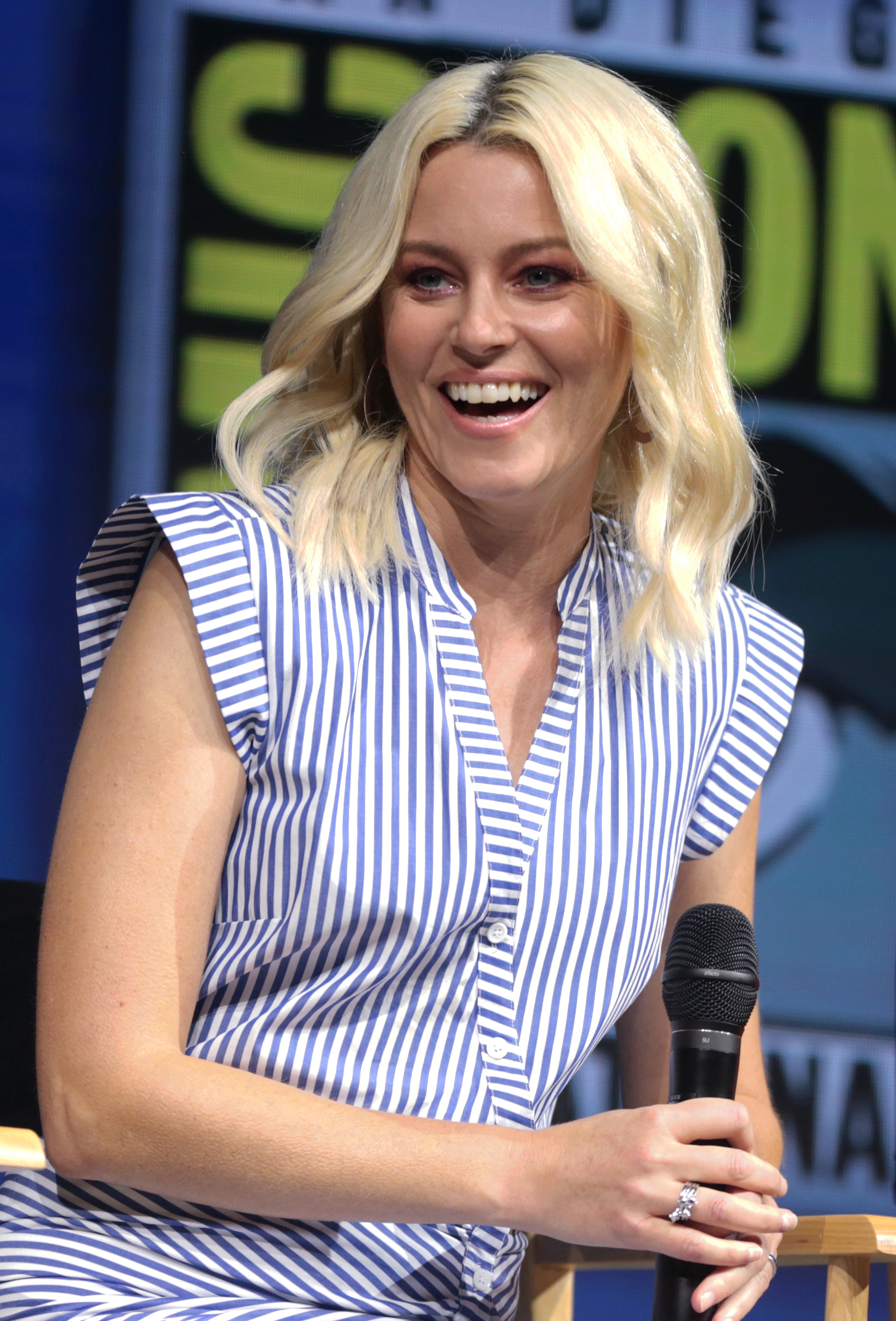
Elizabeth Banks

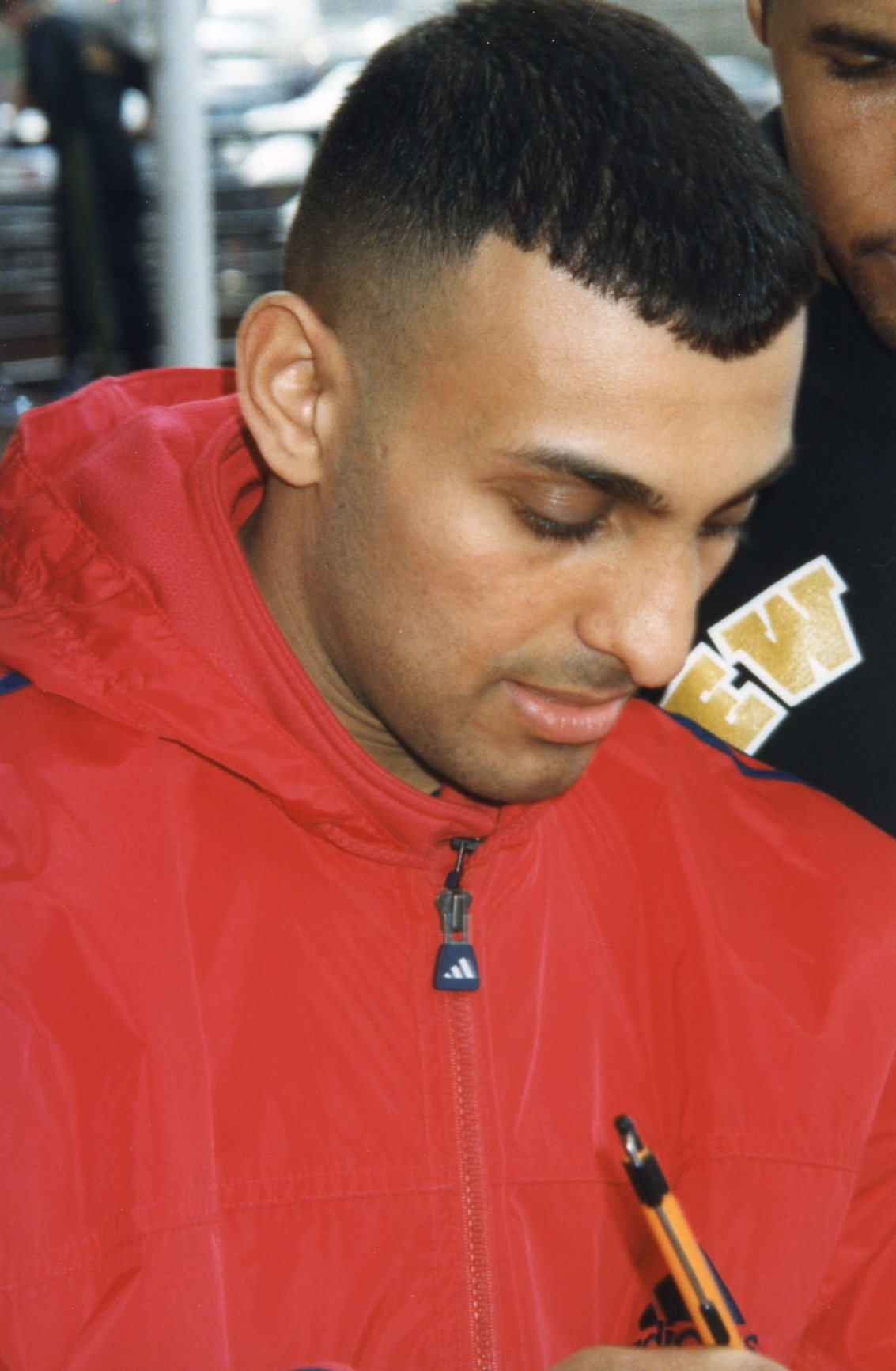
Naseem Hamed

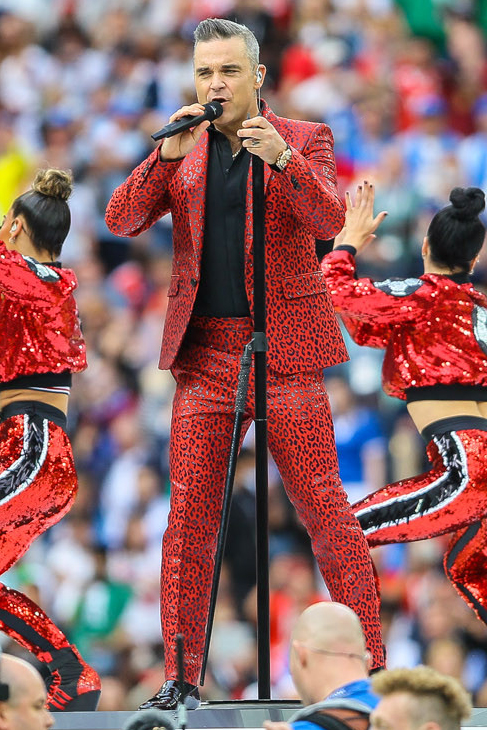
Robbie Williams

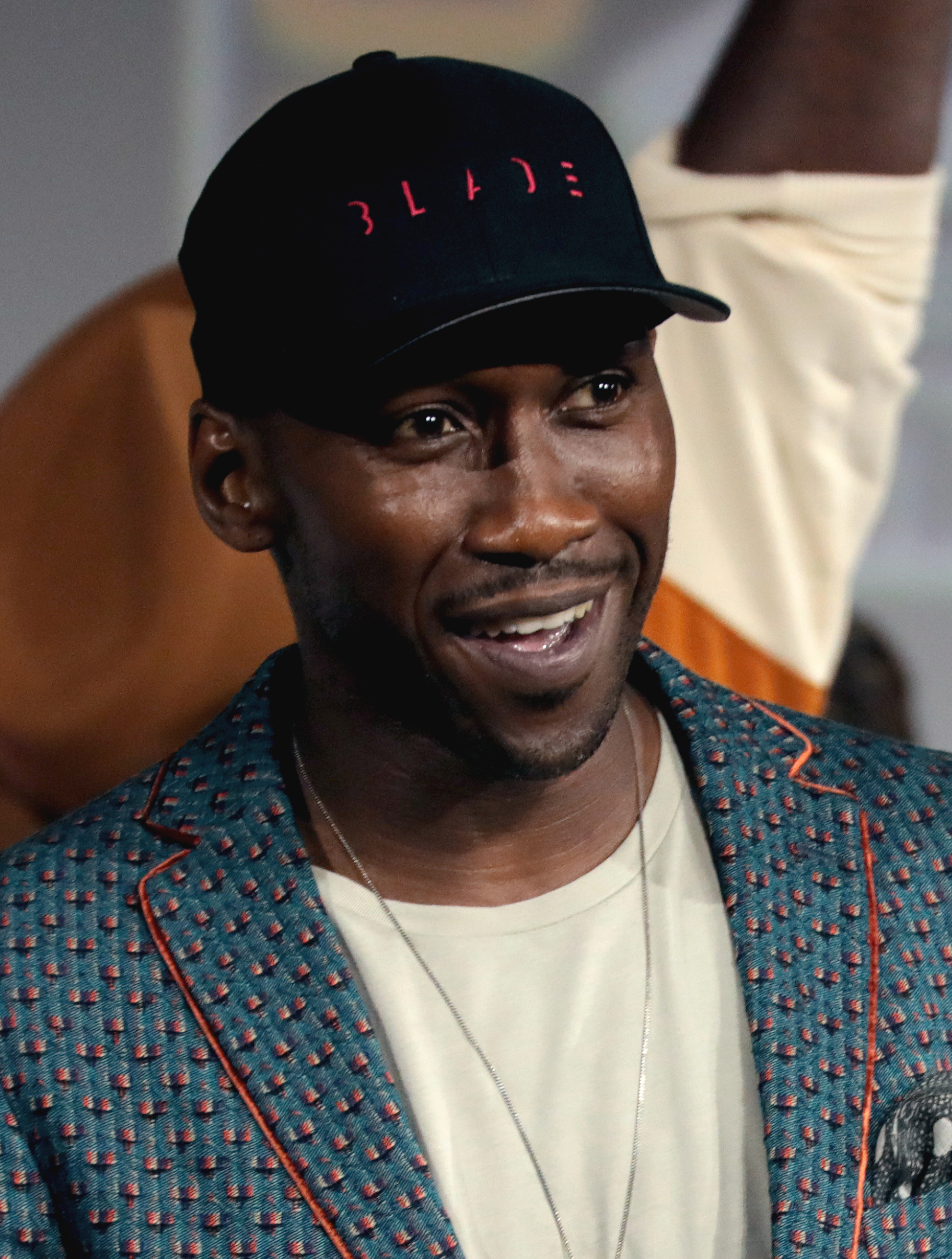
Mahershala Ali

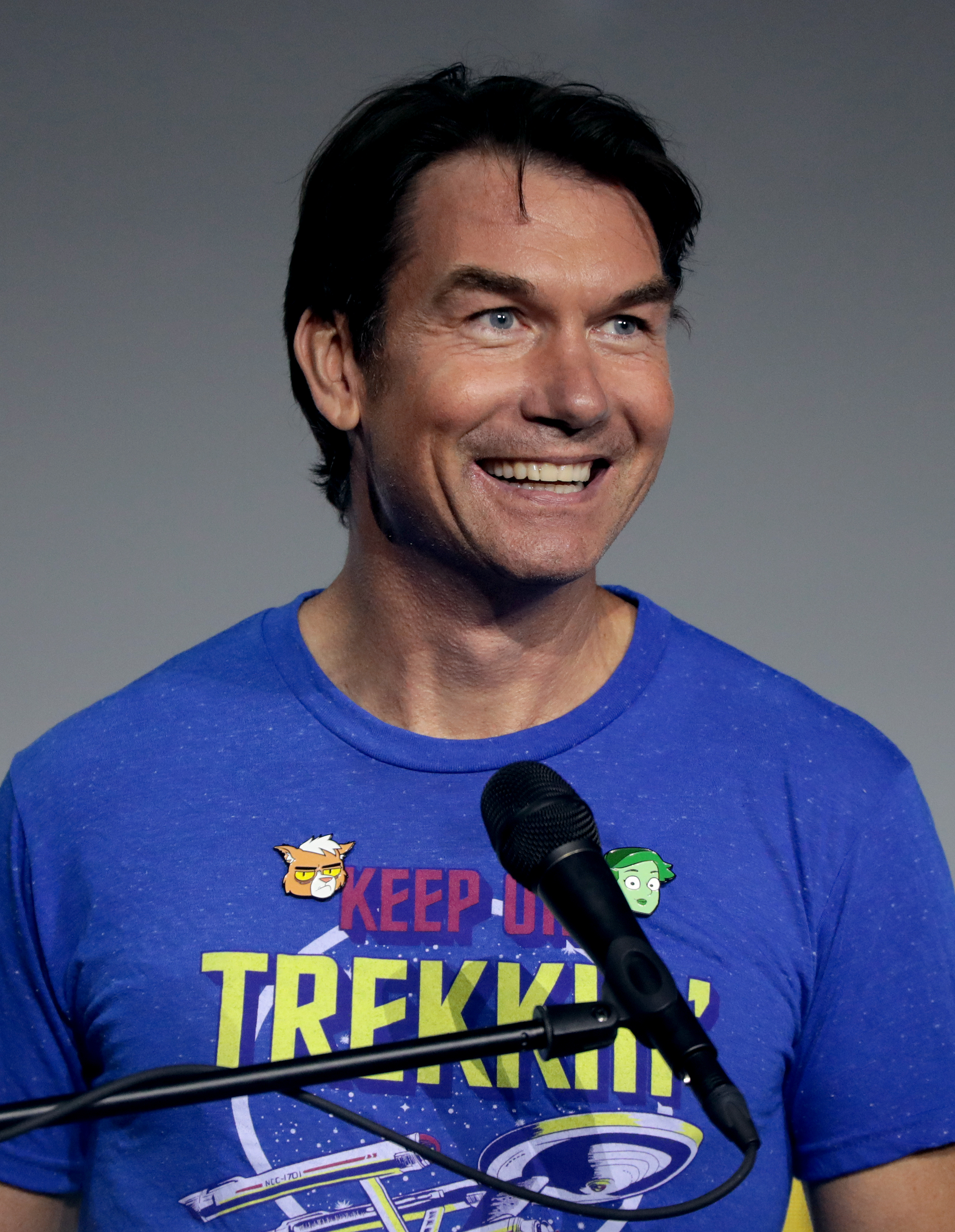
Jerry O'Connell

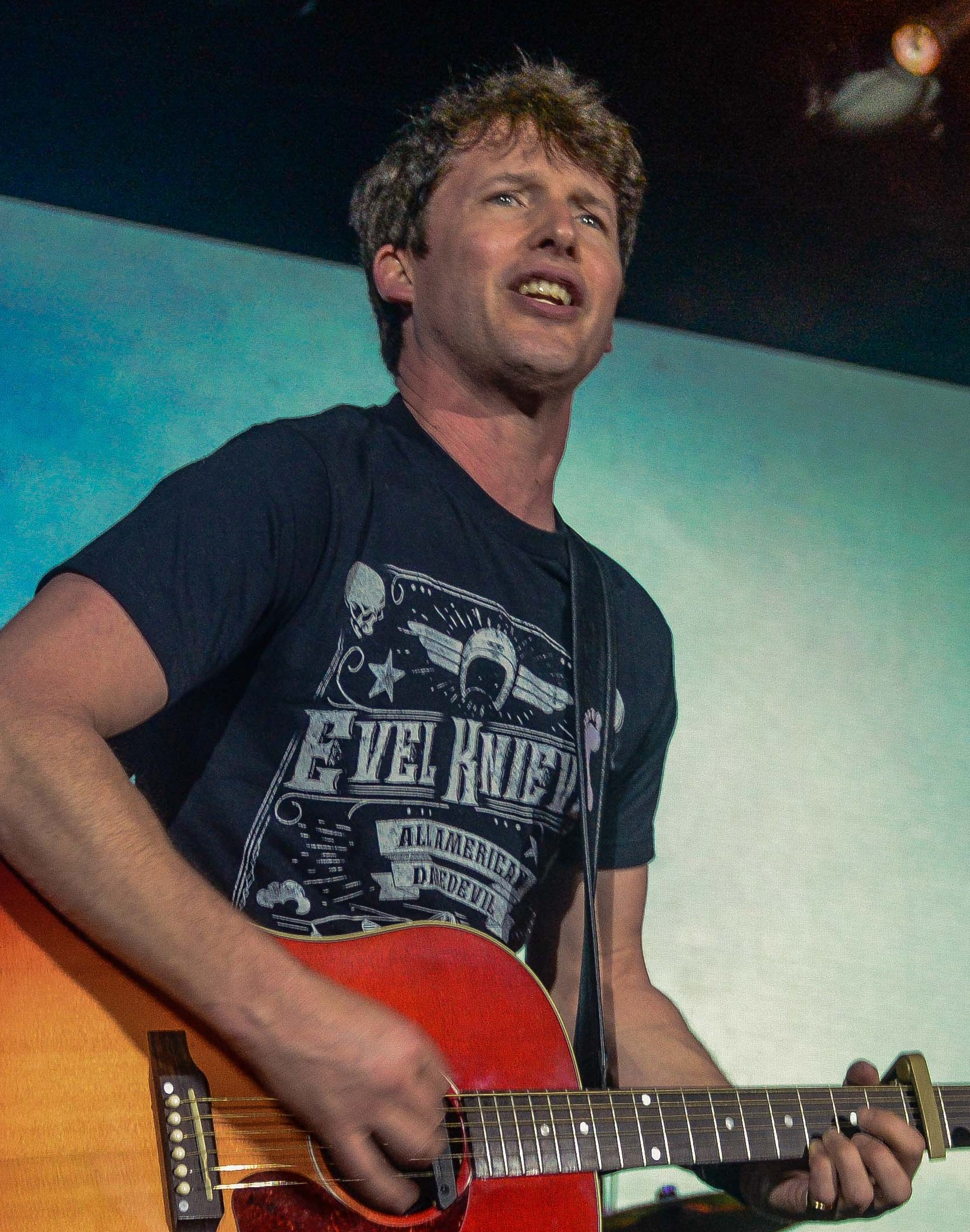
James Blunt

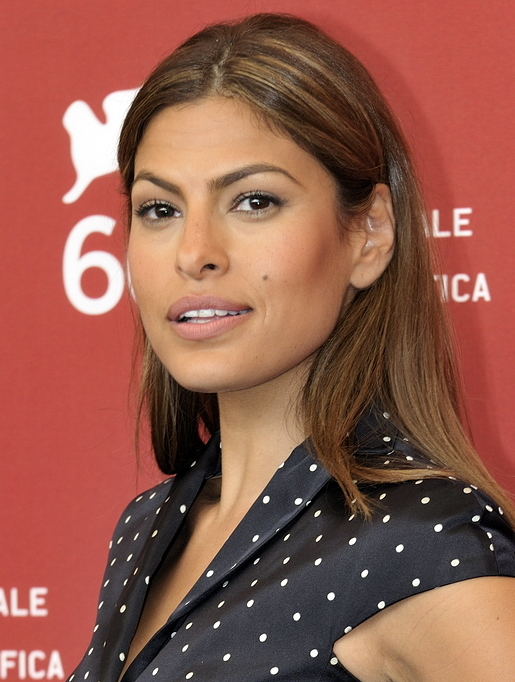
Eva Mendes

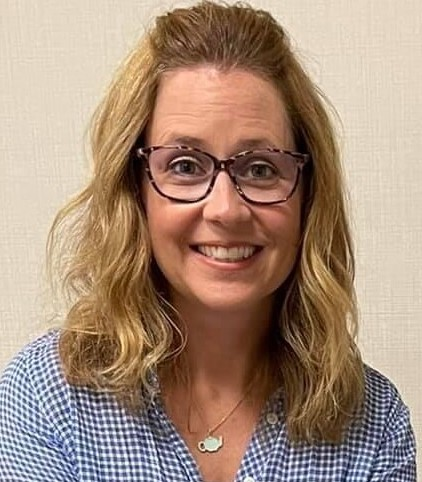
Jenna Fischer

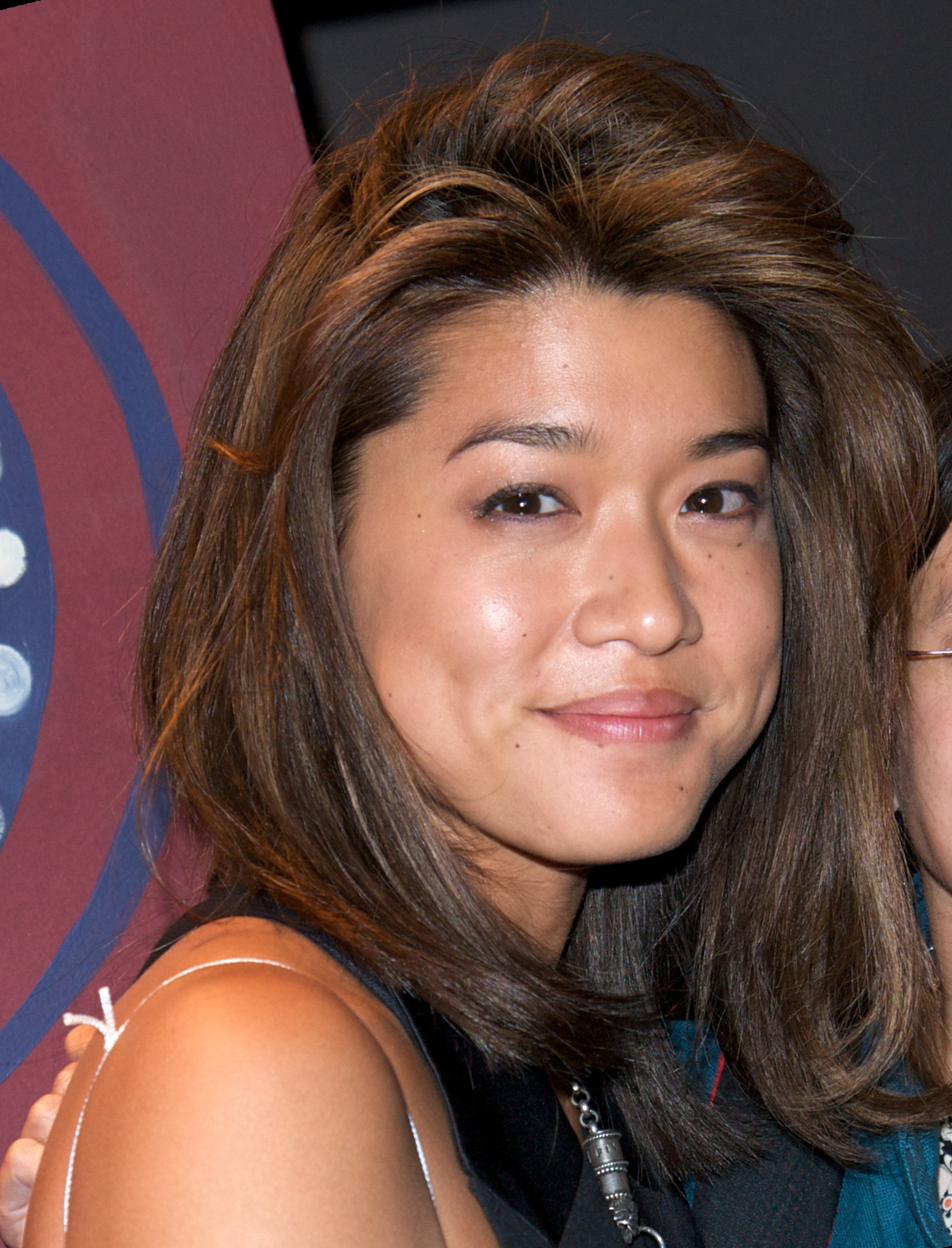
Grace Park

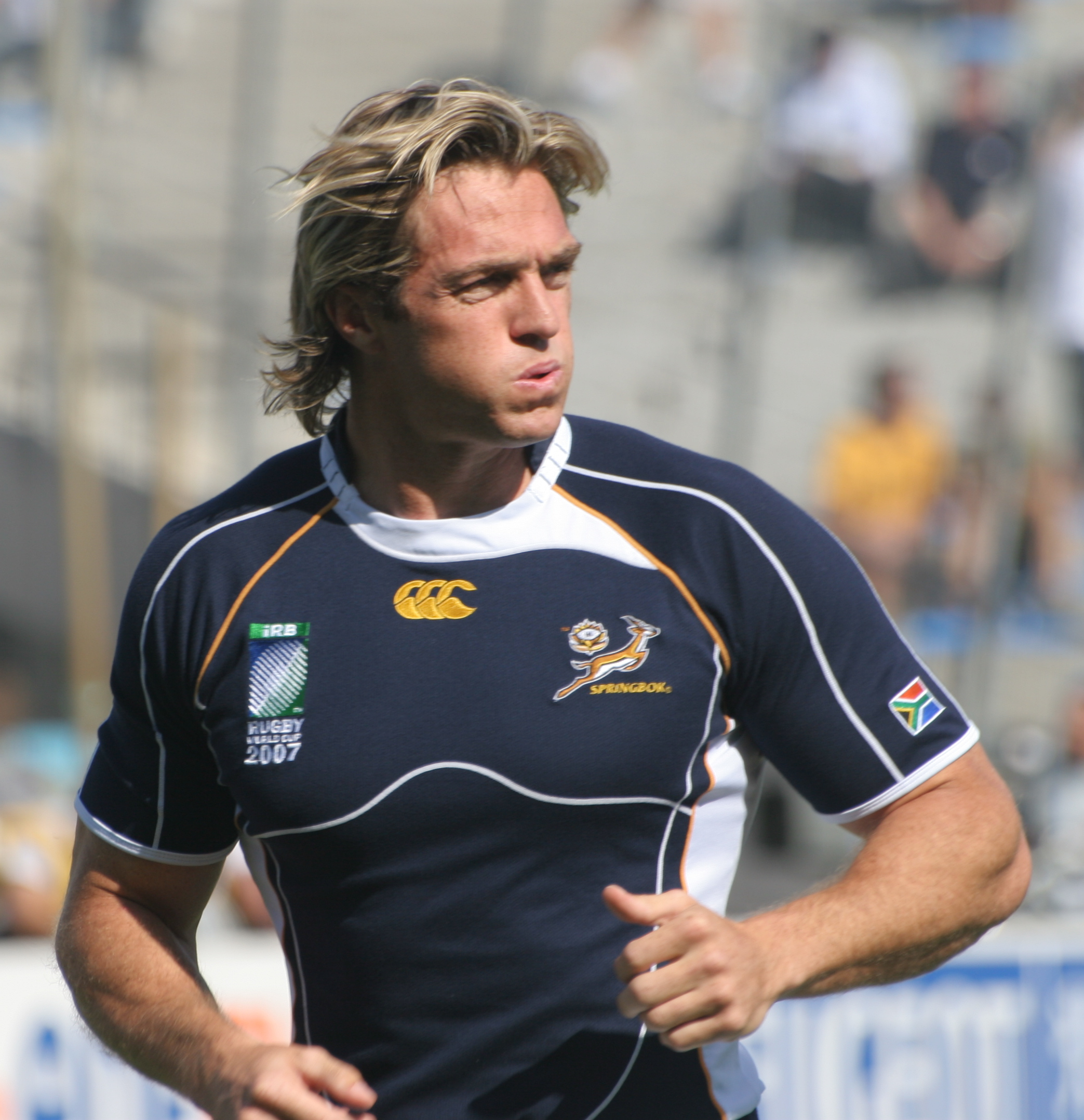
Percy Montgomery

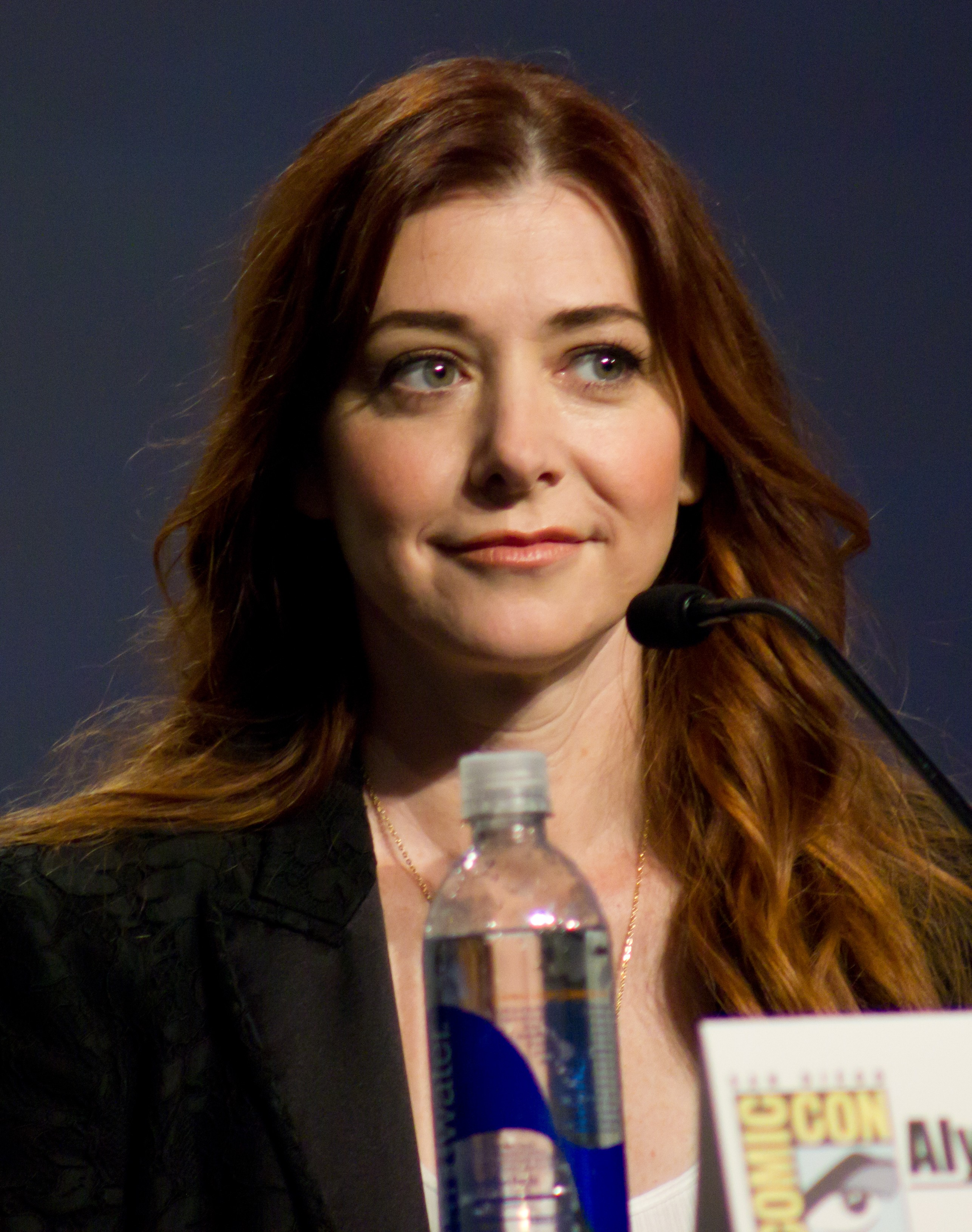
Alyson Hannigan

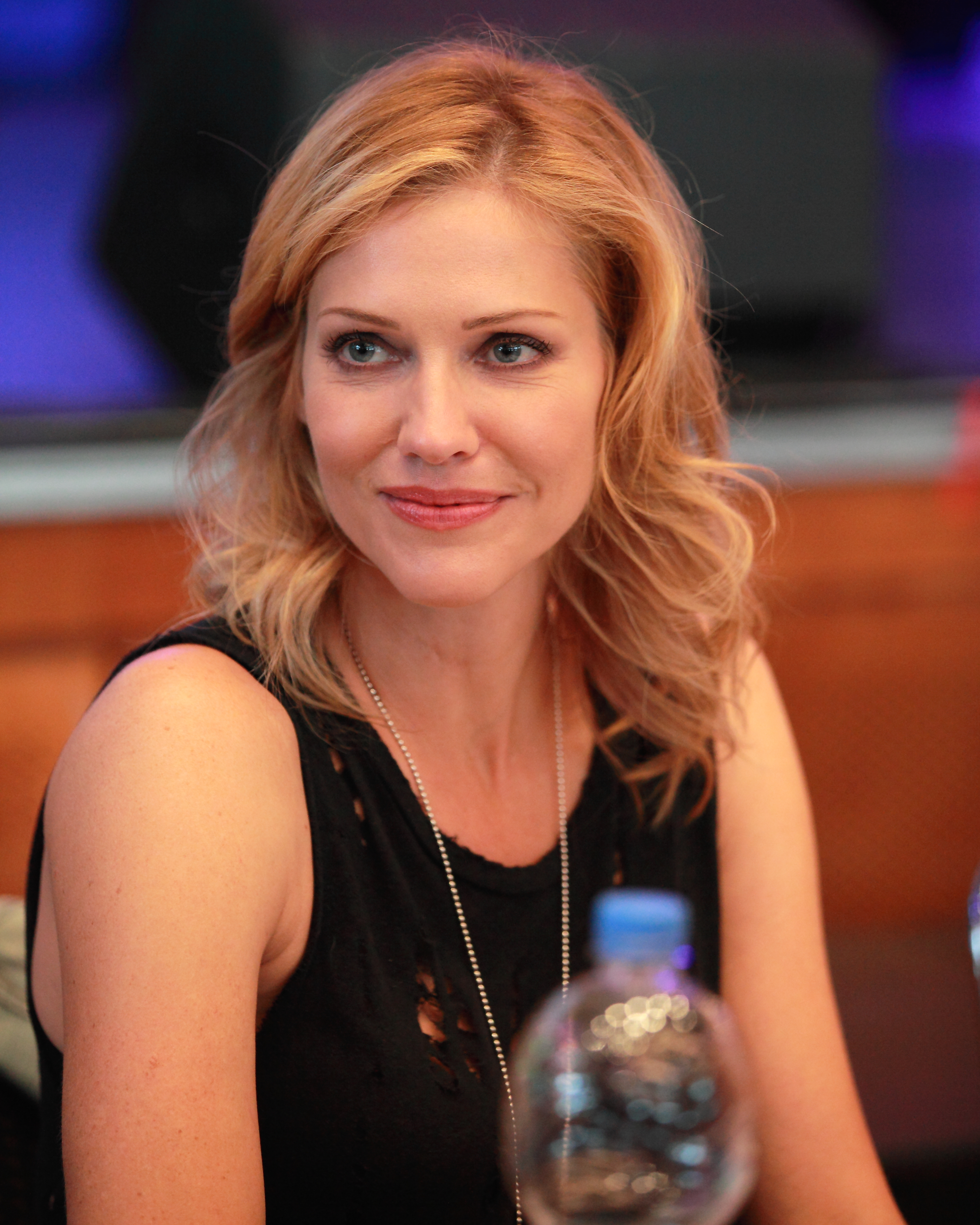
Tricia Helfer

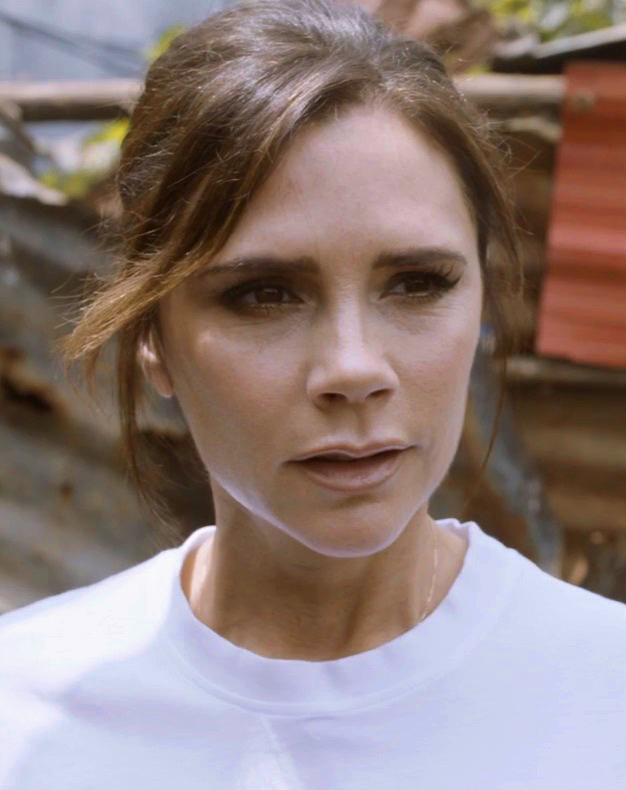
Victoria Beckham

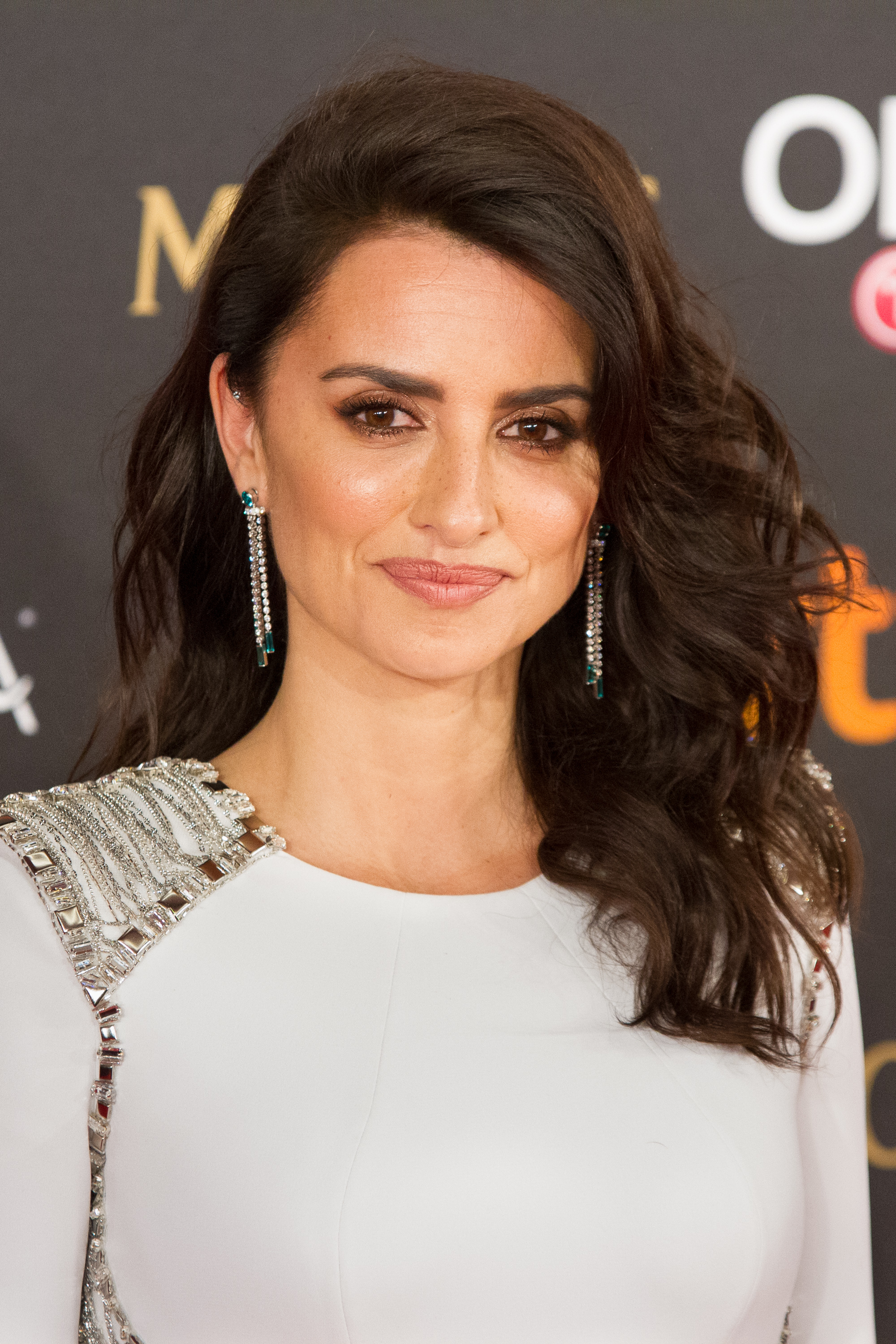
Penélope Cruz

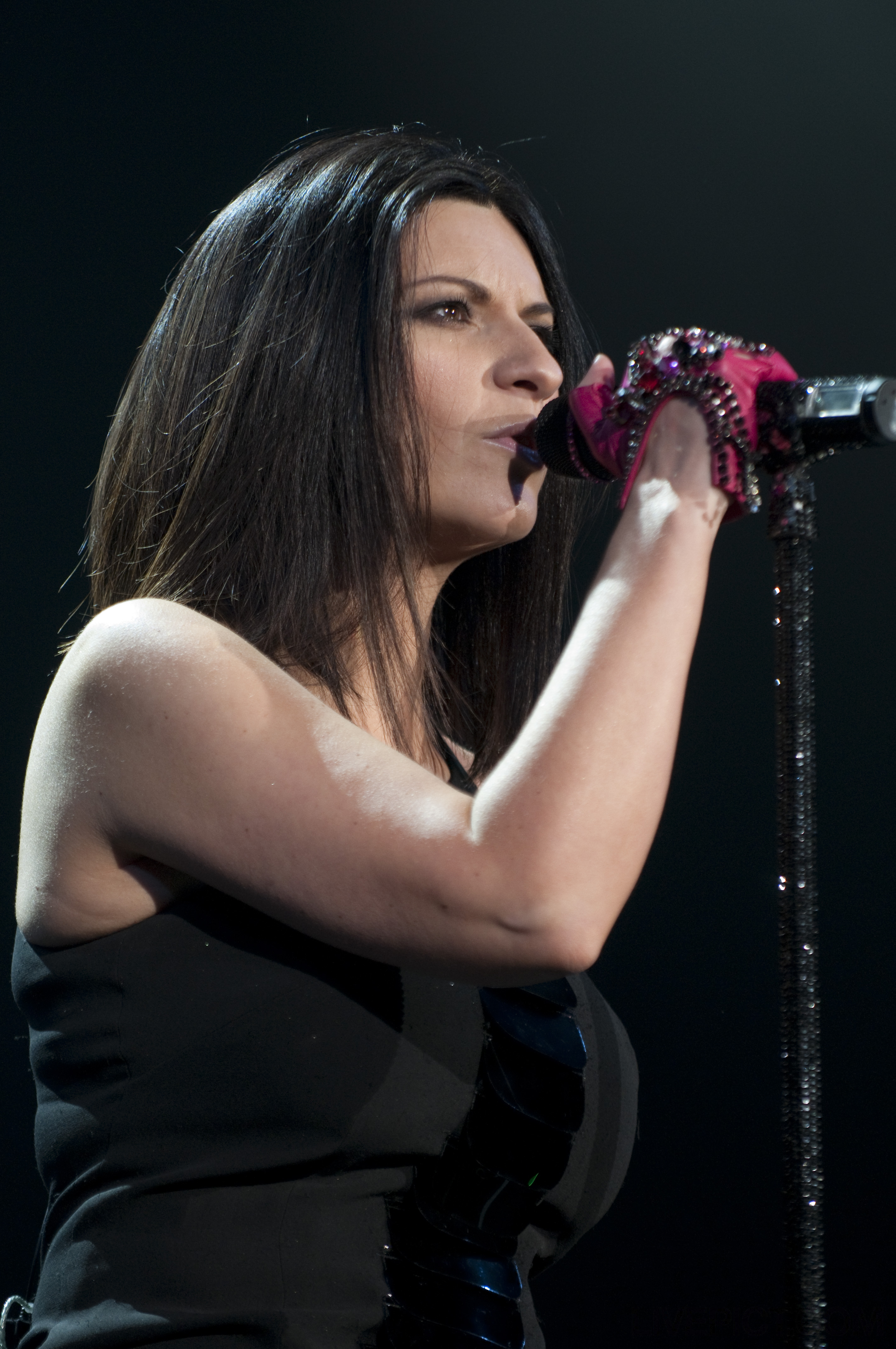
Laura Pausini

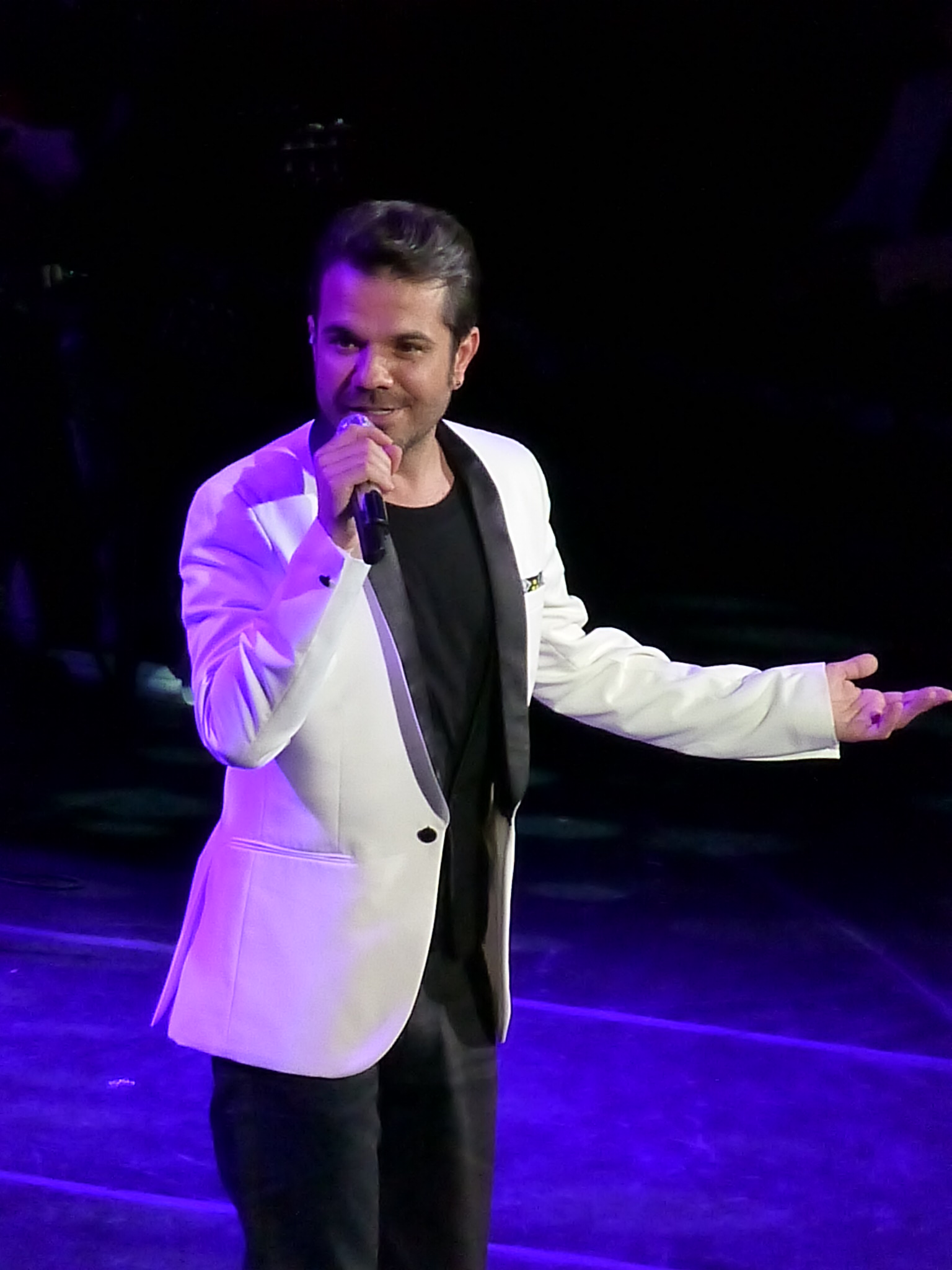
Kenan Doğulu

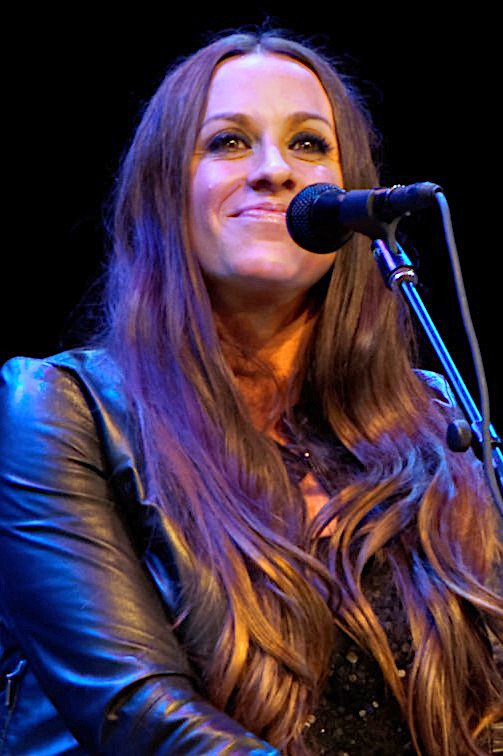
Alanis Morissette

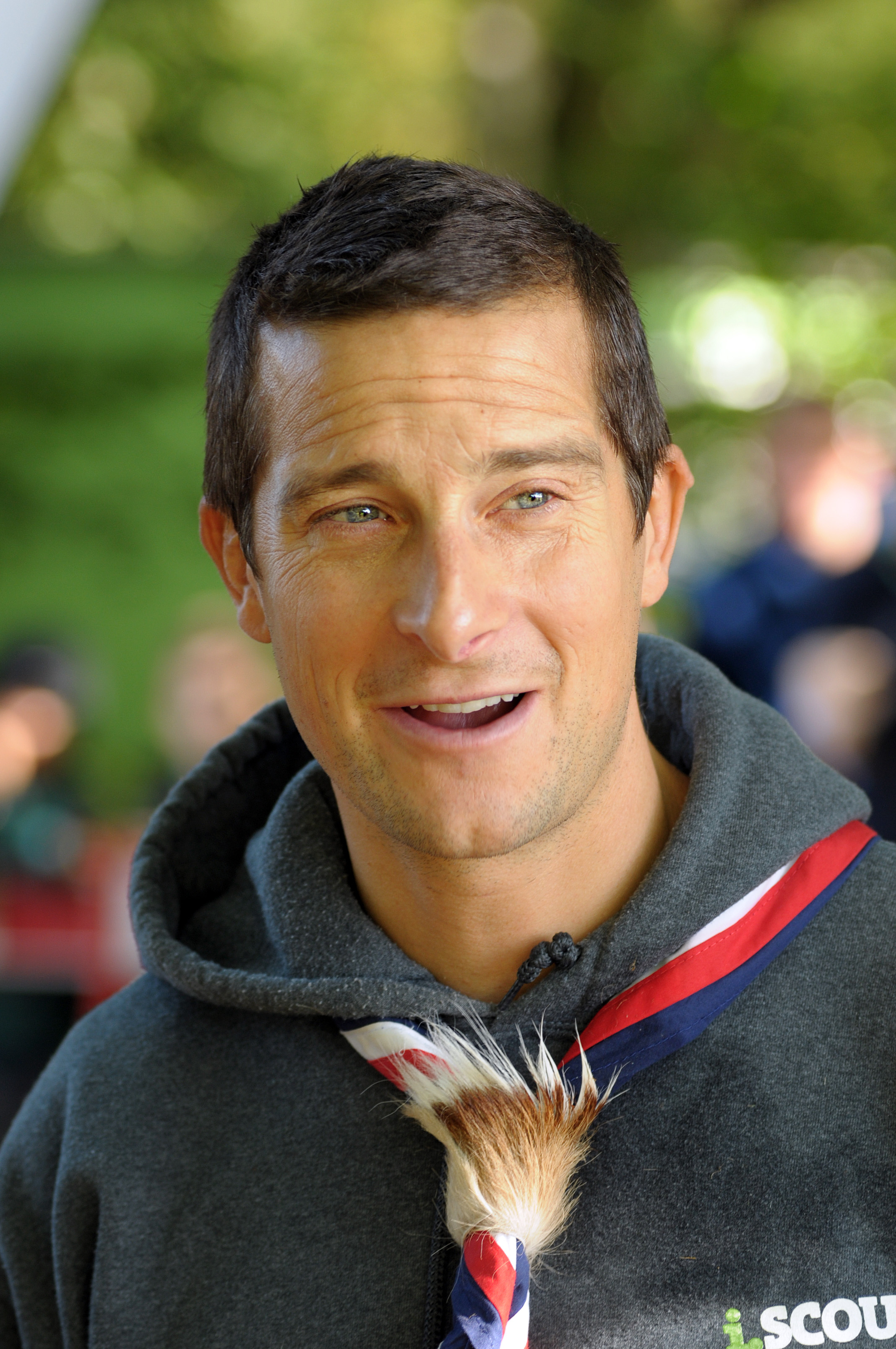
Bear Grylls

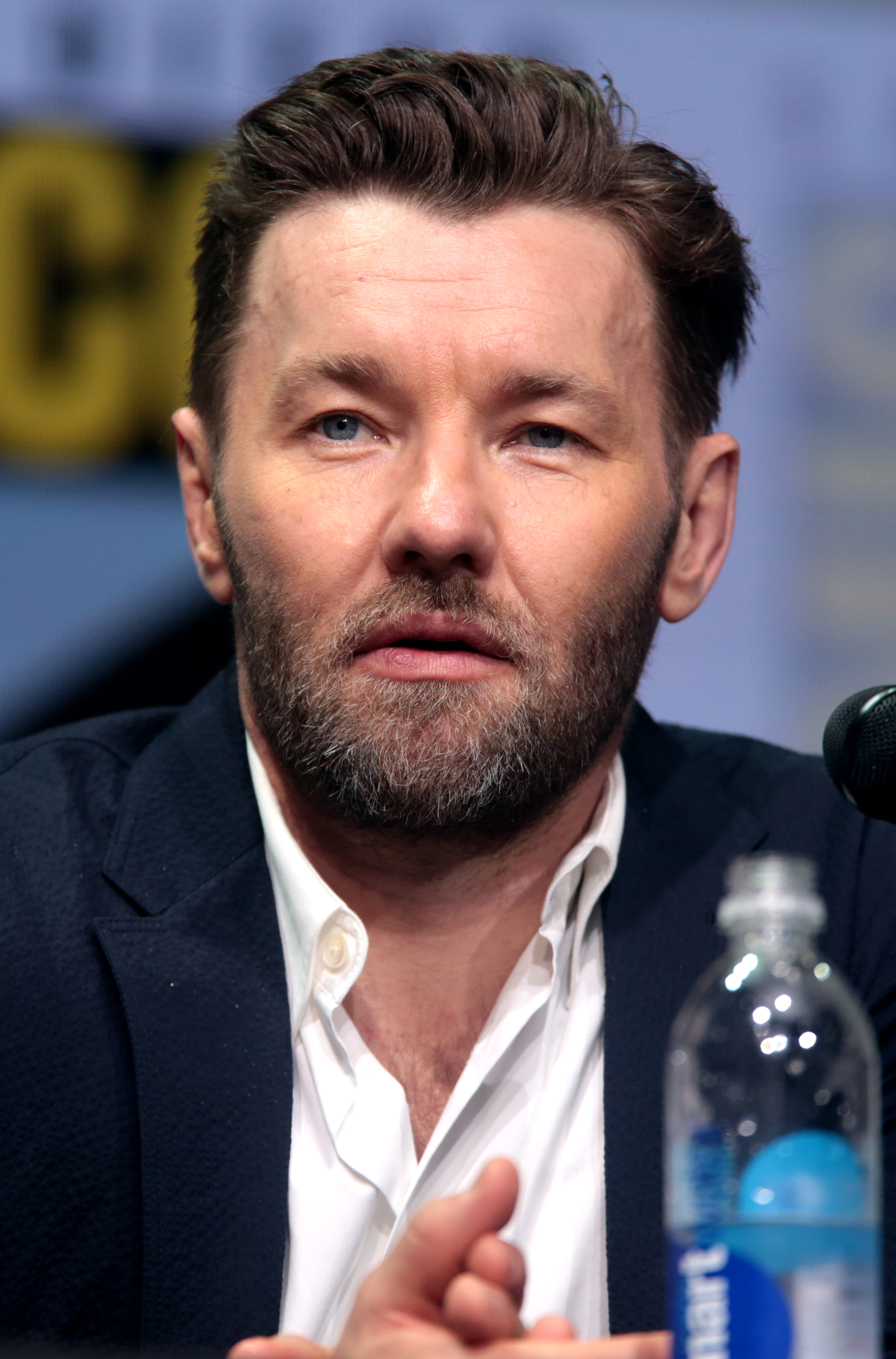
Joel Edgerton

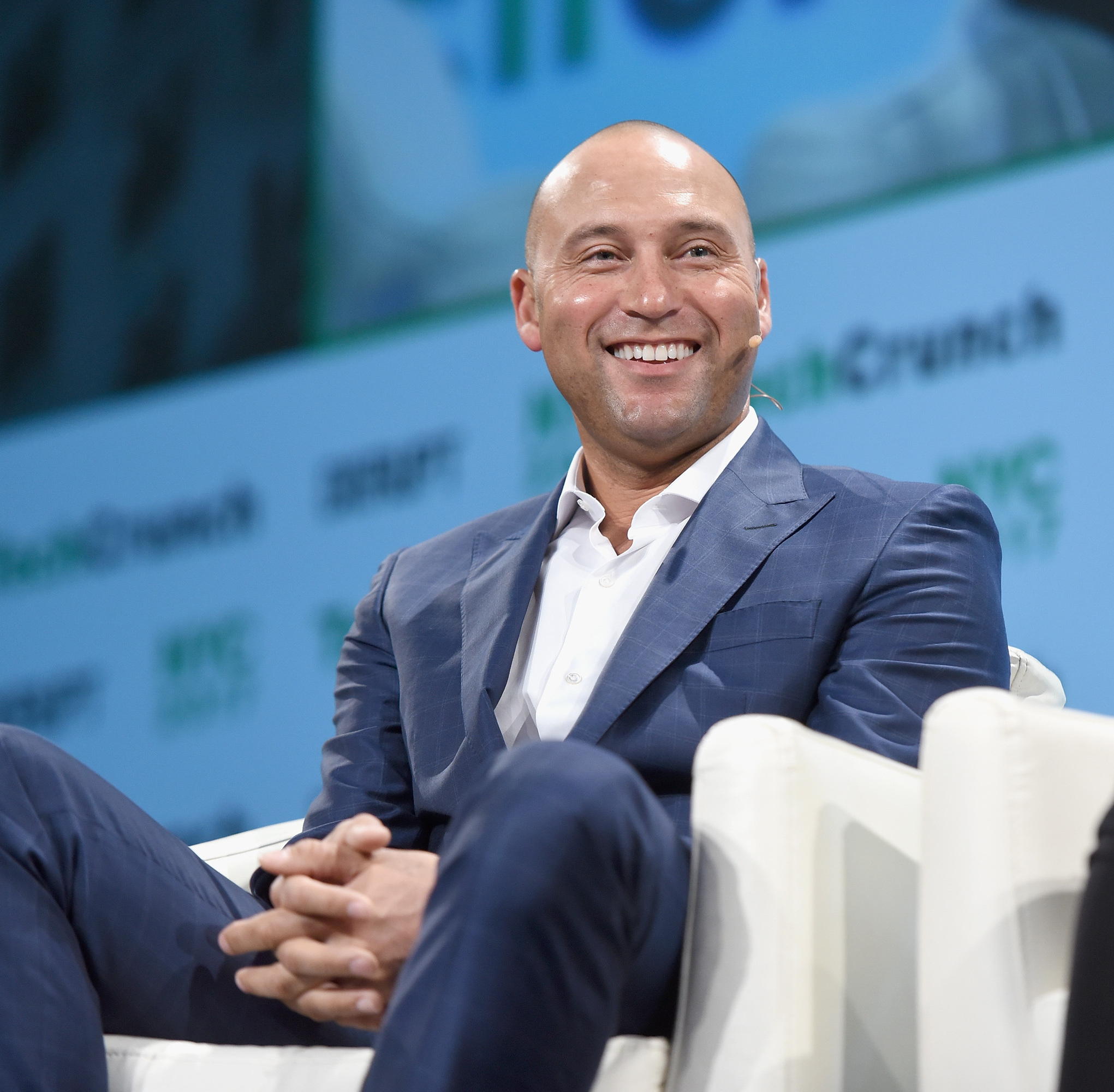
Derek Jeter

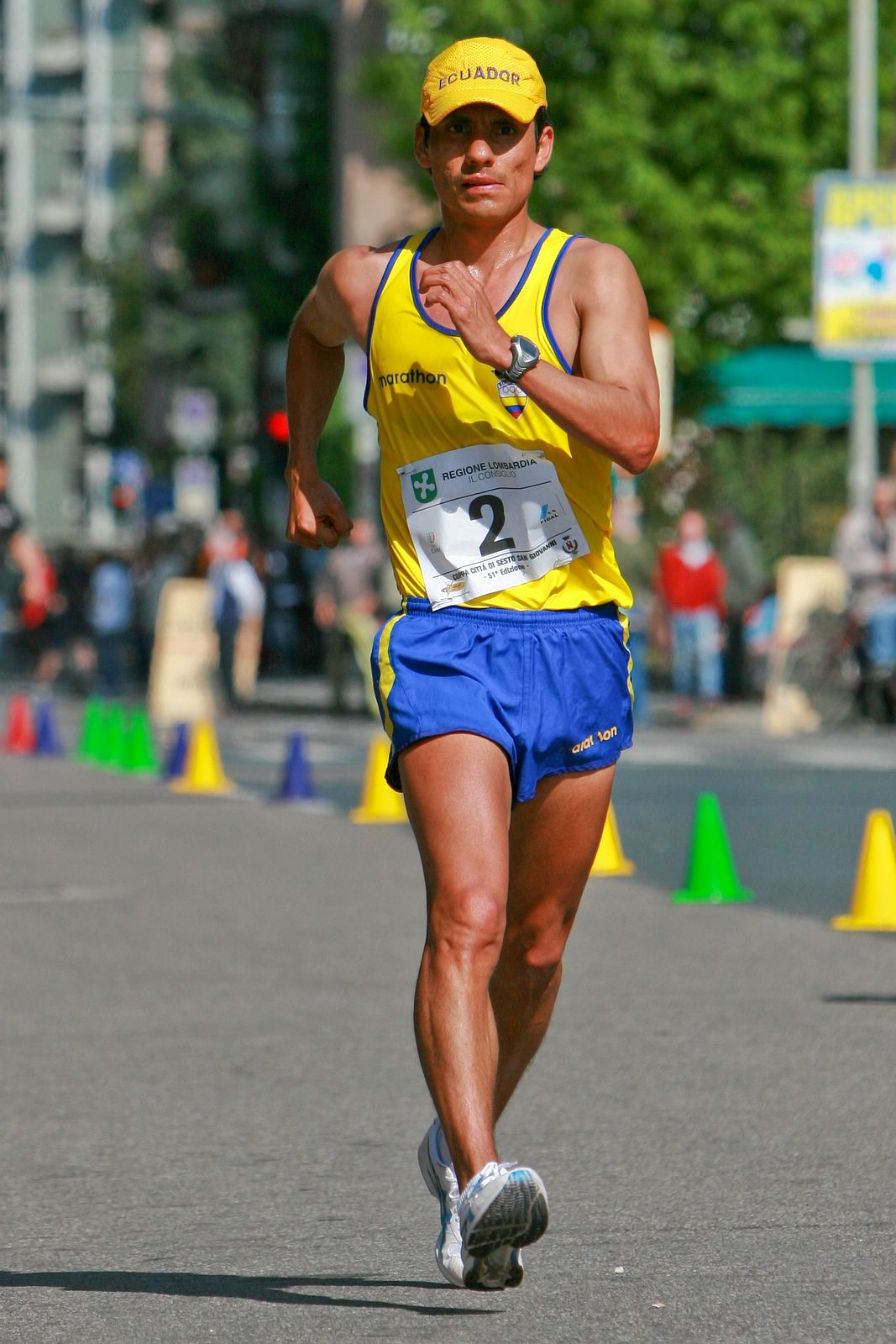
Jefferson Pérez

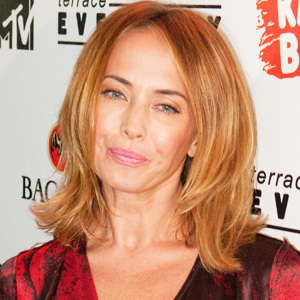
Jeanna Friske

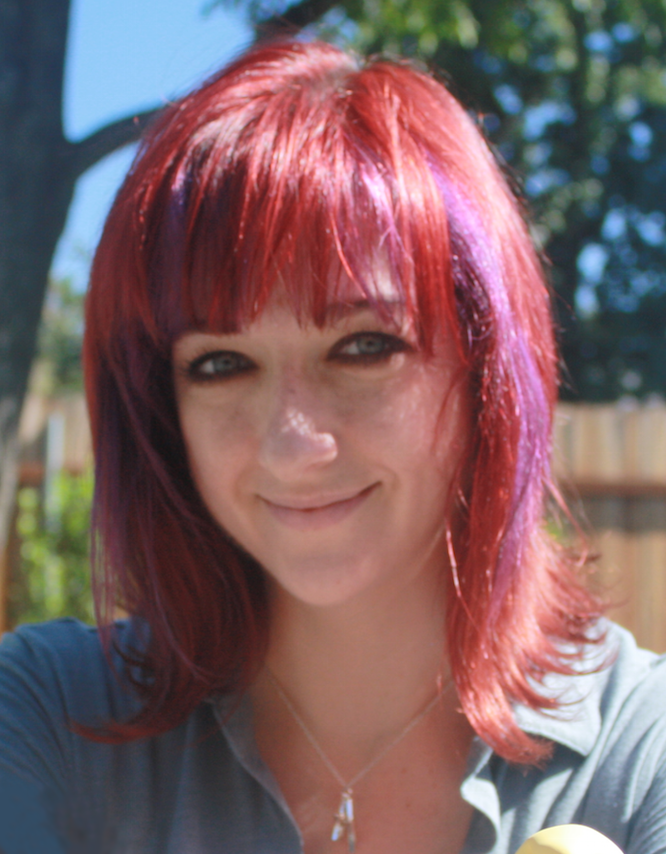
Lauren Faust

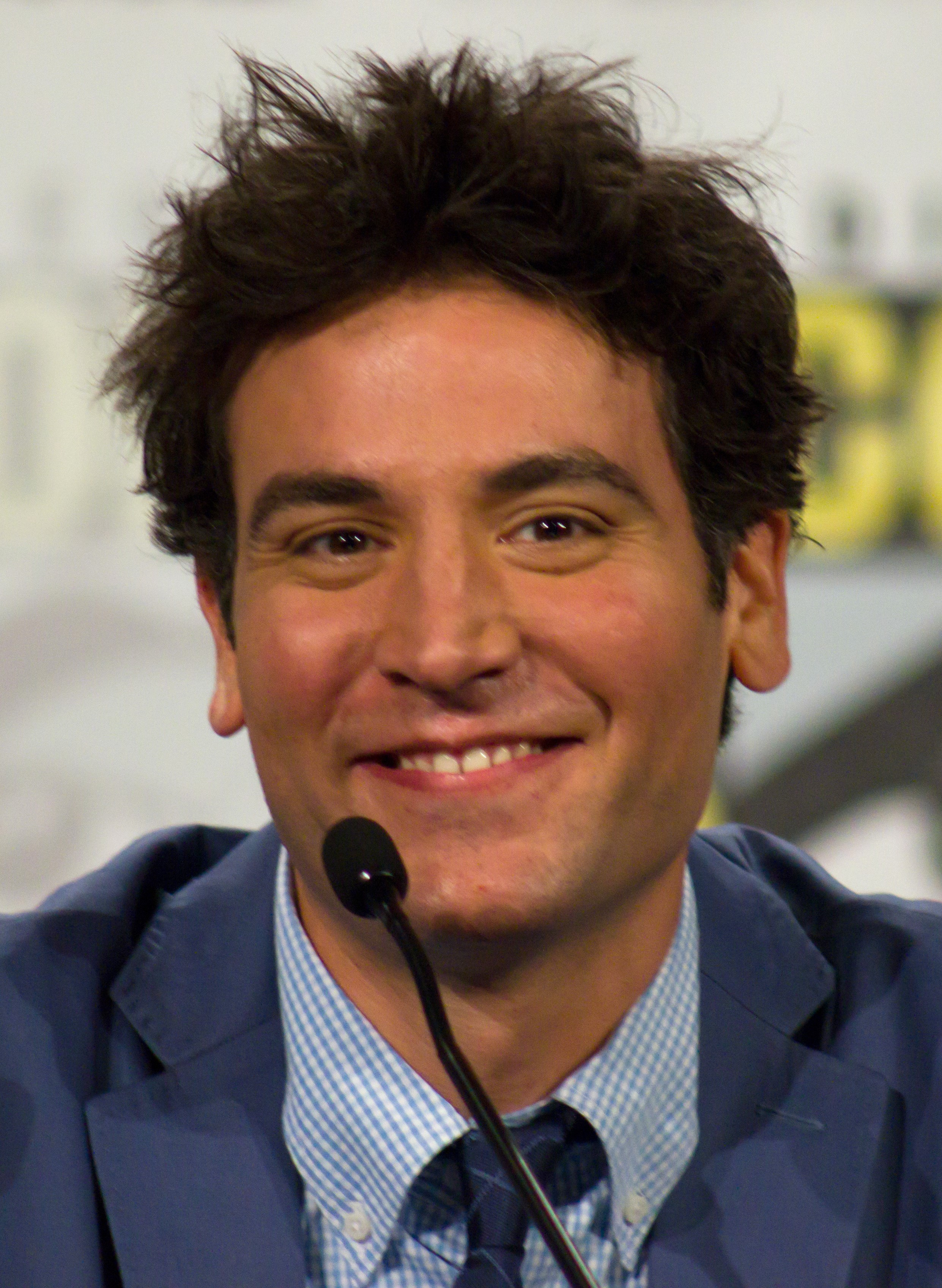
Josh Radnor

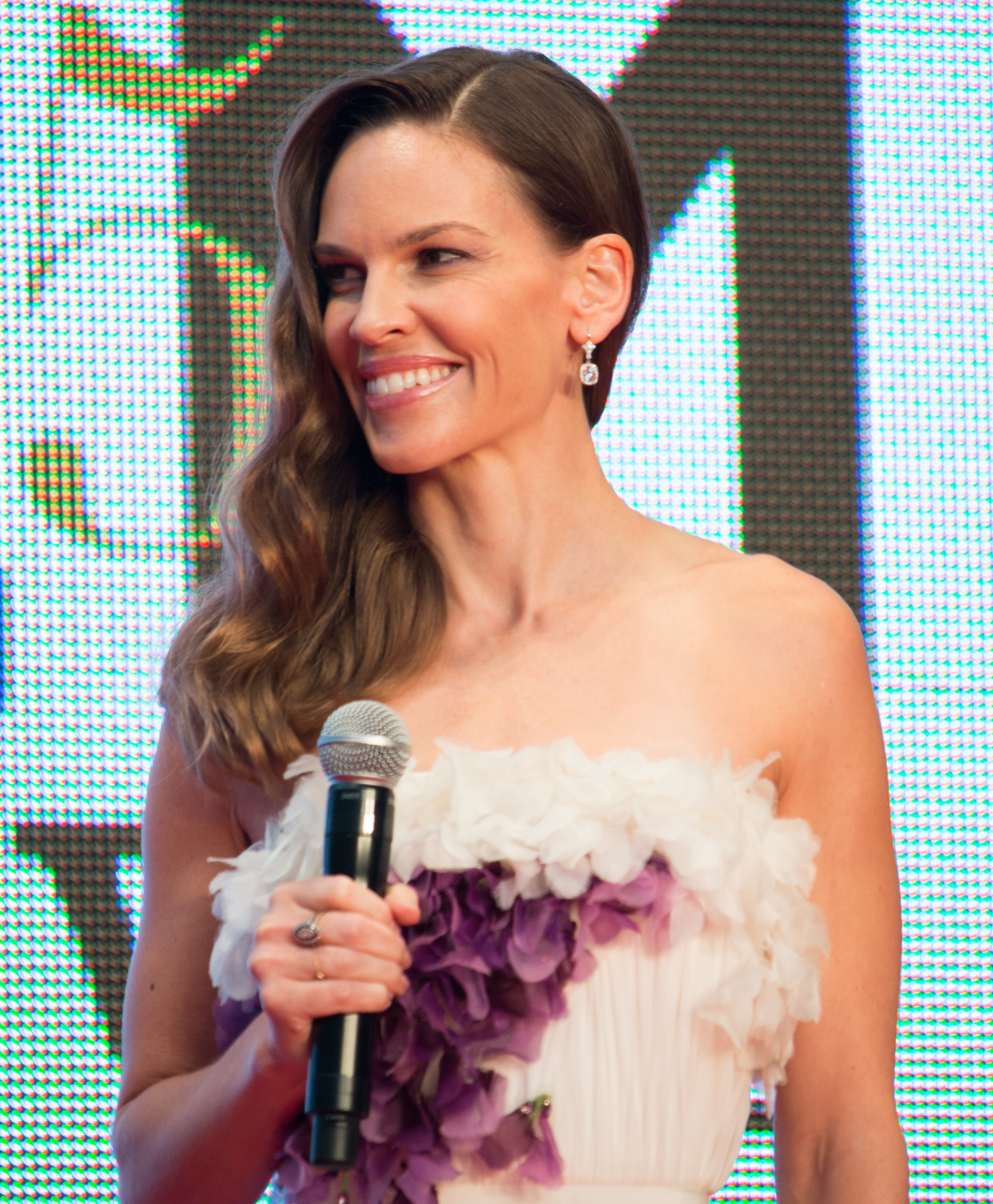
Hilary Swank

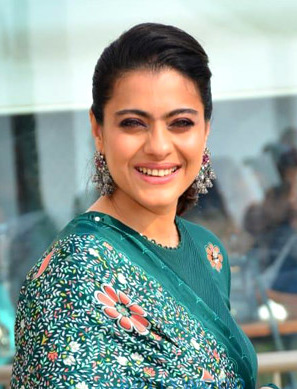
Kajol

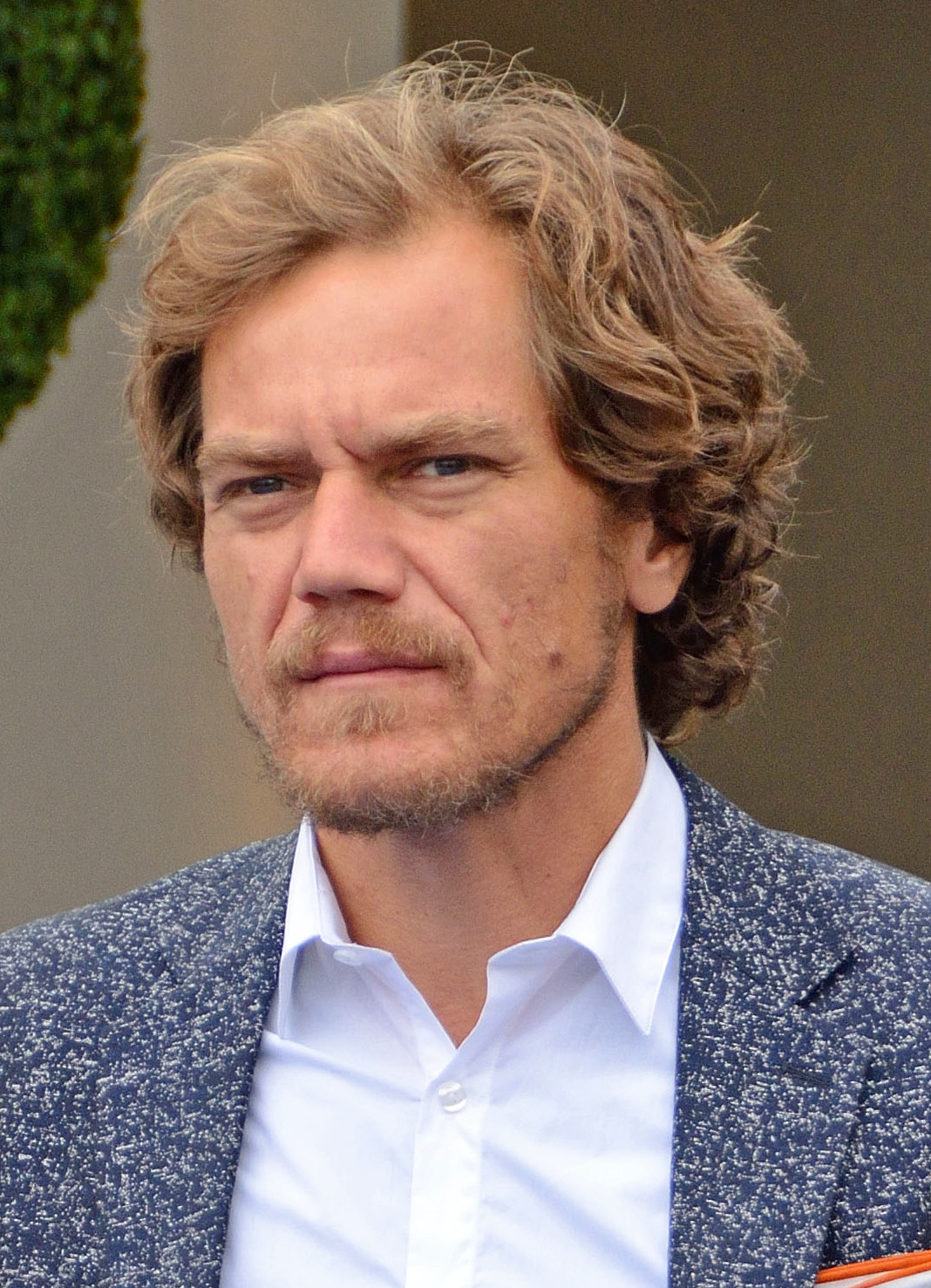
Michael Shannon

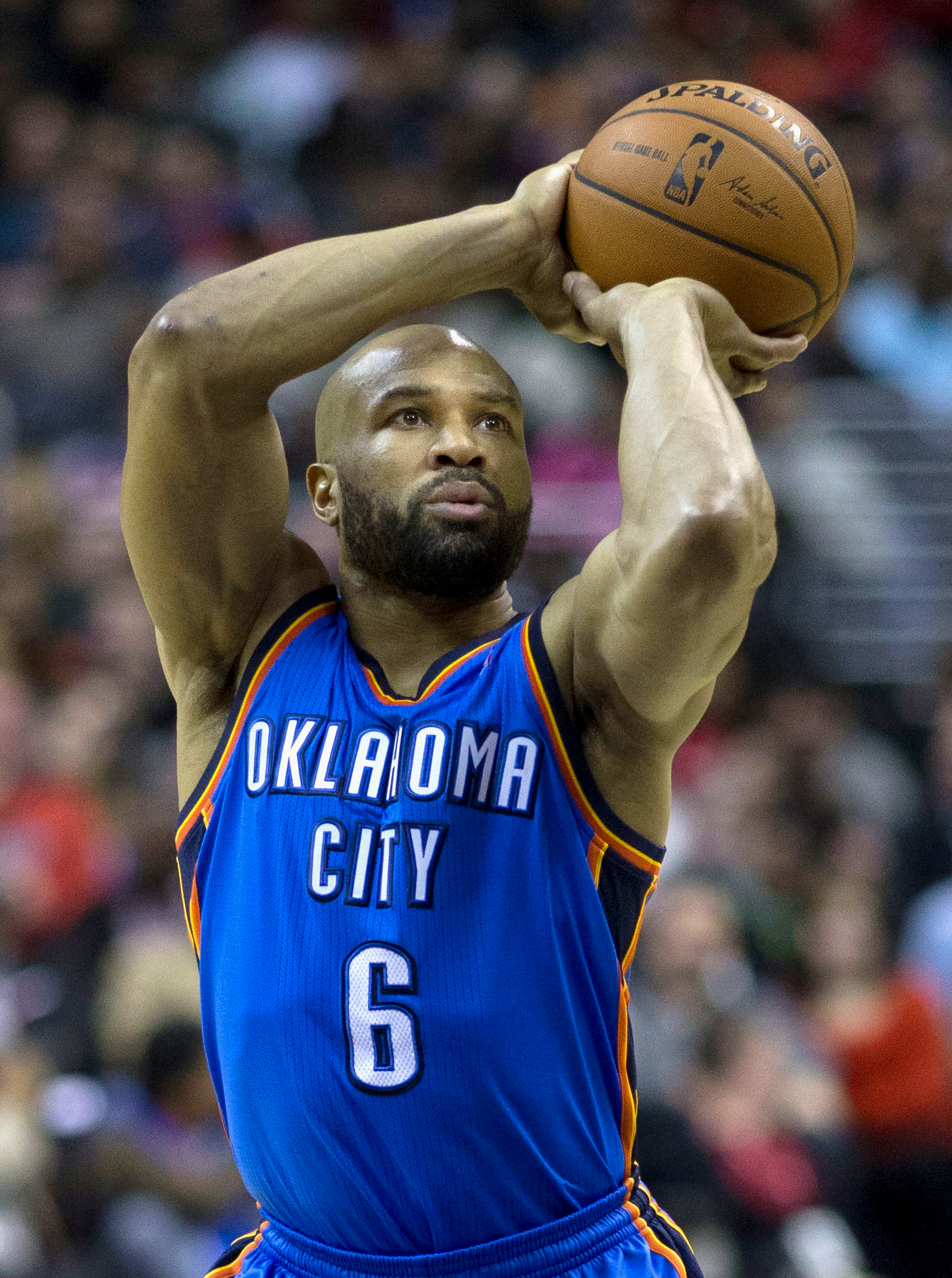
Derek Fisher

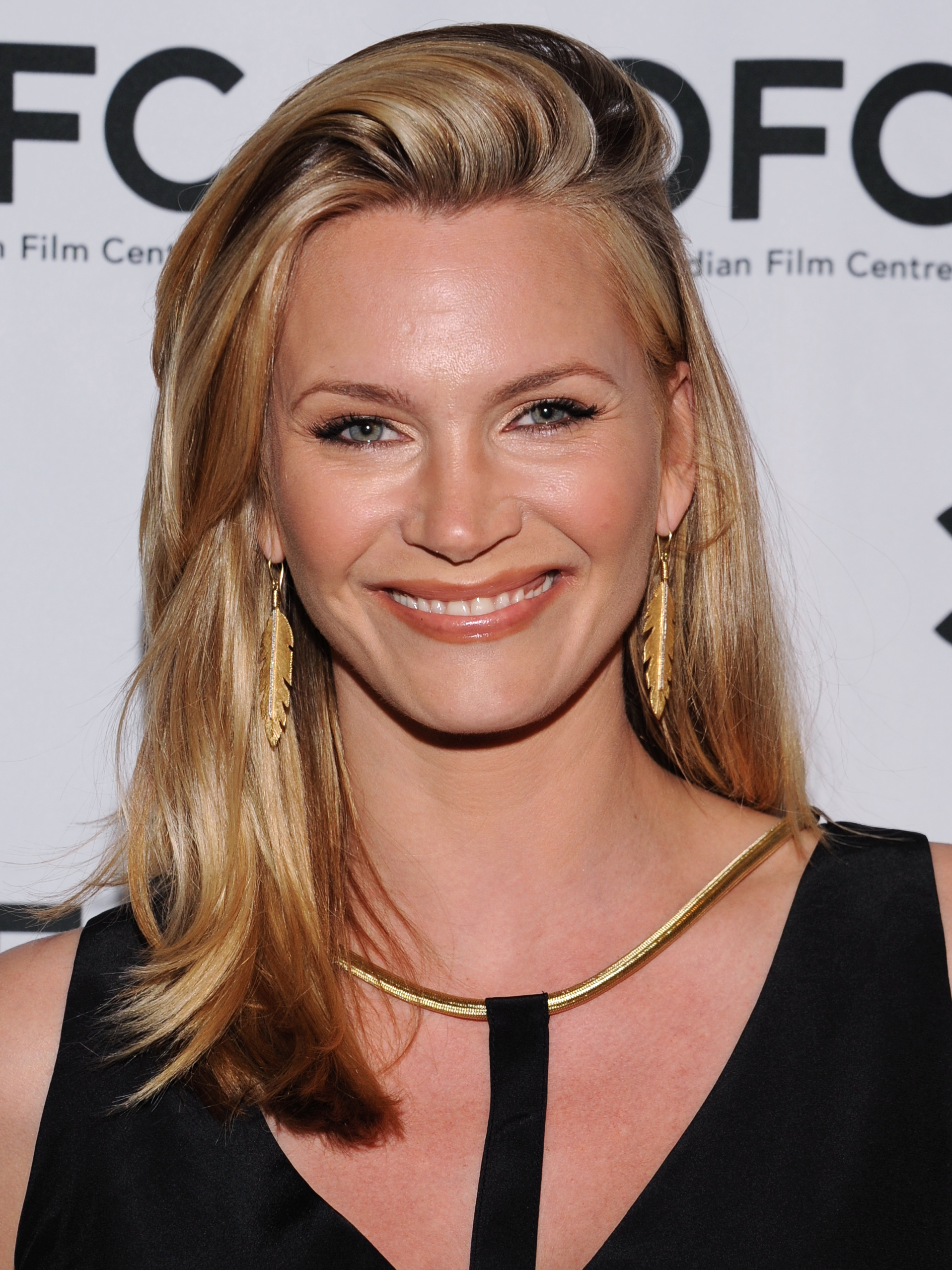
Natasha Henstridge

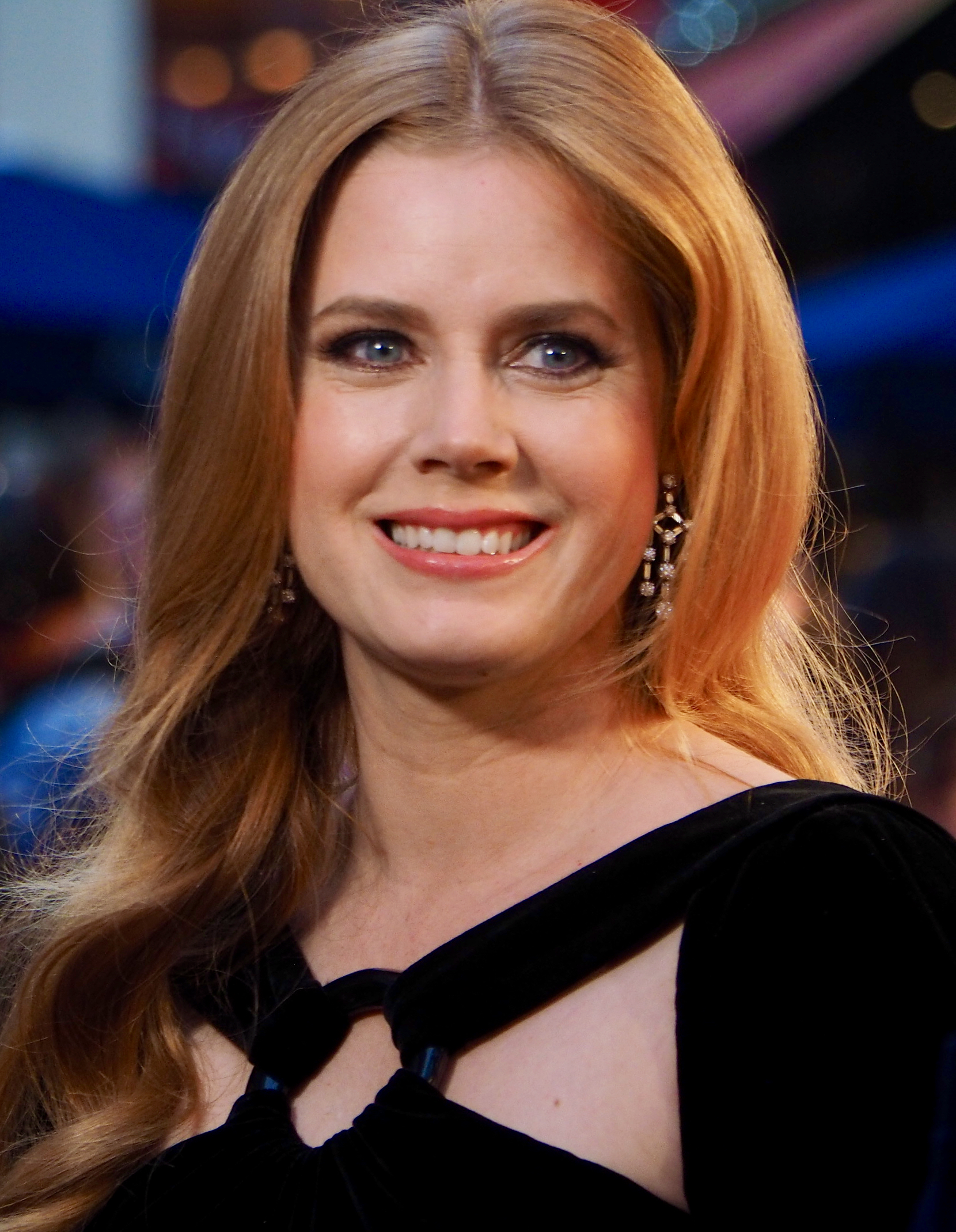
Amy Adams

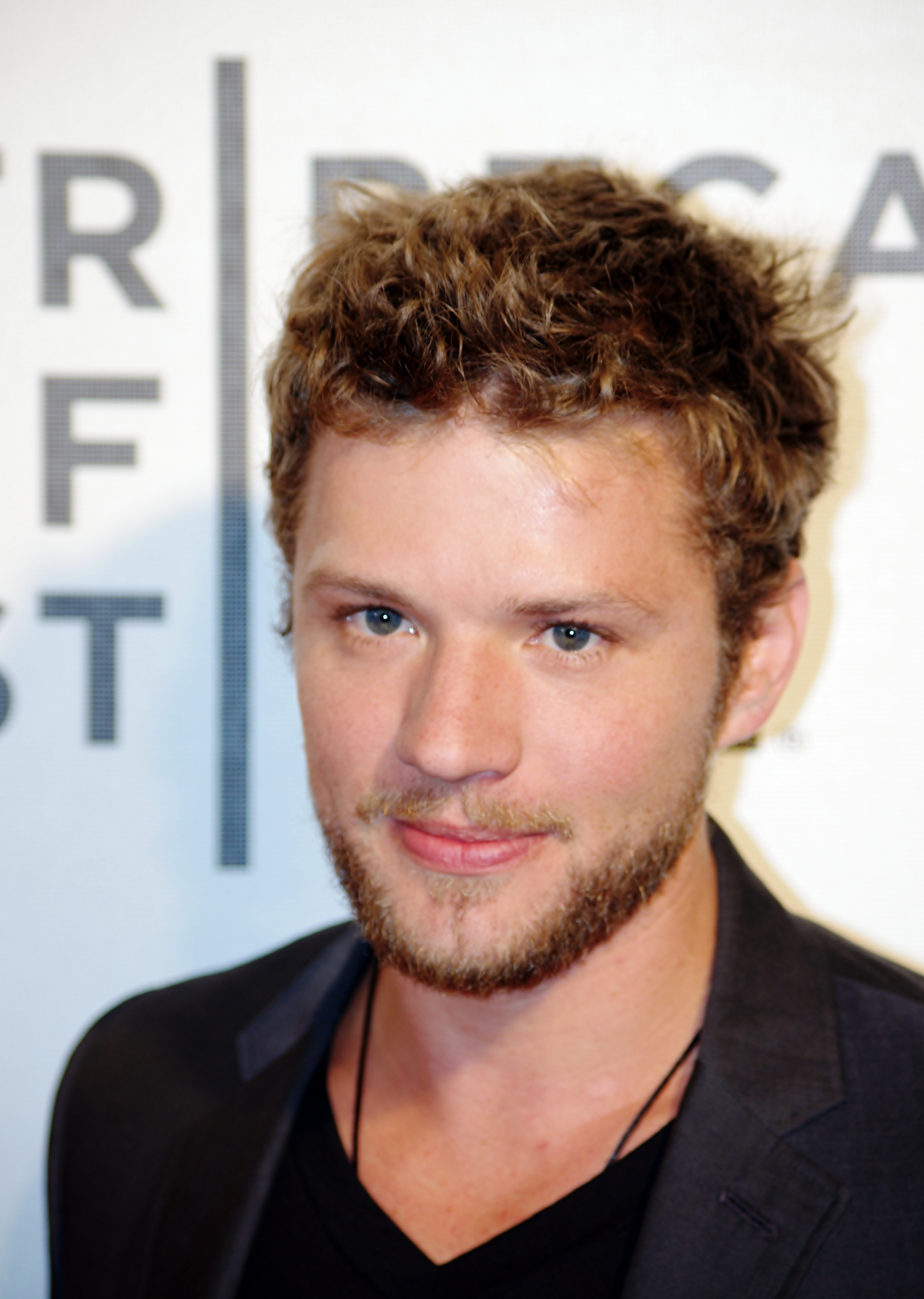
Ryan Phillippe

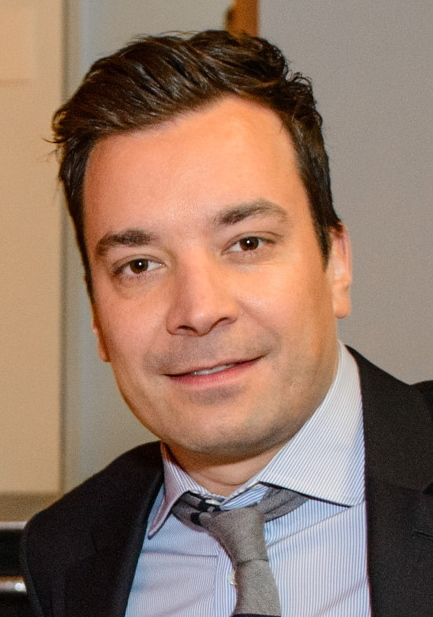
Jimmy Fallon

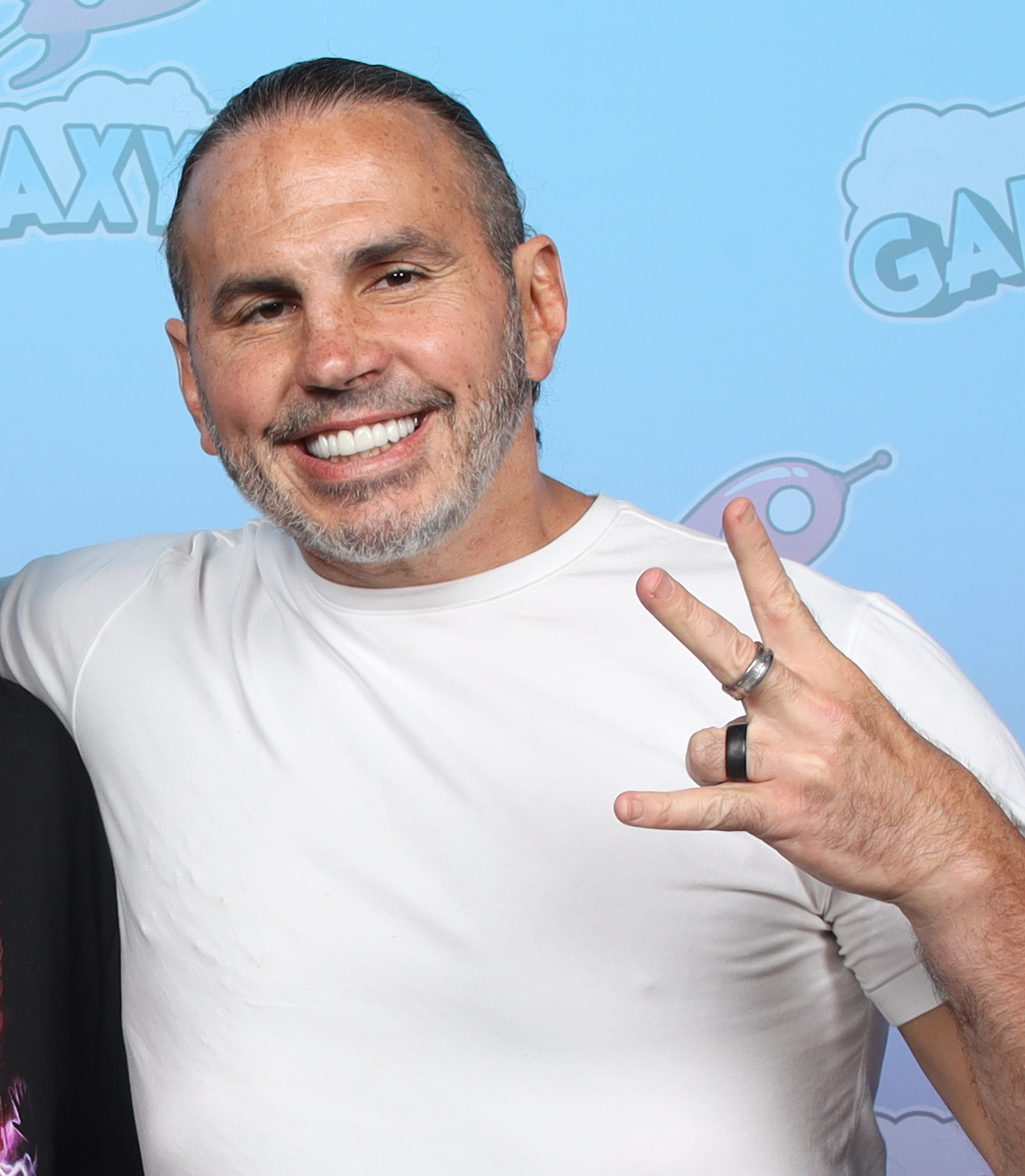
Matt Hardy

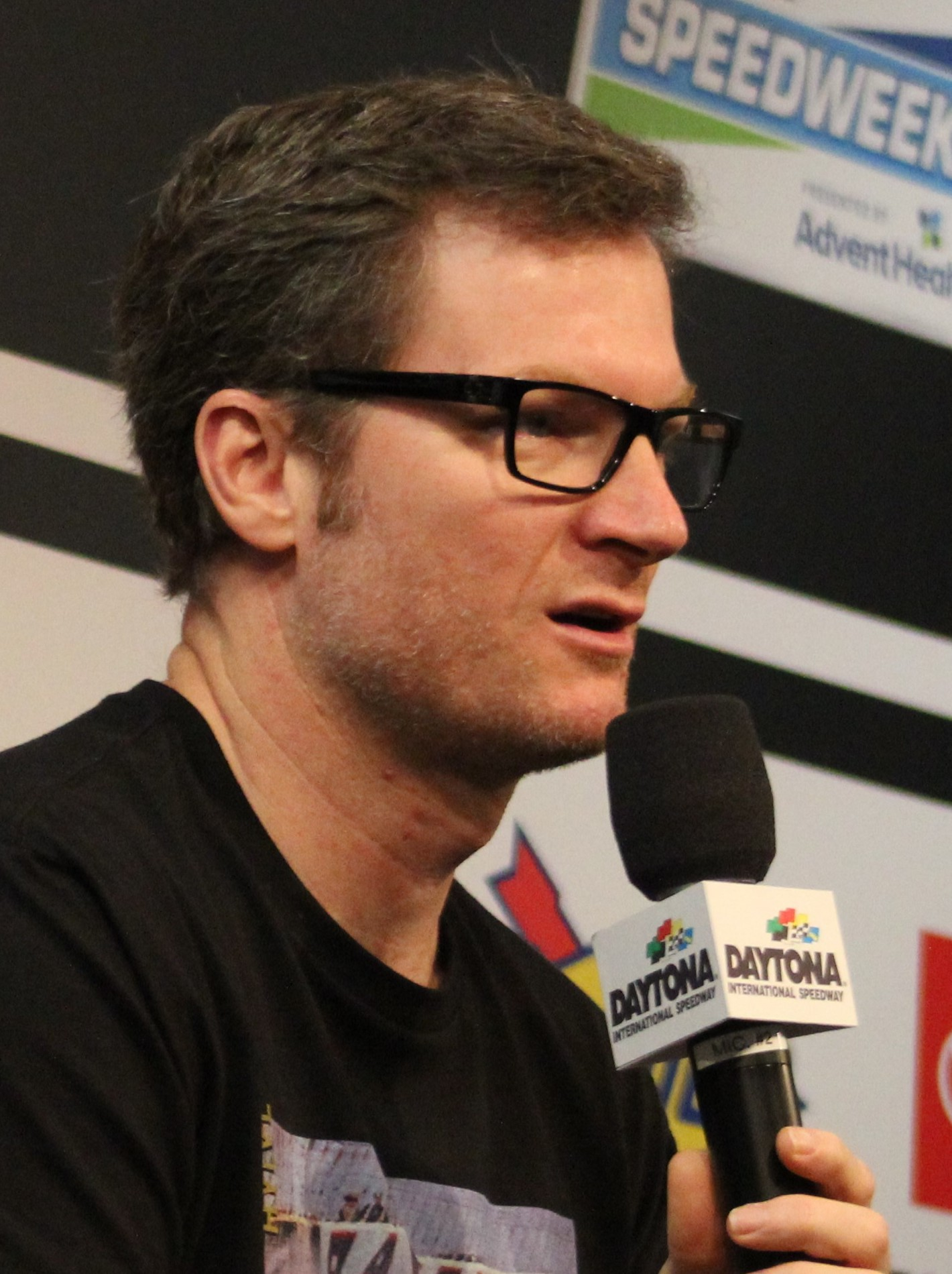
Dale Earnhardt Jr.

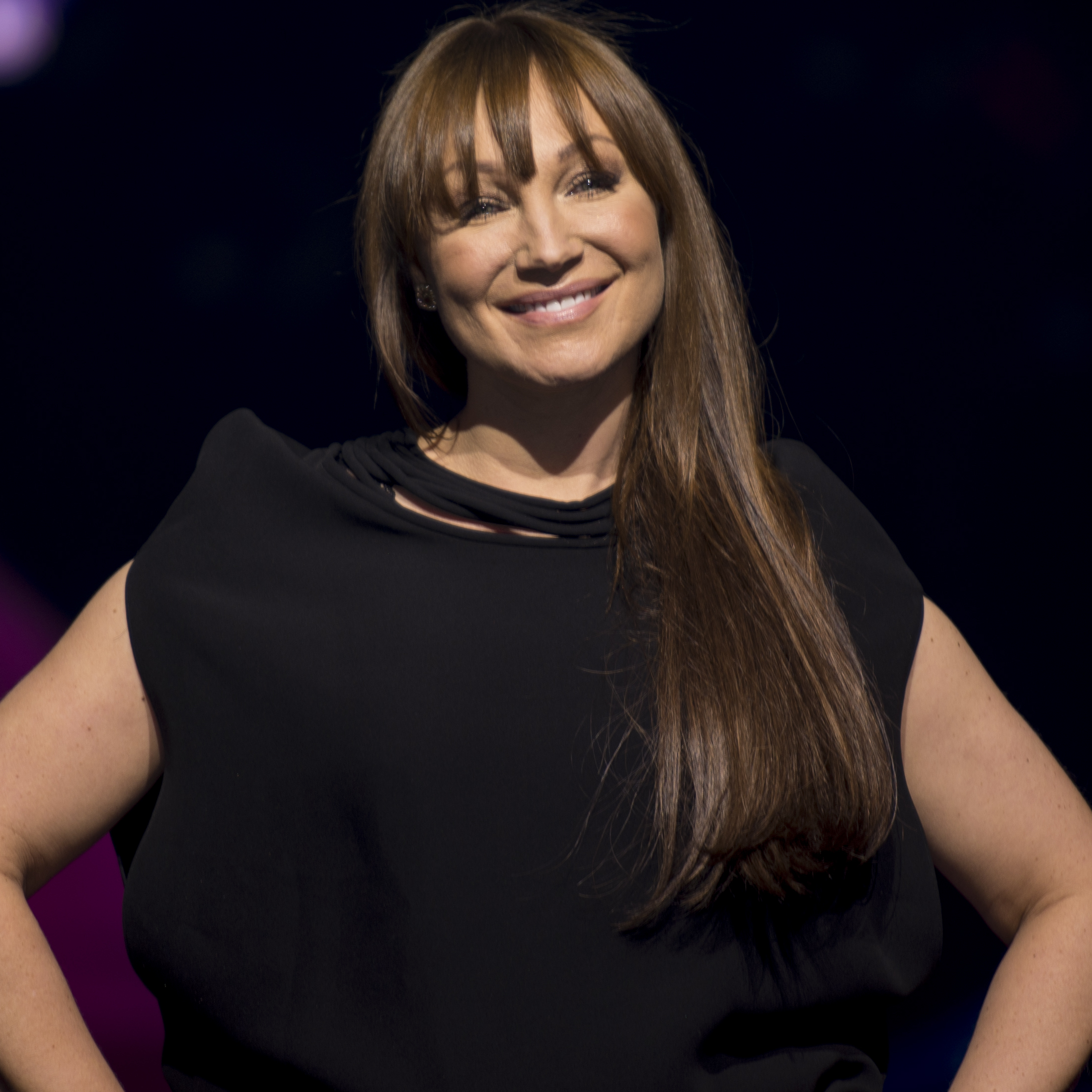
Charlotte Perrelli

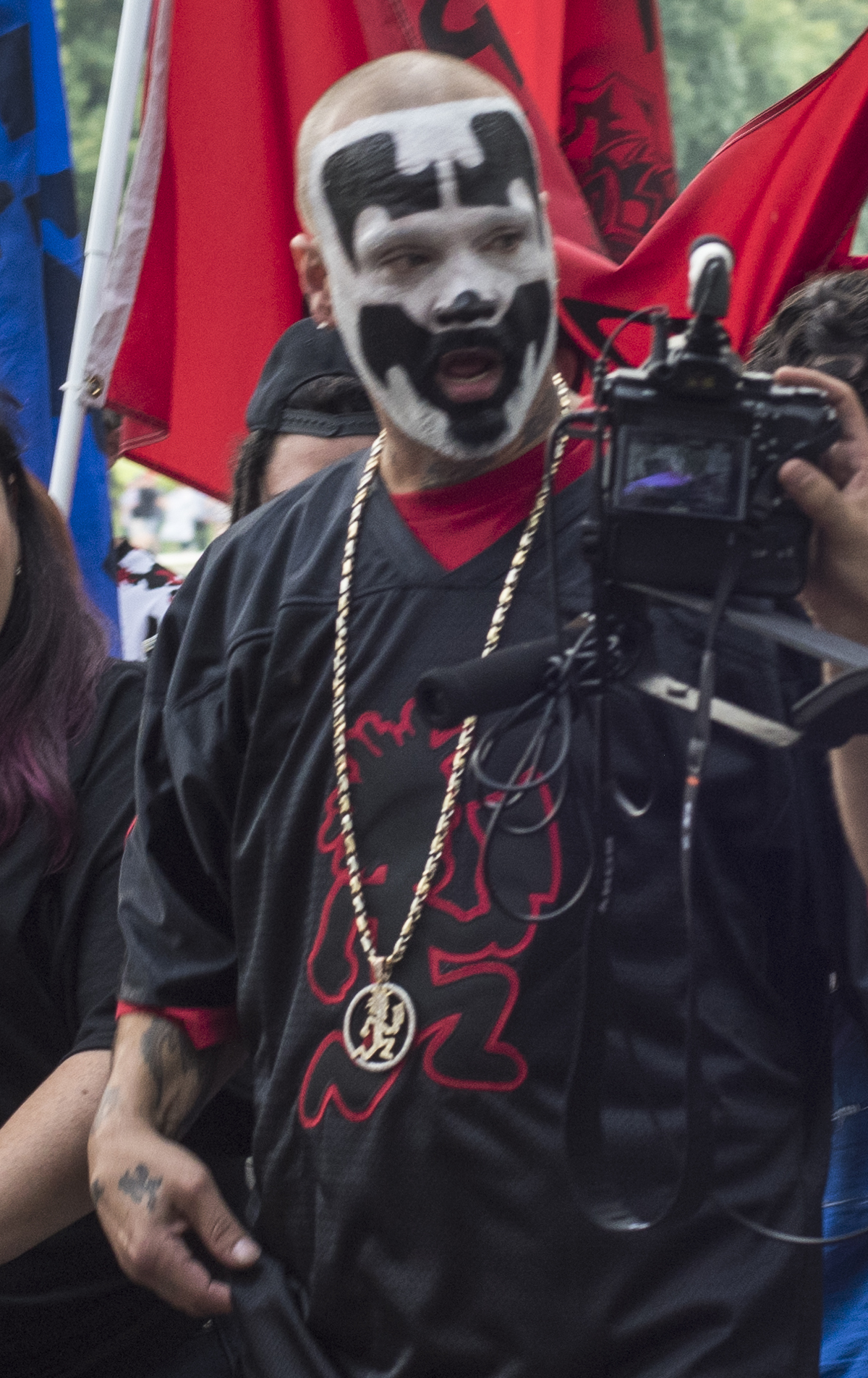
Shaggy 2 Dope

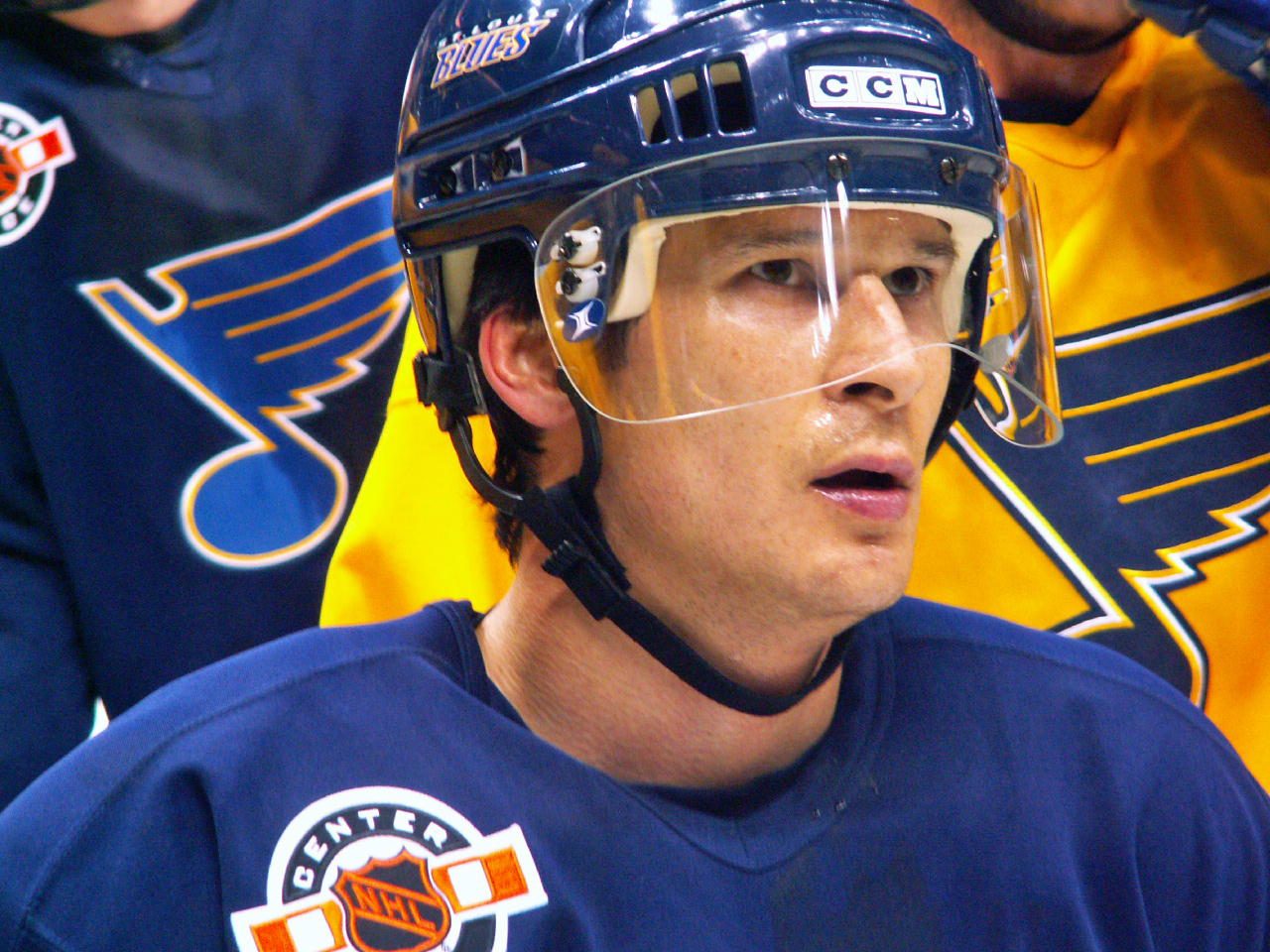
Paul Kariya

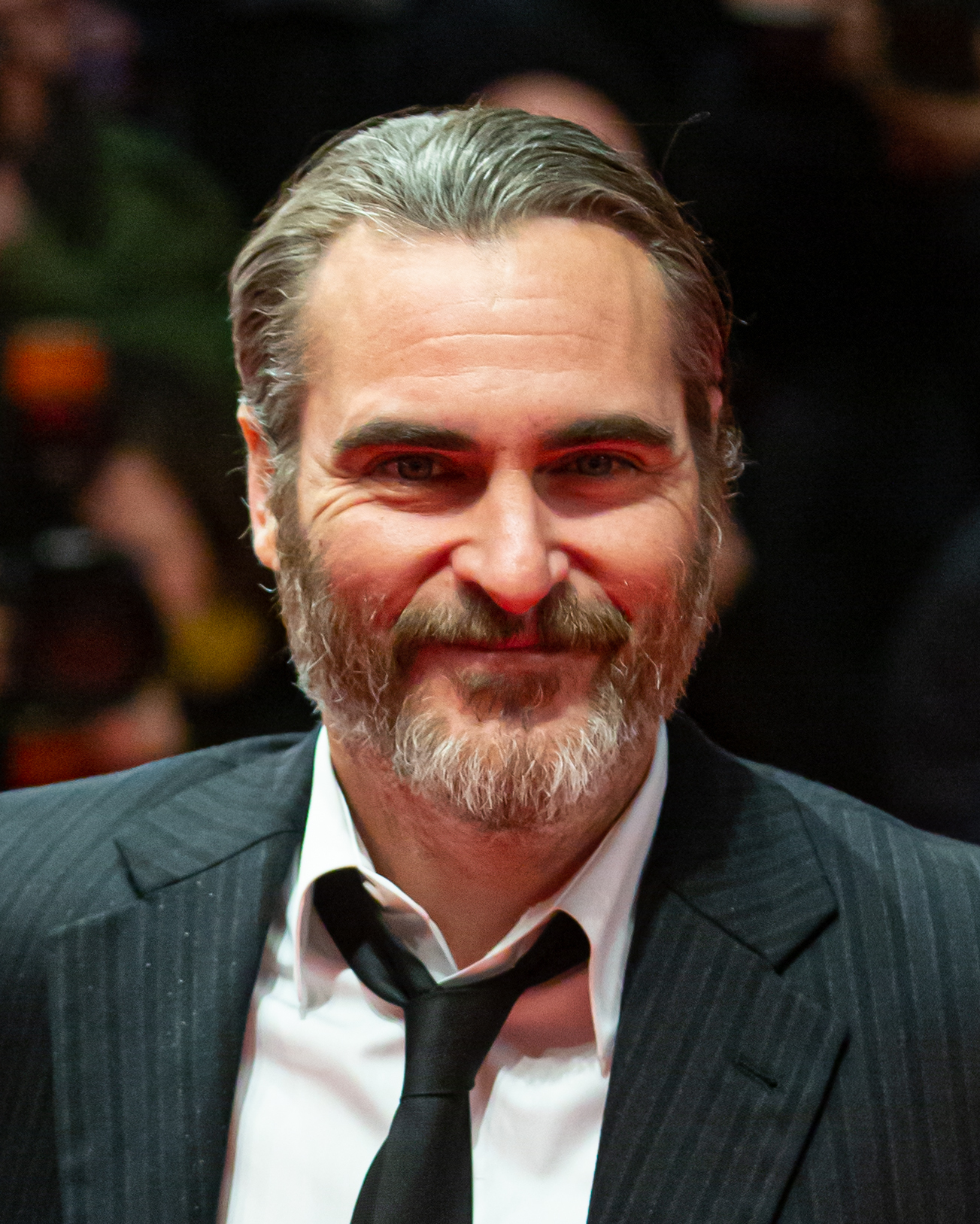
Joaquin Phoenix

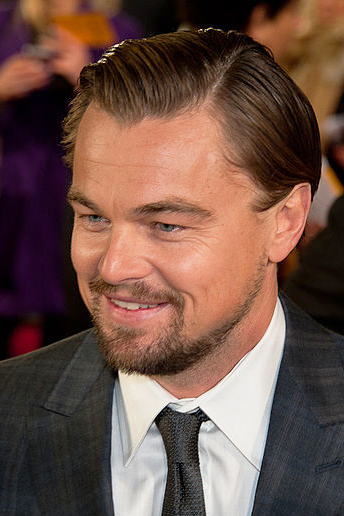
Leonardo DiCaprio

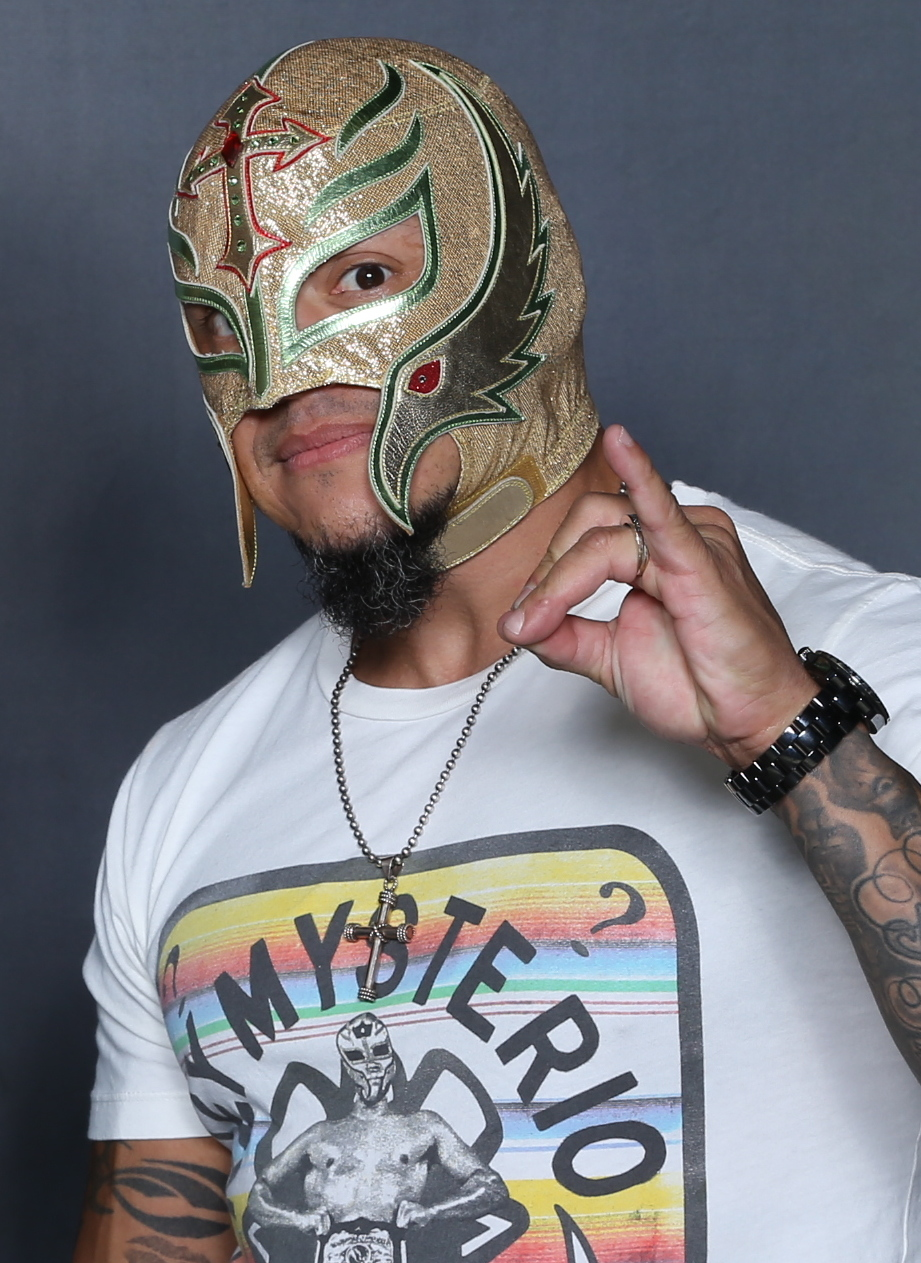
Rey Mysterio

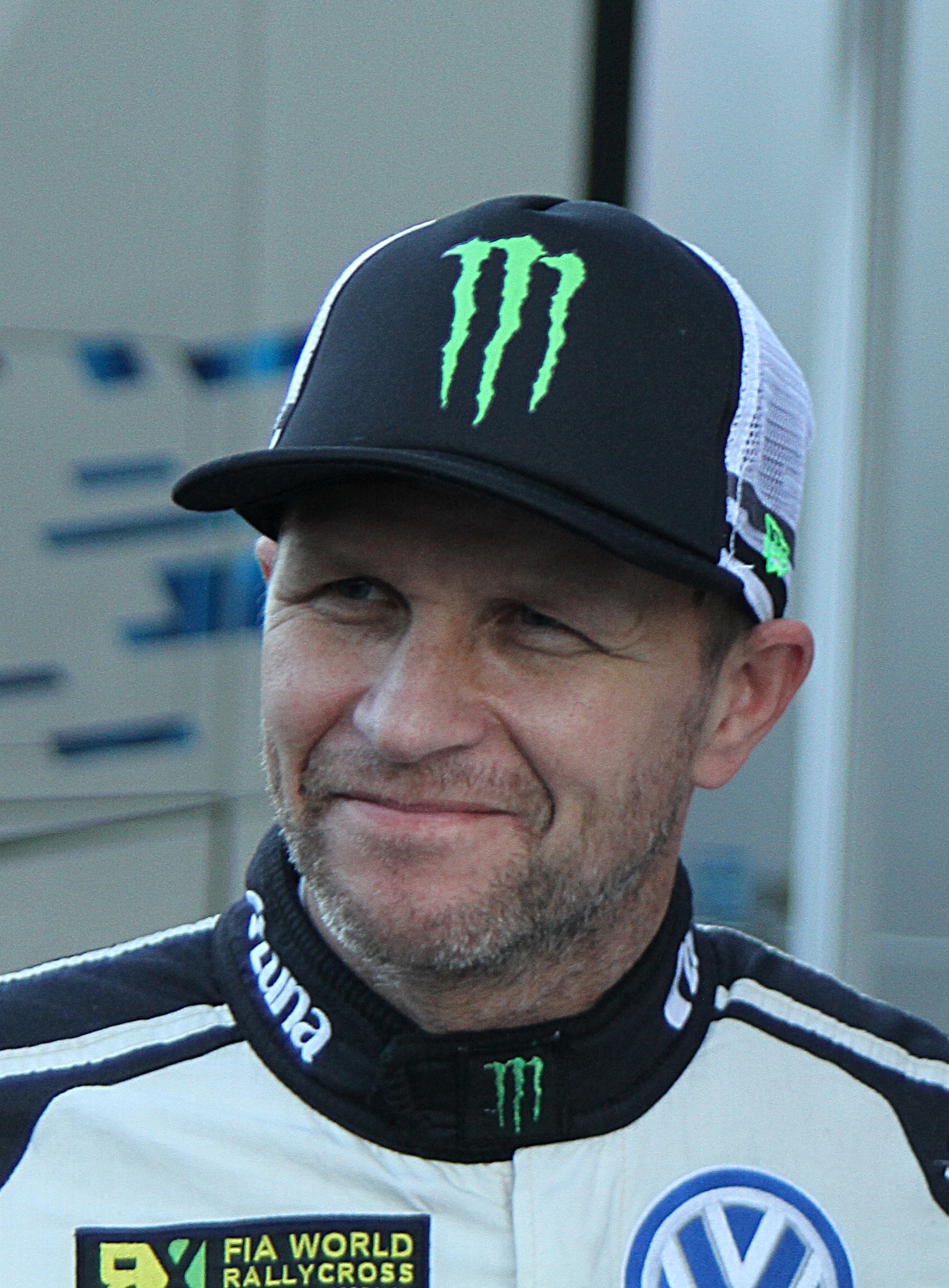
Petter Solberg

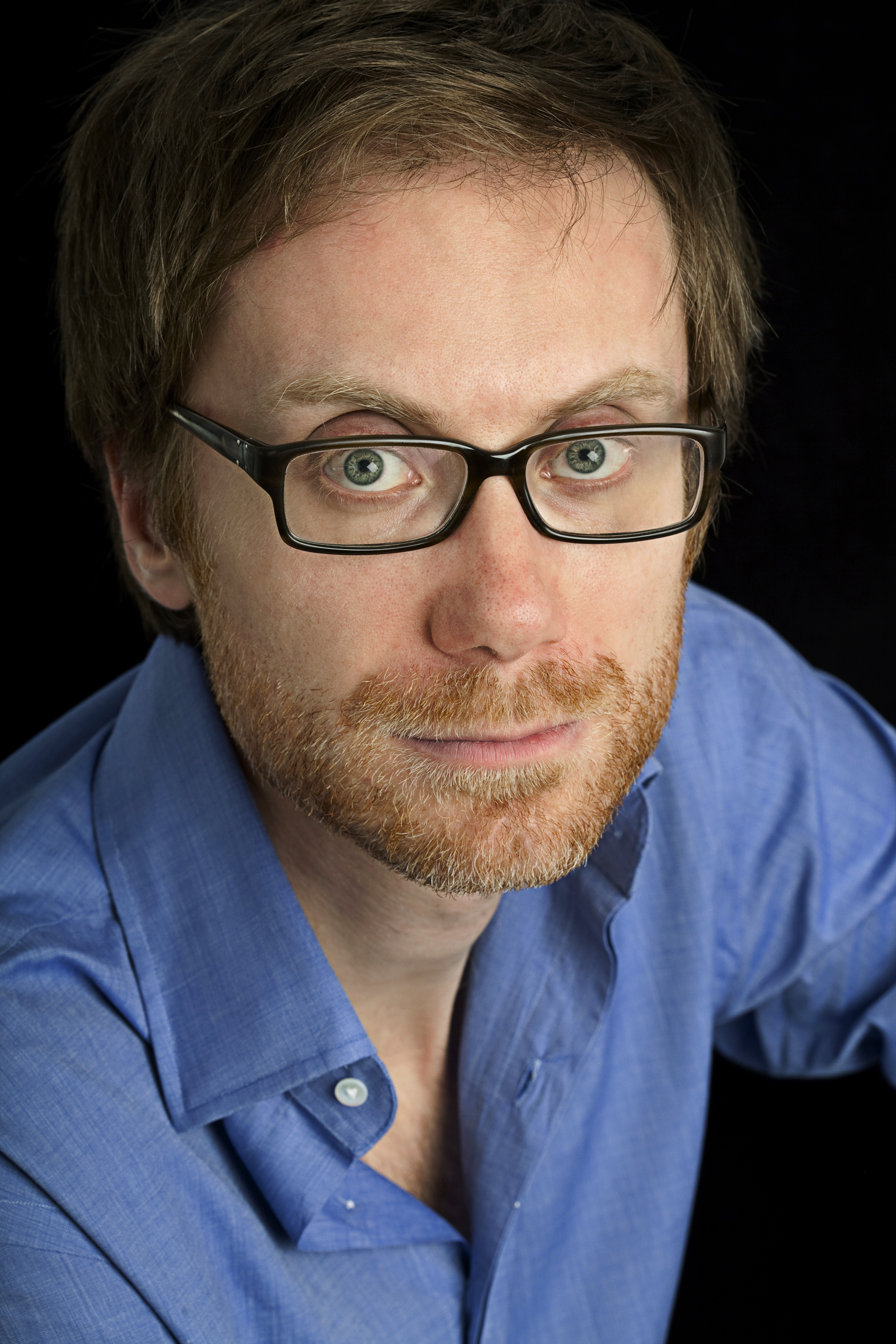
Stephen Merchant

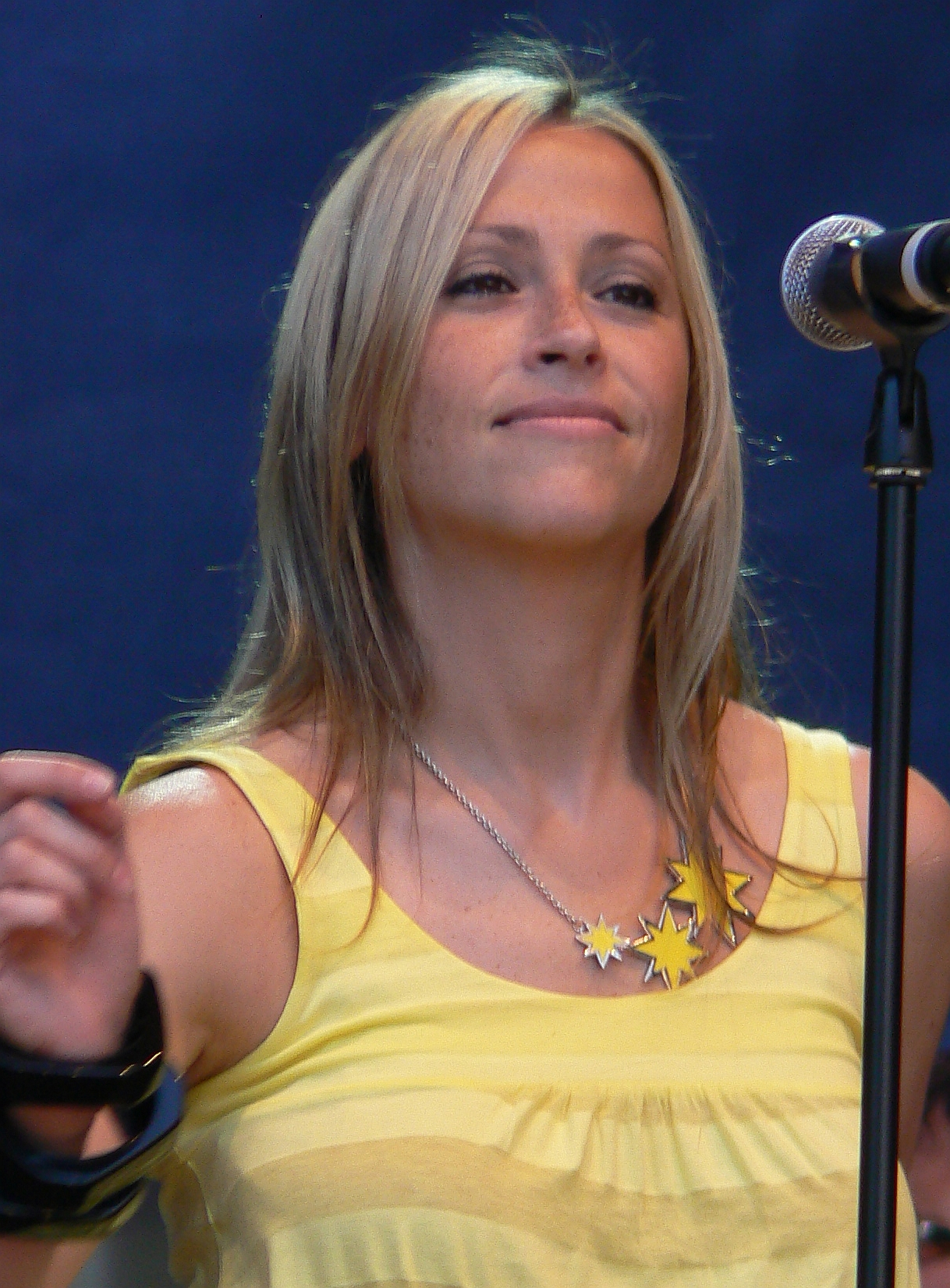
Nicole Appleton

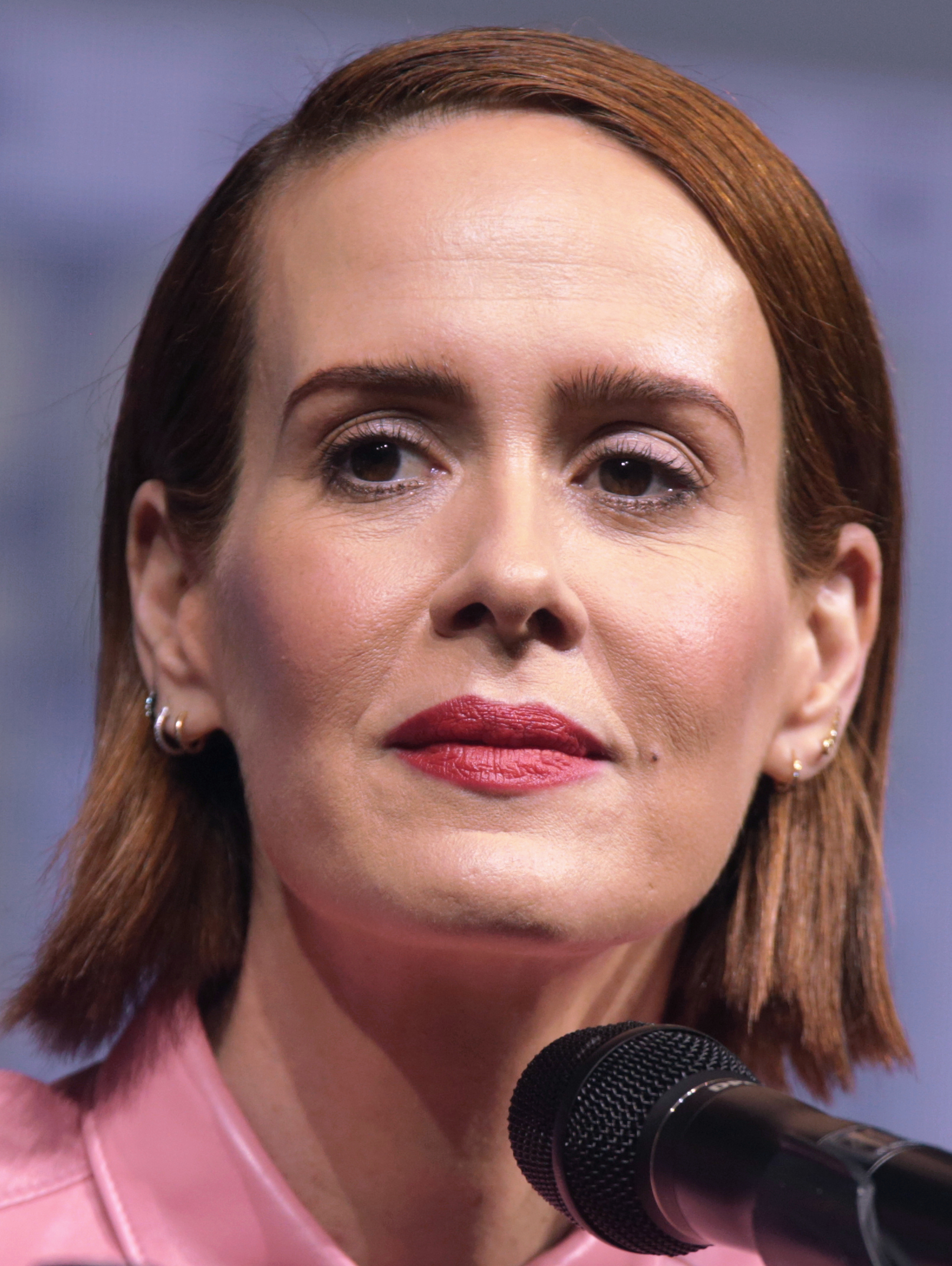
Sarah Paulson

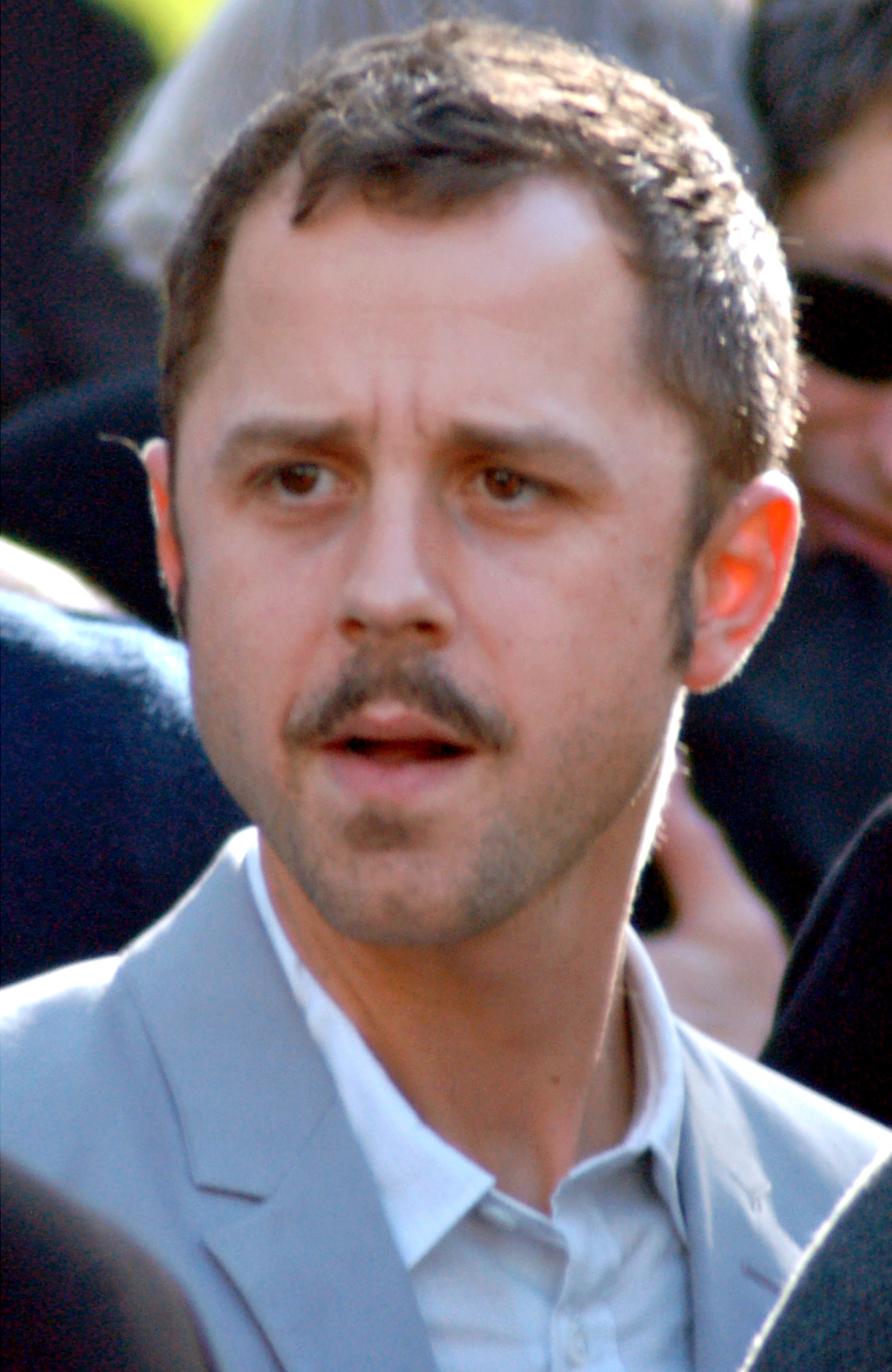
Giovanni Ribisi

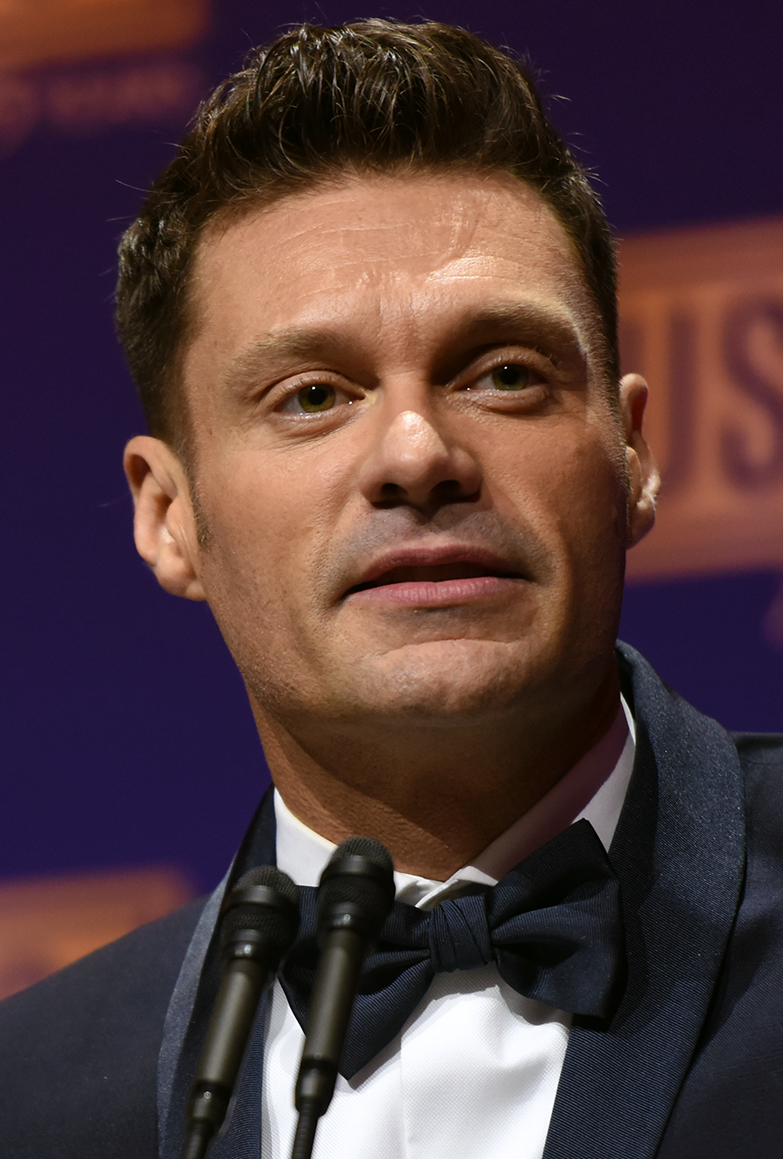
Ryan Seacrest

=== January ===
- January 3
  - Robert-Jan Derksen, Dutch golfer
  - Alessandro Petacchi, Italian road cyclist
  - Katie Porter, American politician
- January 9 – Farhan Akhtar, Indian film director, screenwriter, actor, singer, producer, and television host
- January 10
  - Hrithik Roshan, Indian actor
  - Jemaine Clement, New Zealand actor
- January 12
  - Melanie C, English pop singer (Spice Girls)
  - Tor Arne Hetland, Norwegian cross-country skier
- January 14
  - Kevin Durand, Canadian-American actor and singer
- January 16 – Kate Moss, English model
- January 19 – Natassia Malthe, Norwegian actress and model
- January 21 – Elaine Quijano, American journalist
- January 22 – Joseph Muscat, 13th Prime Minister of Malta
- January 23
  - Tiffani Thiessen, American actress
  - Norah O'Donnell, American television journalist
- January 24 – Ed Helms, American actor and stand-up comedian
- January 25 – Emily Haines, American-Canadian singer
- January 27 – Ole Einar Bjørndalen, Norwegian biathlete
- January 28 – Kari Traa, Norwegian freestyle skier
- January 29
  - Michael Andersen, Danish basketball player
  - Kōji Wada, Japanese rock singer (d. 2016)
- January 30
  - Christian Bale, British actor
  - Olivia Colman, English actress

=== February ===
- February 1 – Roberto Heras, Spanish road cyclist
- February 3
  - Shahab Hosseini, Iranian actor and film director
  - Ayanna Pressley, American politician
  - Miriam Yeung, Hong Kong actress and singer
- February 4
  - Urmila Matondkar, Indian actress
- February 7
  - J Dilla, American record producer and rapper (d. 2006)
  - Steve Nash, Canadian basketball player
  - Nujabes, Japanese record producer and DJ (d. 2010)
  - Femke Zeedijk-Raeven, Dutch politician
- February 8
  - Seth Green, American actor and comedian
  - Guy-Manuel de Homem-Christo, French musician and record producer
  - Kimbo Slice, Bahamian-born American boxer and mixed martial artist (d. 2016)
- February 10
  - Elizabeth Banks, American actress and film director
  - David Datuna, Georgian-American artist (d. 2022)
  - Ivri Lider, Israeli singer
- February 11 – Alex Jones, American radio host, conspiracy theorist, author and filmmaker
- February 12 – Naseem Hamed, British boxer
- February 13 – Robbie Williams, British singer
- February 14
  - Philippe Léonard, Belgian footballer
  - Valentina Vezzali, Italian fencer
- February 15
  - Mr Lordi, Finnish singer
  - Alexander Wurz, Austrian racing driver
- February 16 – Mahershala Ali, American actor and rapper
- February 17
  - Jerry O'Connell, American actor
- February 18
  - Nadine Labaki, Lebanese film director, actress and activist
- February 19 – Pedro Alliana, Paraguayan politician, 53rd President of Paraguay
- February 22
  - James Blunt, English singer
  - David Pelletier, Canadian pair skater
- February 25
  - Divya Bharti, Indian film actress (d. 1993)
  - Dominic Raab, British politician, Deputy Prime Minister of the United Kingdom
- February 26 – Sébastien Loeb, French rally driver
- February 27
  - Carte Goodwin, former United States senator from West Virginia
  - Hiroyasu Shimizu, Japanese speed skater

=== March ===
- March 4
  - Karol Kučera, Slovak tennis player
  - Ariel Ortega, Argentine football player
- March 5
  - Jens Jeremies, German footballer
  - Matt Lucas, British actor and comedian
  - Eva Mendes, American actress and model
  - Hiten Tejwani, Indian model and actor
- March 6 – Anthony Carelli, Canadian professional wrestler
- March 7
  - Jenna Fischer, American actress
  - Antonio de la Rúa, Argentine lawyer
- March 9 – Nalbert Bitencourt, Brazilian volleyball player
- March 14 – Grace Park, Canadian actress
- March 13
  - Thomas Enqvist, Swedish tennis player
  - Vampeta, Brazilian football player and coach
- March 15 – Percy Montgomery, South African rugby union player
- March 19 – Vida Guerra, Cuban born-American model and actress
- March 20 – Carsten Ramelow, German footballer
- March 21 – Rhys Darby, New Zealand actor and comedian
- March 22
  - Marcus Camby, American basketball player
  - Kidada Jones, American actress
  - Bassem Youssef, Egyptian journalist and comedian
- March 23 – Jaume Collet-Serra, Spanish-American film director and producer
- March 24 – Alyson Hannigan, American actress
- March 26 – Laurel Lee, American politician and lawyer
- March 28 – Daisuke Kishio, Japanese voice actor
- March 29 – Miguel Gómez, Colombian photographer
- March 30 – Miho Komatsu, Japanese pop singer and songwriter
- March 31
  - Natali, Russian singer, composer and songwriter
  - Jani Sievinen, Finnish swimmer

=== April ===
- April 2 – Håkan Hellström, Swedish musician
- April 6 – Robert Kovač, Croatian football player and coach
- April 8 – Chris Kyle, American sniper (d. 2013)
- April 9 – Jenna Jameson, American adult actress and model
- April 11
  - Àlex Corretja, Spanish tennis player
  - Tricia Helfer, Canadian actress and model
- April 12
  - Marley Shelton, American actress
  - Sylvinho, Brazilian footballer
- April 13 – Marta Jandová, Czech musician and actress
- April 15
  - Danny Pino, Cuban American actor
  - Tim Thomas, American Ice Hockey player
- April 16 – Xu Jinglei, Chinese actress and director
- April 17
  - Mikael Åkerfeldt, Swedish musician (Opeth)
  - Victoria Beckham, English singer and fashion designer
- April 18
  - Lorraine Pilkington, Irish actress
  - Edgar Wright, English film director
- April 21 – Oleksiy Zhuravko, Ukrainian politician (d. 2022)
- April 23 – Jennifer Paz, Filipino actress
- April 24 – Stephen Wiltshire, British architectural artist and autistic savant
- April 25 – Grant Achatz, American chef and restaurateur
- April 28 – Penélope Cruz, Spanish actress and model
- April 29 – Anggun, Indonesian-French singer-songwriter

=== May ===
- May 1 – Lornah Kiplagat, Kenyan-Dutch runner
- May 2 – Matt Berry, English actor and singer
- May 3 – Princess Haya bint Al Hussein of Jordan
- May 7
  - Lawrence Johnson, American pole vaulter
  - Breckin Meyer, American actor
- May 8 – Marge Kõrkjas, Estonian swimmer
- May 9 – Brian Deegan, American motocross racer
- May 10
  - Liu Fang, Chinese pipa player
  - Sylvain Wiltord, French footballer
- May 11 – Simon Aspelin, Swedish tennis player
- May 14 – Chantal Kreviazuk, Canadian singer-songwriter
- May 16 – Laura Pausini, Italian singer
- May 17
  - Andrea Corr, Irish singer
  - Tamara Rojo, Spanish ballet dancer
- May 18 – Ikke Nurjanah, Indonesian dangdut singer and actress
- May 19
  - Andrew Johns, Australian rugby league player
  - Nawazuddin Siddiqui, Indian film actor
- May 20 – Mikael Stanne, Swedish singer
- May 21 – Fairuza Balk, American actress and musician
- May 22
  - Sean Gunn, American actor
  - Henrietta Ónodi, Hungarian artistic gymnast
- May 23 – Jewel, American singer
- May 26 – Lars Frölander, Swedish swimmer
- May 27
  - Marjorie Taylor Greene, American politician
  - Gürkan Uygun, Turkish actor
- May 28
  - Hans-Jörg Butt, German footballer
  - Misbah-ul-Haq, Pakistani cricketer
- May 29 – Steve Cardenas, American martial artist and actor
  - Stephen Larkham, Australian rugby union player and coach
- May 30 – Big L, American rapper (d. 1999)
- May 31 – Kenan Doğulu, Turkish pop musician

=== June ===
- June 1 – Alanis Morissette, Canadian-American singer
- June 2
  - Gata Kamsky, American chess player
  - M. M. Thahir, Sri Lankan politician
- June 3
  - Kelly Jones, Welsh singer and musician, (Stereophonics)
  - Martín Karpan, Argentinian actor
- June 7
  - Mahesh Bhupathi, Indian tennis player
  - Helen Vollam, Principal Trombone Player for the BBC Symphony Orchestra.
  - Bear Grylls, British survivalist
- June 13
  - Katharina Bellowitsch, Austrian radio and TV presenter.
  - Selma, Icelandic singer
  - Steve-O, American actor
- June 18 – Kenan İmirzalıoğlu, Turkish actor and model
- June 19 – Rossella Erra, Italian television personality
- June 21
  - Natasha Beaumont, Malaysian actress and model
  - Maggie Siff, American actress
  - Hitoshi Uematsu, Japanese short track speed skater
- June 22
  - Devayani, Indian actress
  - Donald Faison, American actor
  - B. V. S. Ravi, Indian writer
  - Tu Tamarua, Cook Islands rugby union flanker
  - Vijay, Indian actor
- June 23
  - Joel Edgerton, Australian actor and filmmaker
  - Kim Young-chul, South Korean comedian and singer
  - Andi Vasluianu, Romanian actor
- June 24
  - Andrea De Cruz, Singaporean actress
  - Ruffa Gutierrez, Filipino model, beauty queen and actress
- June 25
  - Karisma Kapoor, Indian actress
  - Tereza Pergnerová, Czech actress, singer and television presenter
- June 26
  - Derek Jeter, American baseball player
  - Ecija Ojdanić, Croatian actress
  - Nicole Saba, Lebanese singer and actress
  - Kristofer Steen, Swedish musician
  - Matt Striker, American professional wrestler and commentator
- June 27 – Christopher O'Neill, British-American businessman, Swedish royal
- June 28
  - Nelson Mariano II, Filipino chess Grandmaster
  - Rob Dyrdek, American entrepreneur, television personality and former skateboarder
- June 29 – Pua Khein-Seng, Malaysian businessman
- June 30 – Hezekiél Sepeng, South African middle-distance athlete

=== July ===
- July 1
  - Timmy Hung, Hong Kong actor
  - Jefferson Pérez, Ecuadorean race walker
- July 2 – Moon So-ri, South Korean actress, film director and screenwriter
- July 3
  - Taiga Ishikawa, Japanese politician and LGBT activist
  - Marko Milošević, Serbian fugitive and refugee
- July 4
  - Kevin Hanchard, Canadian actor
  - Karole Rocher, French actress
  - Jammi German American football player
- July 6 – Zé Roberto, Brazilian footballer
- July 7 – Jennifer Jones, Canadian curler
- July 8
  - Jeanna Friske, Russian singer, actress, model and socialite (d. 2015)
  - Dragoslav Jevrić, Montenegrin footballer
- July 12
  - Parvin Dabas, Indian actor, model and director
  - Sharon den Adel, Dutch singer
- July 14
  - Martina Hill, German actress, comedian and impersonator
  - David Mitchell, British comedian and actor
- July 16 – Wendell Sailor, Australian rugby league and rugby union player
- July 20 – Doug Ithier, Australian footballer
- July 22
  - Franka Potente, German actress and singer
  - Johnny Strong, American actor
- July 23
  - Maurice Greene, American athlete
  - Stephanie March, American actress
  - Rik Verbrugghe, Belgian road racing cyclist
- July 24
  - Olimpia Ajakaiye, Polish interior designer, actress and television presenter
  - Eva Aridjis, Mexican-American director and screenwriter
- July 25 – Lauren Faust, American animator
- July 26 – Daniel Negreanu, Canadian poker player
- July 28
  - Elizabeth Berkley, American actress
  - Alexis Tsipras, Greek politician
- July 29 – Josh Radnor, American actor
- July 30 – Hilary Swank, American actress
- July 31 – Emilia Fox, English actress

=== August ===
- August 5 – Kajol, Indian actress
- August 6
  - Todd Blanche, American attorney and prosecutor, Acting U.S. Attorney General
  - Ever Carradine, American actress
- August 7 – Michael Shannon, American actor
- August 9 – Derek Fisher, American basketball player
- August 13 – Niklas Sundin, Swedish musician
- August 14 – Christopher Gorham, American actor
- August 15 – Natasha Henstridge, Canadian actress and model
- August 16
  - Didier Cuche, Swiss alpine skier
  - Krisztina Egerszegi, Hungarian swimmer
- August 20
  - Amy Adams, American actress
  - Misha Collins, American actor
  - Deborah Gravenstijn, Brazilian judoka
  - Maxim Vengerov, Russian-Israeli violinist
- August 22
  - Cory Gardner, American politician
  - Jenna Leigh Green, American actress and singer
  - Lee Sheppard, Australian cartoonist
- August 23
  - Ray Park, Scottish actor and martial artist
  - Ovi, Romanian-Norwegian singer-songwriter, producer and musician
  - Shifty Shellshock, American rapper, singer-songwriter and vocalist (d. 2024)
- August 24 – Jennifer Lien, American actress
- August 28 – Carsten Jancker, German footballer

=== September ===
- September 3 – Jen Royle, American sports reporter and chef
- September 4 – Carmit Bachar, American singer
- September 6
  - Tim Henman, English tennis player
  - Nina Persson, Swedish singer
- September 9 – Leah O'Brien, American softball player
- September 10
  - Mirko Filipović, Croatian kickboxer; mixed martial arts fighter
  - Ryan Phillippe, American actor
  - Ben Wallace, American basketball player
- September 12
  - Kenichi Suzumura, Japanese voice actor
- September 14 – Hicham El Guerrouj, Moroccan athlete
- September 15 – Wael Kfoury, Lebanese singer, musician, and songwriter
- September 16 – Loona, Dutch singer
- September 17
  - Austin St. John, American actor and martial artist
  - Rasheed Wallace, American basketball player
- September 18
  - Sol Campbell, English footballer
  - Xzibit, American rapper
- September 19
  - Jimmy Fallon, American actor, comedian, and television personality
  - Hidetaka Miyazaki, Japanese video game designer and executive
  - Victoria Silvstedt, Swedish model
- September 20 – Jon Bernthal, American actor
- September 23 – Matt Hardy, American professional wrestler
- September 24 – Kati Wolf, Hungarian singer
- September 26 – Joo Jin-mo, South Korean actor
- September 28 – Shane Webcke, Australian rugby league player
- September 30 – Yul Bürkle, Venezuelan actor and model

=== October ===
- October 1 – Freddie Mwila Jr., Zambian fooballer (d. 2009)
- October 2 – Rachana Banerjee, Indian film actress
- October 3 – Marianne Timmer, Dutch speed skater
- October 6 – Hoàng Xuân Vinh, Vietnamese sports shooter
- October 7
  - Shannon MacMillan, American soccer player
  - Charlotte Perrelli, Swedish singer
- October 8 – Koji Murofushi, Japanese hammer thrower
- October 10
  - Dale Earnhardt Jr., American race car driver
  - Oded Kattash, Israeli basketball player and coach
  - Chris Pronger, Canadian hockey player
- October 11 – Jason Arnott, Canadian hockey player
- October 13 – Nimal Lanza, Sri Lankan politician, MP and cabinet minister
- October 14 – Shaggy 2 Dope, American rapper
- October 15 – Cayetana Álvarez de Toledo, Spanish politician
- October 16
  - Aurela Gaçe, Albanian singer
  - Paul Kariya, Canadian hockey player
- October 17 – Matthew Macfadyen, English actor
- October 18
  - Susana Díaz, Spanish politician
  - Zhou Xun, Chinese actress and singer
- October 23
  - Aravind Adiga, Indian-Australian author
  - Sander Westerveld, Dutch soccer player
- October 24 – Catherine Sutherland, Australian actress
- October 25 – Nevenka Fernández, Spanish economist.
- October 28
  - Nelly Ciobanu, Moldovan singer
  - Joaquin Phoenix, American actor born in Puerto Rico
- October 29
  - Akashdeep Saigal, Indian television actor and model
  - Yenny Wahid, Indonesian activist and politician

=== November ===
- November 2 – Nelly, American rapper
- November 5
  - Ryan Adams, American singer and songwriter
  - Dado Pršo, Croatian footballer
  - Jerry Stackhouse, American basketball player
- November 8
  - Penelope Heyns, South African swimmer
  - Masashi Kishimoto, Japanese manga author
  - Matthew Rhys, Welsh actor
- November 9 – Alessandro Del Piero, Italian football player
- November 10 – Chris Lilley, Australian comedian and actor
- November 11 – Leonardo DiCaprio, American actor, producer and environmentalist
- November 13 – Kerim Seiler, Swiss artist and architect
- November 14 – Chip Gaines, an American actor, producer, television personality, and author
- November 15
  - Chad Kroeger, Canadian singer
  - Ingrida Šimonytė, Prime Minister of Lithuania
- November 16 – Paul Scholes, English football player
- November 18
  - Chloë Sevigny, American actress
  - Petter Solberg, Norwegian rally driver
- November 20
  - Drew Ginn, Australian rower
  - Kurt Krömer, German television presenter, comedian and actor
- November 24 – Stephen Merchant, English actor and comedian
- November 26 – Roman Šebrle, Czech decathlete
- November 27
  - Wendy Houvenaghel, British racing cyclist
  - Zsófia Polgár, Hungarian-born chess player
- November 29 – Ferenc Merkli, Hungarian Slovene priest, writer and translator
- November 30 – Wallace Chung, Hong Kong actor and singer

=== December ===
- December 1 – Costinha, Portuguese footballer
- December 4 – Anke Huber, German tennis player
- December 5
  - Kid Koala, Canadian DJ, turntablist, musician and graphic novelist
  - Ben McAdams, American politician who served in the United States House of Representatives from 2019 to 2021 in Utah
- December 7 – Nicole Appleton, Canadian singer
- December 10 – Meg White, American drummer
- December 11
  - Rey Mysterio, American wrestler
  - Gete Wami, Ethiopian long-distance runner
  - Ben Shephard, TV presenter and journalist
- December 12 – Michelle Saram, Singaporean singer and actress
- December 13 - Nick McCarthy, English-German guitarist singer (Franz Ferdinand)
- December 17
  - Sarah Paulson, American actress
  - Giovanni Ribisi, American actor
- December 18
  - Kari Byron, American artist and television personality
  - Mutassim Gaddafi, Libyan Army commander (d. 2011)
  - Viki Miljković, Serbian singer
  - Nelly Karim, Egyptian actress
- December 19 – Ricky Ponting, Australian cricketer
- December 20 – Paul Linger, English footballer
- December 24
  - Marcelo Salas, Chilean footballer
  - Ryan Seacrest, American television personality
  - Paal Nilssen-Love, Norwegian drummer and composer
- December 27
  - Alena Vinnitskaya, Ukrainian singer
  - Fumiko Orikasa, Japanese voice actress
- December 29 – Mekhi Phifer, American actor
- December 30
  - Dr. Jitheshji, Indian Speed Cartoonist and Pictorial Orator
- December 31
  - Tan Tolga Demirci, Turkish director and writer
  - Tony Kanaan, Brazilian racing driver

== Deaths ==
=== January ===
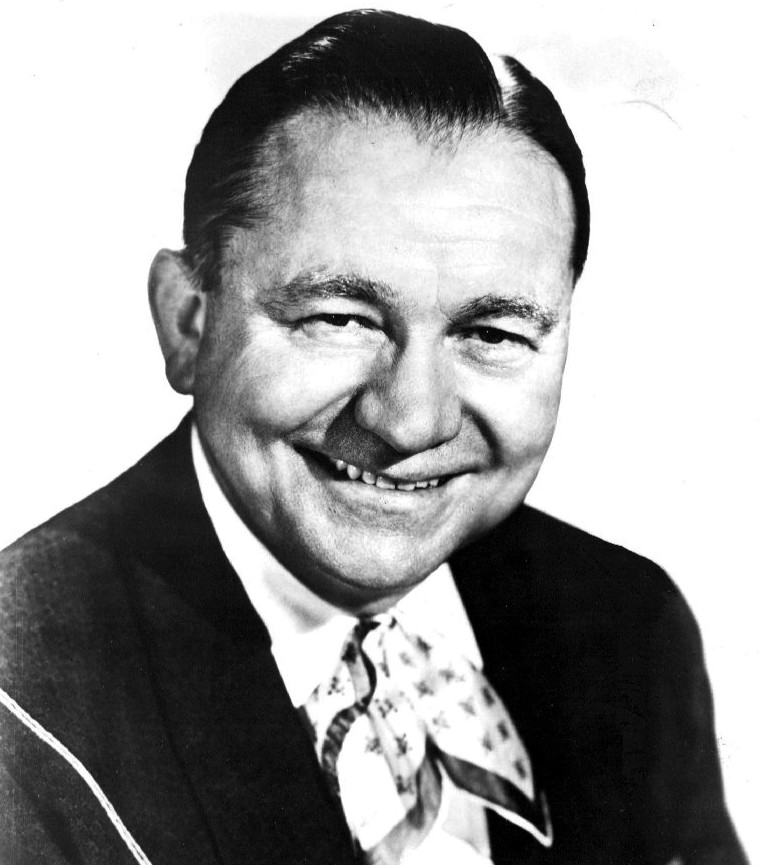
Tex Ritter

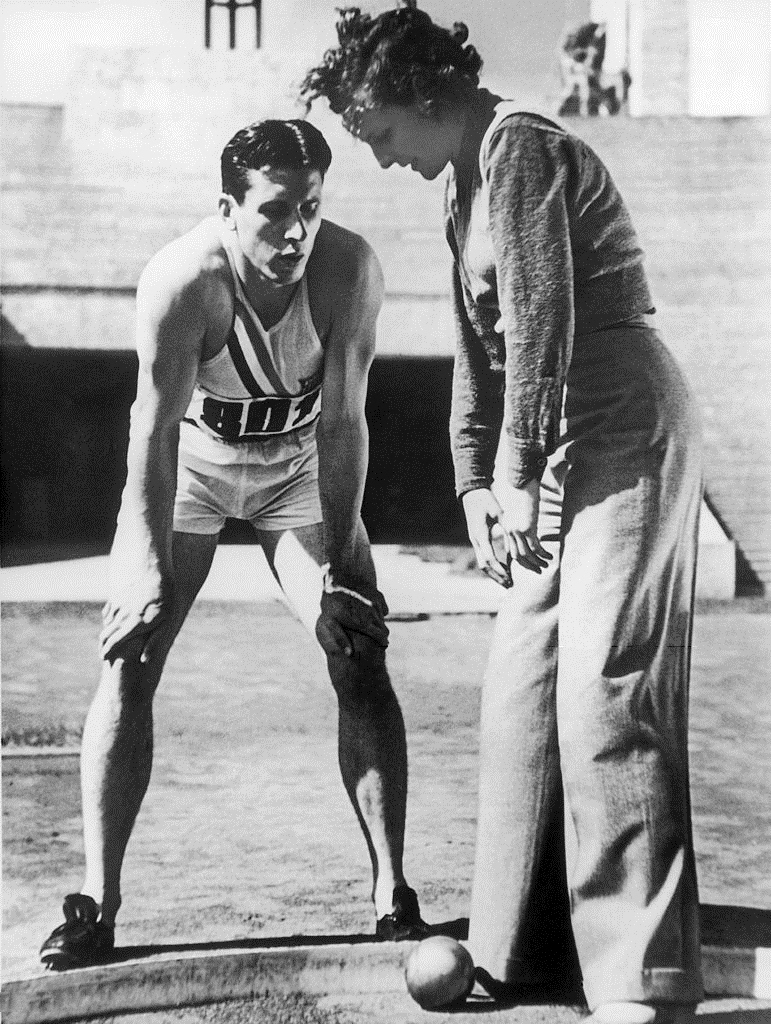
Glenn Morris

- January 2 – Tex Ritter, American actor and country musician (b. 1905)
- January 3 – Gino Cervi, Italian actor (b. 1901)
- January 4 - David Yaras, Chicagoan mobster.
- January 6
  - David Alfaro Siqueiros, Mexican painter and muralist (b. 1896)
  - Margit Slachta, Hungarian politician (b. 1884)
- January 12 – Princess Patricia of Connaught (b. 1886)
- January 18 – Bill Finger, American comic strip and book writer (b. 1914)
- January 21 – Lewis Strauss, American businessman, philanthropist, and naval officer (b. 1896)
- January 22 – Oskar Herman, Croatian Jewish painter (b. 1886)
- January 27
  - Georgios Grivas, Greek-Cypriot colonel (b. 1897)
  - Leo Geyr von Schweppenburg, German general (b. 1886)
- January 29 – H. E. Bates, English writer and author (b. 1905)
- January 30 – Murray Chotiner, American political consultant (b. 1909)
- January 31
  - Samuel Goldwyn, Polish-born American film studio executive (b. 1879)
  - Glenn Morris, American Olympic athlete (b. 1912)

=== February ===
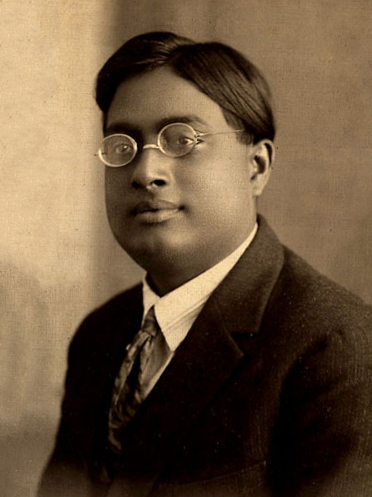
Satyendra Nath Bose

- February 4
  - Satyendra Nath Bose, Indian mathematician and physicist (b. 1894)
  - Stuart Buchanan, American actor (d. 1894)
- February 8 – Fritz Zwicky, Swiss physicist and astronomer (b. 1898)
- February 11 – Anna Q. Nilsson, Swedish-born American silent film star (b. 1888)
- February 13 – Amir Khan, Indian classical vocal singer (b. 1912)
- February 15
  - Kurt Atterberg, Swedish composer (b. 1887)
  - George W. Snedecor, American mathematician and statistician (b. 1881)
- February 18 – Manuel A. Odría, 79th President of Peru (b. 1896)
- February 21 – Tim Horton, Canadian ice hockey player and co-founder of the Tim Hortons restaurant chain (b. 1930)
- February 23
  - Harry Ruby, American musician, composer and writer (b. 1895)
  - George Van Biesbroeck, American-born Belgian astronomer (b. 1880)
- February 24 – Robert A. Stemmle, German screenwriter and film director (b. 1903)

=== March ===
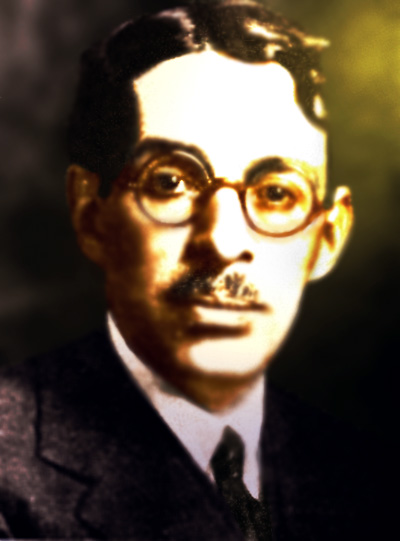
Eduardo Santos Montejo

- March 1 – Bobby Timmons, American jazz pianist and composer (b. 1935)
- March 3
  - Barbara Ruick, American actress and singer (b. 1932)
  - Frank Wilcox, American actor (b. 1907)
- March 4 – Adolph Gottlieb, American abstract expressionist painter (b. 1903)
- March 5 – Billy De Wolfe, American actor (b. 1907)
- March 6 – Ernest Becker, American anthropologist and writer (b. 1924)
- March 8 – Martha Wentworth, American actress (b. 1889)
- March 9 – Earl Wilbur Sutherland Jr., American physiologist, Nobel Prize laureate (b. 1915)
- March 17 – Louis Kahn, Russian-born American architect (b. 1901)
- March 19 – Edward Platt, American actor known as "The Chief" on NBC/CBS's Get Smart (b. 1916)
- March 20
  - Chet Huntley, American television reporter (b. 1911)
  - Bob Ross, American racing driver (b. 1914)
- March 21 – Candy Darling, American actress (b. 1944)
- March 22 – Peter Revson, American race car driver (b. 1939)
- March 27 – Eduardo Santos Montejo, Colombian publisher and politician, 15th President of Colombia (b. 1888)
- March 28 – Dorothy Fields, American librettist and lyricist (b. 1904)
- March 29 – Andrea Checchi, Italian actor (La ciociara) (b. 1916)

=== April ===
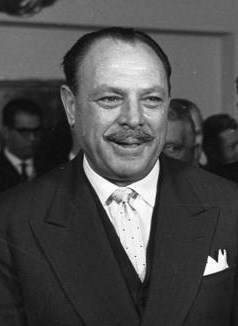
Ayub Khan

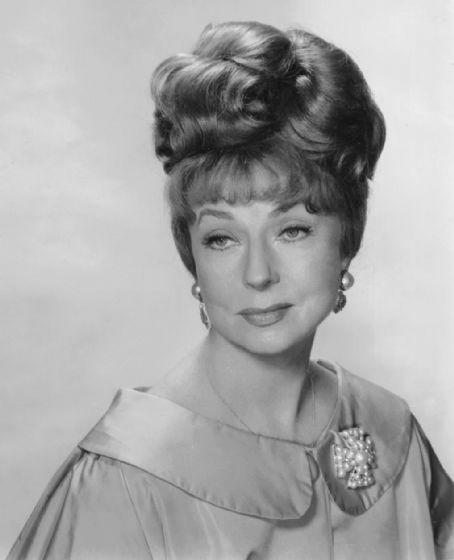
Agnes Moorehead

- April 2
  - Georges Pompidou, 100th Prime Minister of France and 19th President of France, Co-Prince of Andorra (b. 1911)
  - Douglass Dumbrille, Canadian actor (b. 1889)
- April 5 – A. Y. Jackson, Canadian painter and a founding member of the Group of Seven (b. 1882)
- April 6 – Willem Marinus Dudok, Dutch modernist architect (b. 1884)
- April 8 – K. A. C. Creswell, English architectural historian (b. 1879)
- April 10 – Patricia Collinge, Irish-born American actress (b. 1892)
- April 14 – Howard Pease, American adventure novelist (b. 1894)
- April 18
  - Betty Compson, American actress (b. 1897)
  - Marcel Pagnol, French novelist (b. 1895)
- April 19 – Ayub Khan, Pakistani general and politician, 2nd President of Pakistan (b. 1907)
- April 20 – Peter Lee Lawrence, German actor (b. 1944)
- April 24
  - Bud Abbott, American comedian (b. 1895)
  - Franz Jonas, Austrian political figure, 7th President of Austria (b. 1899)
- April 30 – Agnes Moorehead, American actress (b. 1900)

=== May ===
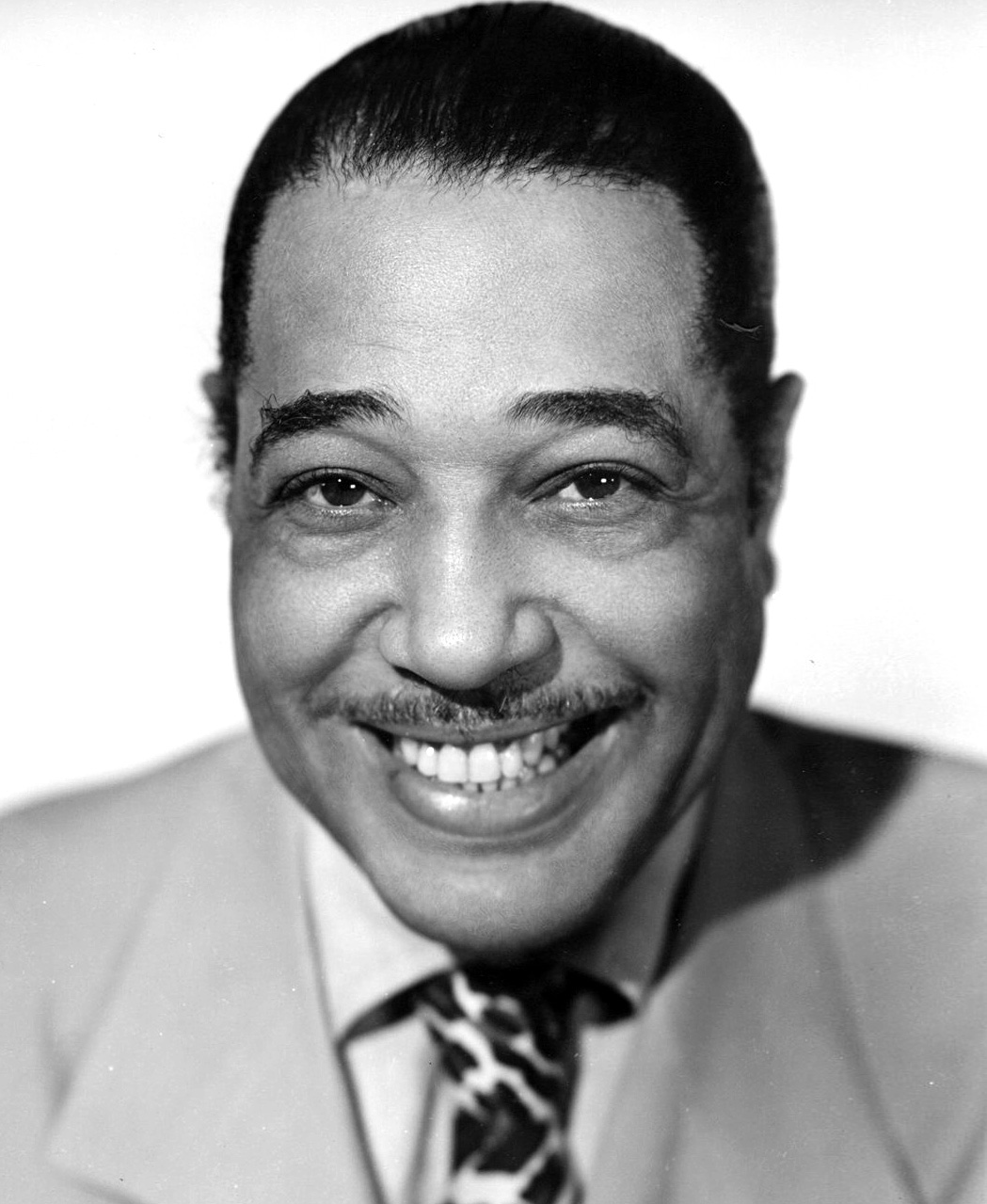
Duke Ellington

- May 7 – Fred Kelly, American Olympic athlete (b. 1891)
- May 10 – Takeshi Sakamoto, Japanese actor (b. 1899)
- May 13 – Jaime Torres Bodet, Mexican public servant, 2nd Director-General of the UNESCO (b. 1902)
- May 14 – Jacob L. Moreno, Romanian-American psychiatrist and psychosociologist (b. 1889)
- May 15 – Guy Simonds, Canadian Lieutenant-General, commander of the Canadian Armed Forces in World War II (b. 1903)
- May 18 – Sir Harry Ricardo, English mechanical engineer (b. 1885)
- May 19 – Allal al-Fassi, Moroccan politician, poet, writer and scholar (b. 1910)
- May 20 – Jean Daniélou, French Catholic cardinal, theologian and academic (b. 1905)
- May 21 – Lily Kronberger, Hungarian figure skater (b. 1890)
- May 24 – Duke Ellington, American jazz pianist and bandleader (b. 1899)
- May 25 – Donald Crisp, English-American actor, film director, screenwriter and producer (b. 1882)

=== June ===
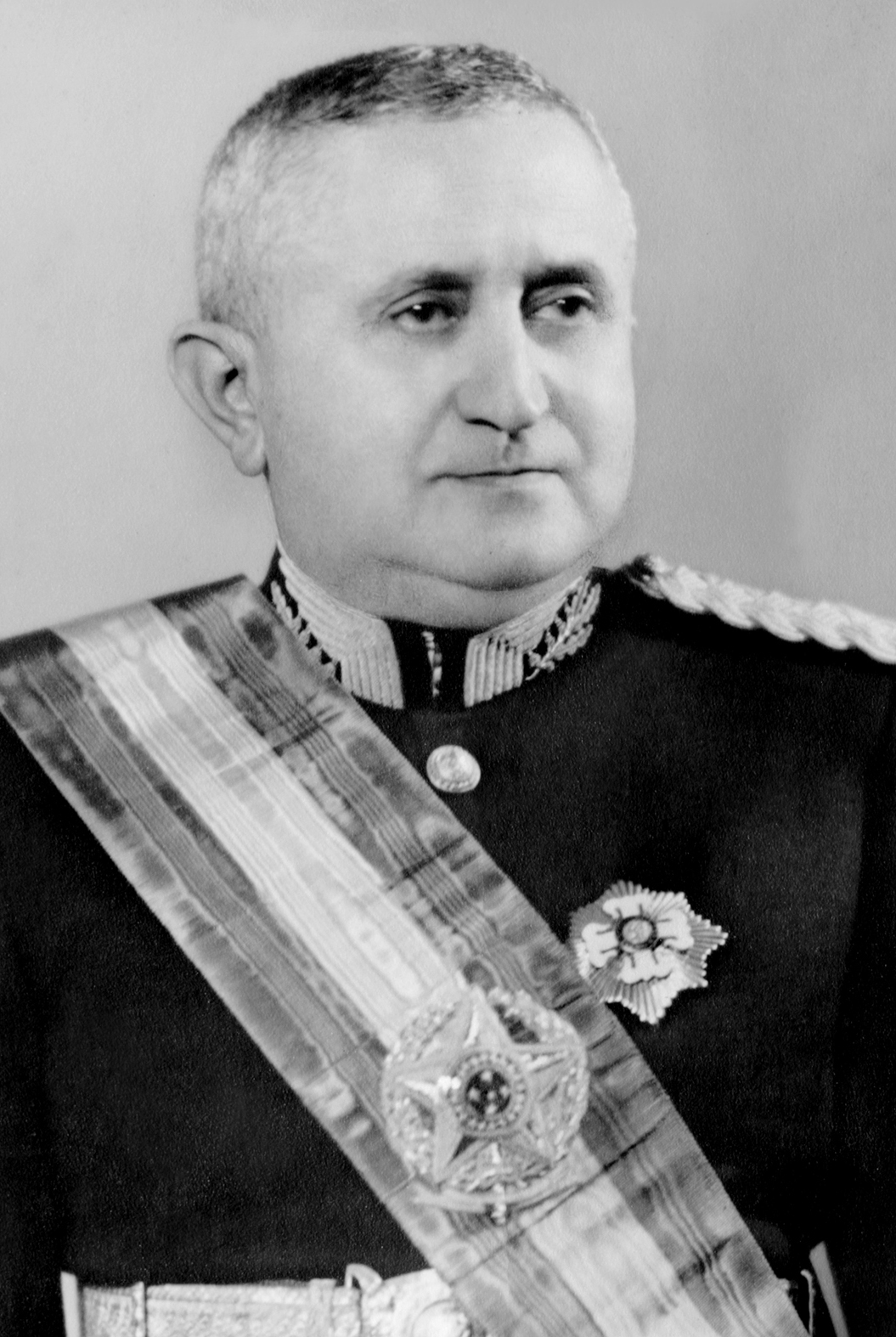
Eurico Gaspar Dutra

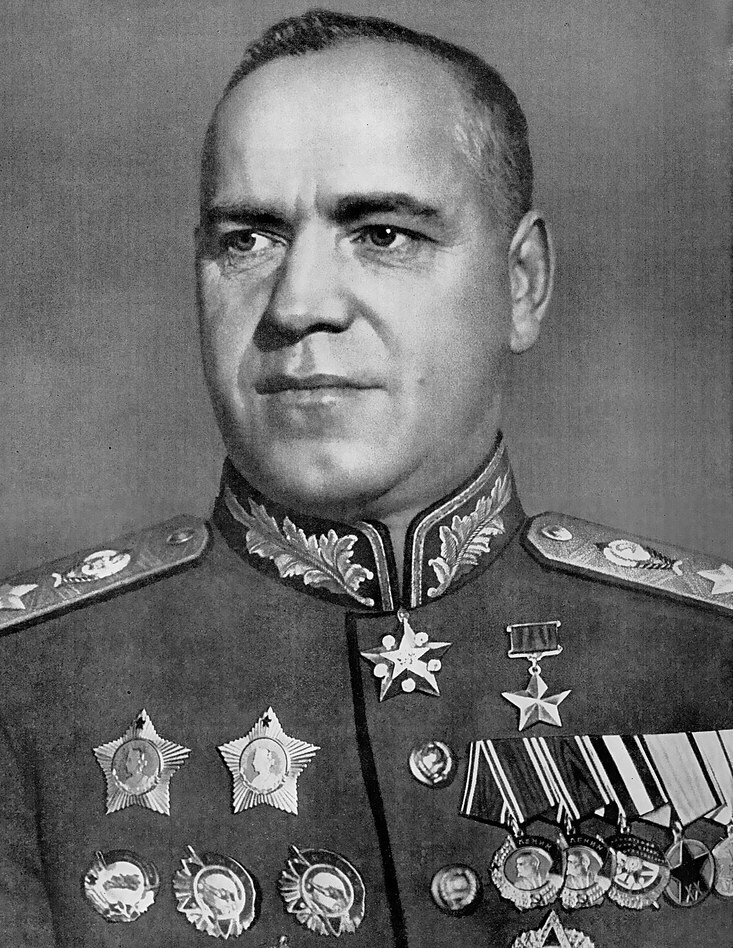
Georgy Zhukov

- June 3 – Rashid Nezhmetdinov, Soviet chess player (b. 1912)
- June 4 – Mamerto Urriolagoitía, 43rd President of Bolivia (b. 1895)
- June 9
  - Miguel Ángel Asturias, Guatemalan writer, Nobel Prize laureate (b. 1899)
  - Katharine Cornell, German-born, American stage actress, writer, theatre owner, and producer (b. 1893)
  - Carlo Pisacane, Italian actor (b. 1889)
- June 10 – Prince Henry, Duke of Gloucester, 11th Governor-General of Australia (b. 1900)
- June 11
  - Eurico Gaspar Dutra, Brazilian marshal and 16th President of Brazil (b. 1883)
  - Julius Evola, Italian philosopher (b. 1898)
  - Georgann Hawkins, American high school student (b. 1955)
- June 12 – André Marie, French Radical politician, 65th Prime Minister of France (b. 1897)
- June 14 – Knud Jeppesen, Danish musicologist, composer, and songwriter (b. 1892)
- June 16 – Amalie Sara Colquhoun, Australian painter (b. 1894)
- June 17 – Pamela Britton, American actress (b. 1923)
- June 18 – Georgy Zhukov, Soviet Army marshal and Minister of Defence (b. 1896)
- June 22 – Darius Milhaud, French composer (b. 1892)
- June 25 – Cornelius Lanczos, Hungarian mathematician and physicist (b. 1893)
- June 26 – Ernest Gruening, American journalist, Governor of Alaska Territory from 1939 to 1953, and United States Senator from 1959 to 1969 (b. 1887)
- June 28
  - Vannevar Bush, American engineer, inventor and science administrator (b. 1890)
  - Frank Sutton, American actor (b. 1923)
- June 29 – José Maria Ferreira de Castro, Portuguese writer and journalist (b. 1898)
- June 30 – Alberta Williams King, American civil rights organizer (b. 1903)

=== July ===
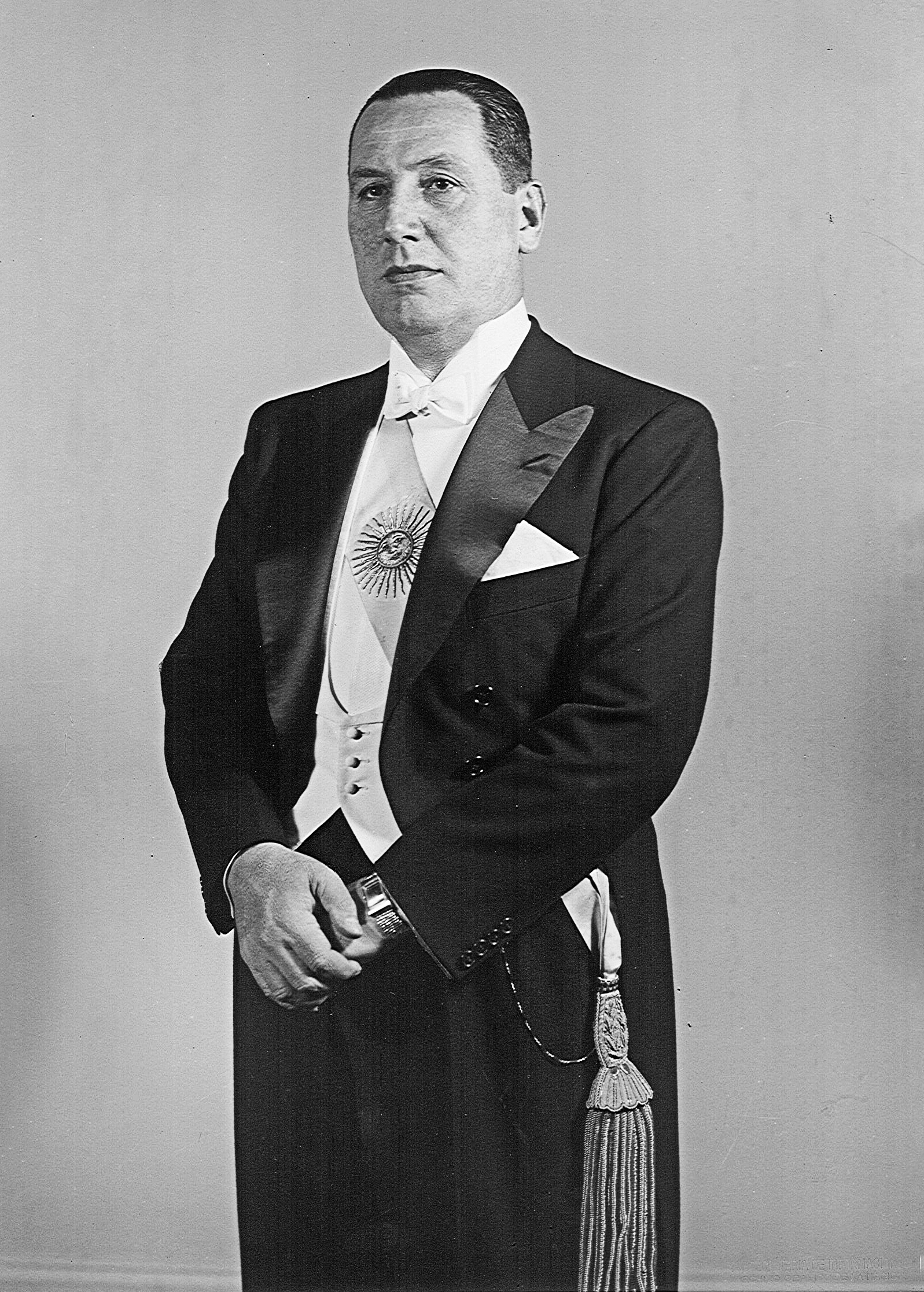
Juan Perón

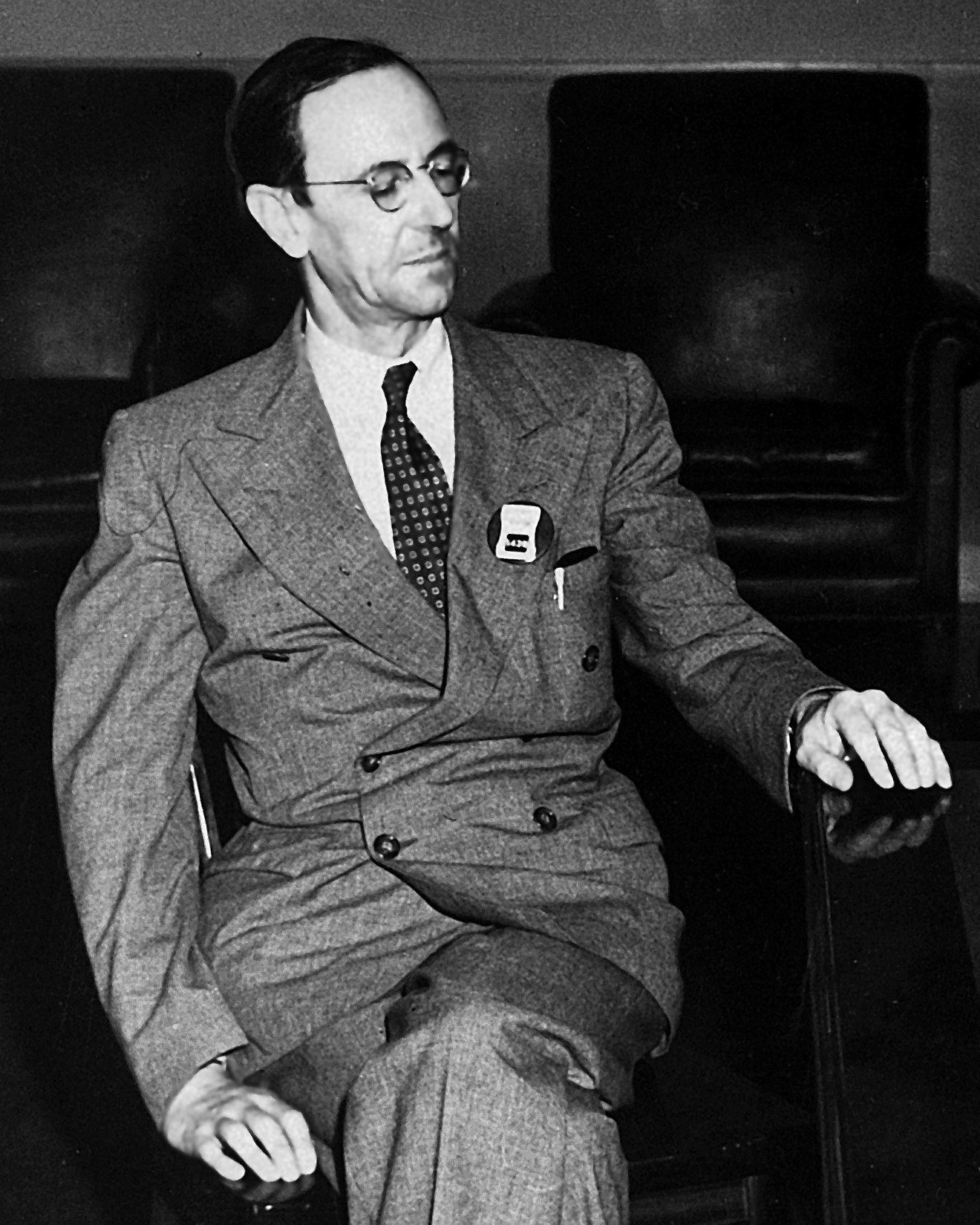
Sir James Chadwick

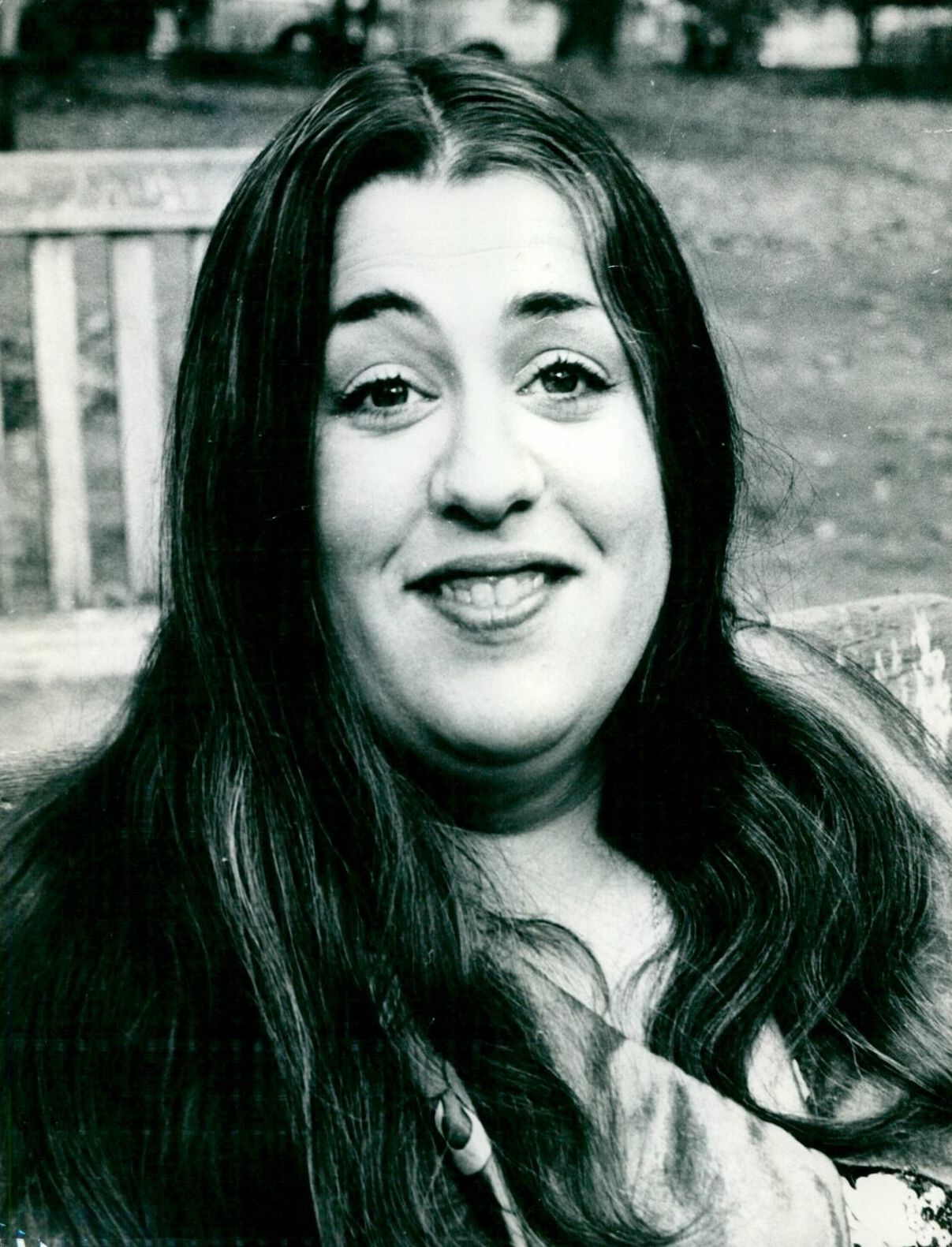
Cass Elliot

- July 1 – Juan Perón, Argentine army general and politician, 2-time President of Argentina (b. 1895)
- July 4 – Georgette Heyer, British writer (b. 1902)
- July 7 – Leon Shamroy, American cinematographer (b. 1901)
- July 8
  - Margaret Furse, British costume designer (b. 1911)
  - Deborah Gail Stone, Disneyland Employee (b. 1956)
- July 9 – Earl Warren, American jurist and politician, Chief Justice of the United States Supreme Court (b. 1891)
- July 11 – Pär Lagerkvist, Swedish writer, Nobel Prize laureate (b. 1891)
- July 13
  - Patrick Blackett, British physicist, Nobel Prize laureate (b. 1897)
  - Prince Christian of Schaumburg-Lippe (b. 1898)
- July 14 – Carl Spaatz, U.S. Air Force general (b. 1891)
- July 15 – Christine Chubbuck, American TV personality (b. 1944)
- July 17
  - Dizzy Dean, American baseball player (St. Louis Cardinals) and a member of the MLB Hall of Fame (b. 1910)
  - Piotr Kałwa, Polish Roman Catholic prelate, bishop of Lublin (b. 1893)
  - Edith Alice Macia, Arizona pioneer, postmaster, and undercover FBI agent (b. 1884)
- July 19 –
  - Joe Flynn, American actor (b. 1924)
  - Stefano Magaddino, America mafia boss.
- July 22 – Wayne Morse, American lawyer, politician, and United States Senator from Oregon (1945–1969) (b. 1900)
- July 24
  - Sir James Chadwick, British physicist, Nobel Prize laureate (b. 1891)
- July 29
  - Cass Elliot, American vocalist (b. 1941)
  - Erich Kästner, German author (b. 1899)
- July 30 – Lev Knipper, Soviet composer (b. 1898)

=== August ===
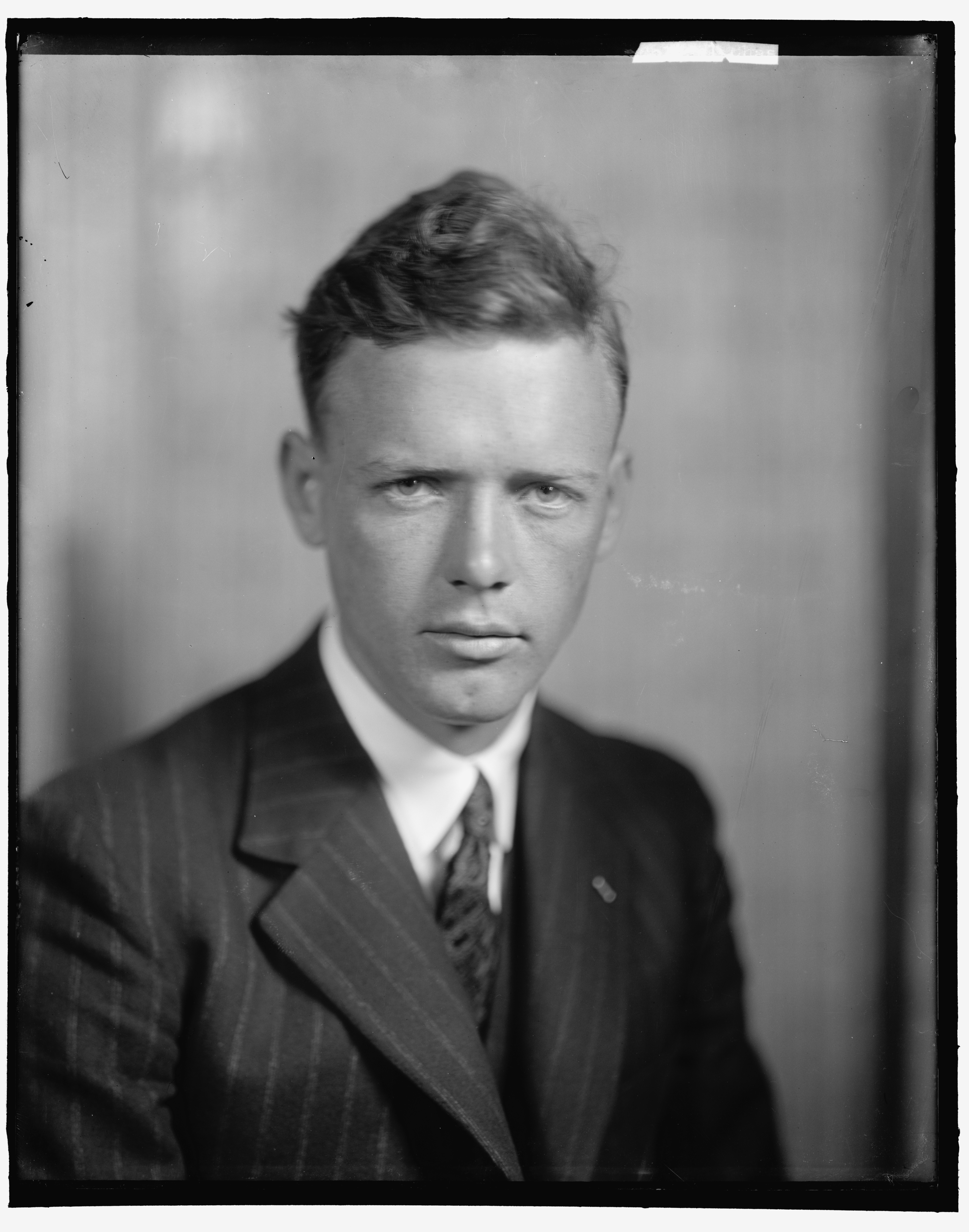
Charles Lindbergh

- August 3 – Edna Murphy, American actress (b. 1899)
- August 7 – Rosario Castellanos, Mexican poet and author (b. 1925)
- August 8 – Baldur von Schirach, Nazi German Hitler Youth leader (b. 1907)
- August 11 – Jan Tschichold, German typographer (b. 1902)
- August 13 – Ida McNeil, American broadcaster and designer of the flag of South Dakota (b. 1888)
- August 15 –
  - Edmund Cobb, American actor (b. 1892)
  - Clay Shaw, American businessman, best known for being the only person brought to trial for involvement in the 1963 assassination of John F. Kennedy.
- August 17 – Aldo Palazzeschi, Italian novelist, poet, journalist and essayist (b. 1885)
- August 22 – Jacob Bronowski, Polish-Jewish British mathematician, biologist and science historian (b. 1908)
- August 23 – Roberto Assagioli, Italian psychiatrist and pioneer (b. 1888)
- August 24 – Alexander P. de Seversky, Russian-American aviation pioneer and inventor (b. 1894)
- August 26 – Charles Lindbergh, American aviator (b. 1902)
- August 27 – Otto Strasser, Nazi German politician (b. 1897)
- August 31
  - Ali bin Abdullah Al Thani, Emir of Qatar (b. 1895)
  - Norman Kirk, New Zealand politician, 29th Prime Minister of New Zealand (b. 1923)

=== September ===
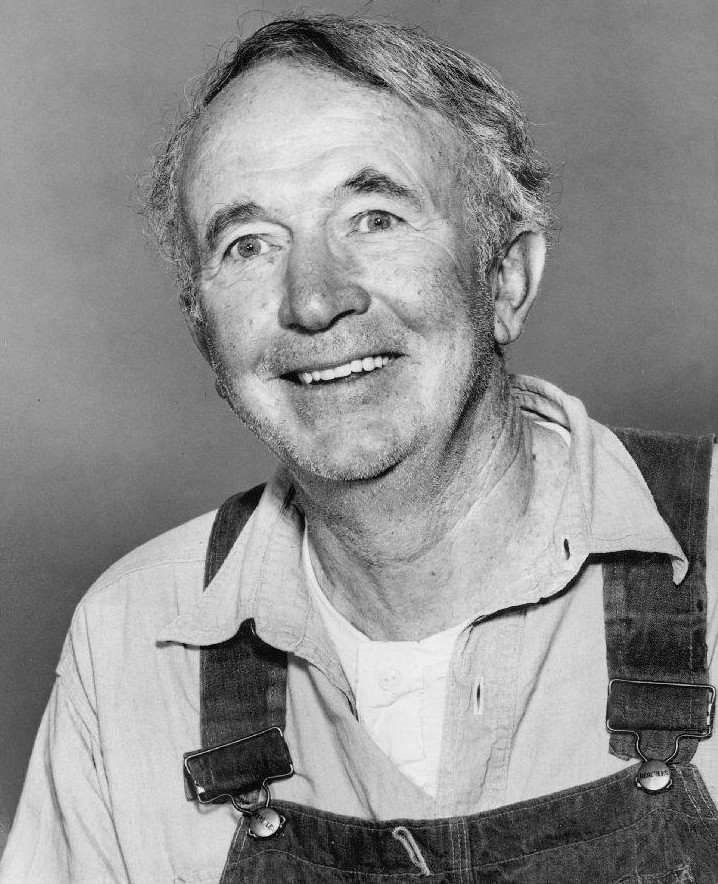
Walter Brennan

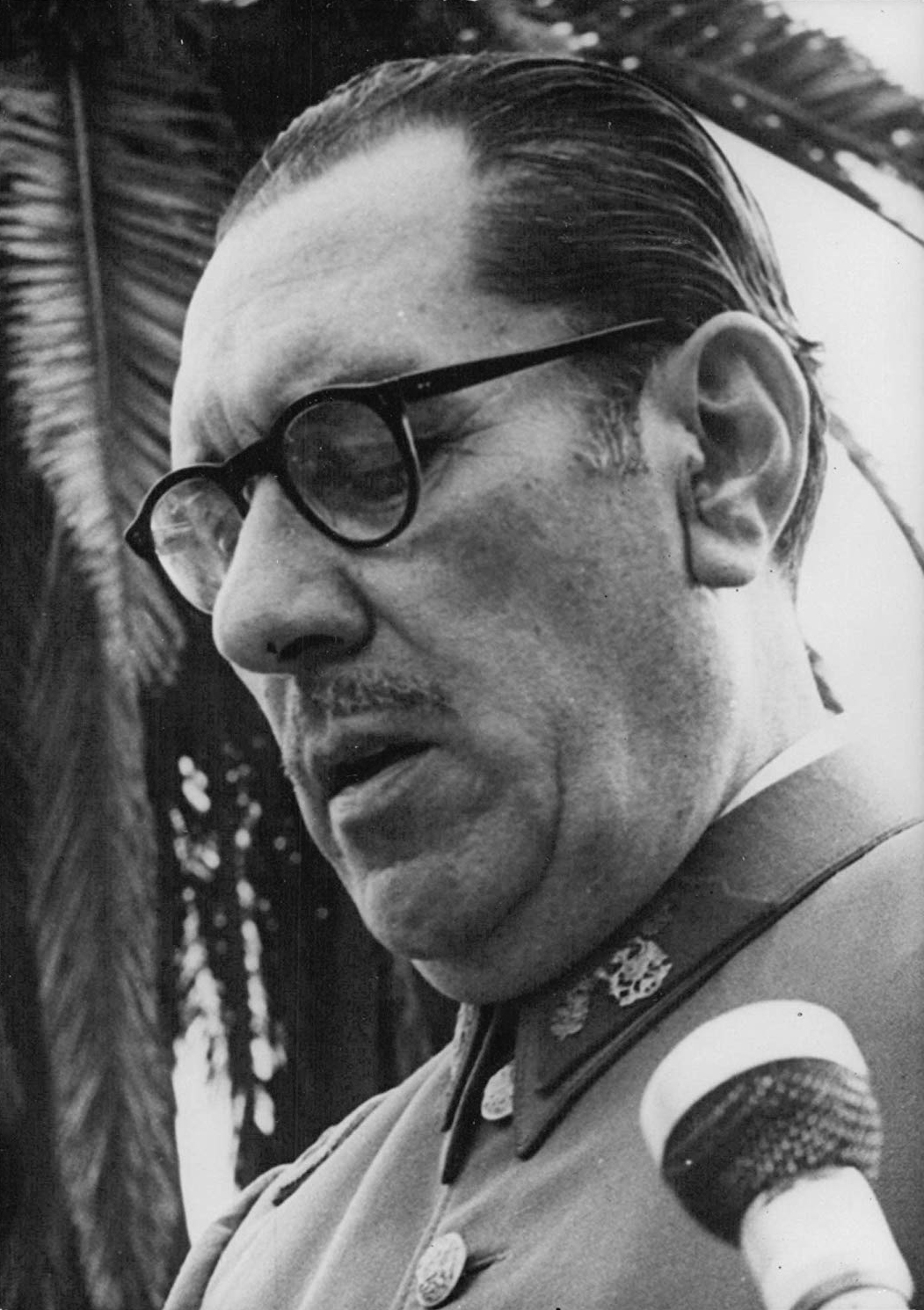
Carlos Prats

- September 3 – Harry Partch, American composer (b. 1901)
- September 4
  - Creighton Abrams, American general (b. 1914)
  - Marcel Achard, French playwright and scriptwriter (b. 1899)
- September 6
  - Olga Baclanova, Soviet stage and screen actress, operatic singer, and ballerina (b. c. 1893)
  - Otto Kruger, American actor (b. 1885)
- September 7 – Juan Antonio Ipiña, Spanish football manager (b. 1912)
- September 10 – Melchior Wańkowicz, Polish army officer, writer, journalist, and publisher (b. 1892)
- September 12 – Prince Nikita Alexandrovich of Russia (b. 1900)
- September 16 – Phog Allen, American basketball and baseball player (b. 1885)
- September 18 – Edna Best, British actress (b. 1900)
- September 20 – José Mojica, Mexican Franciscan friar, tenor and film actor (b. 1896)
- September 21
  - Walter Brennan, American actor (b. 1894)
  - Jacqueline Susann, American writer and actress (b. 1918)
- September 22 – Winfried Otto Schumann, German physicist (b. 1888)
- September 23 – Cliff Arquette, American comedian who created the character Charley Weaver (b. 1905)
- September 26 – Jean Gale, American vaudeville performer (b. 1912)
- September 28 – Arnold Fanck, German film director (b. 1889)
- September 30 – Carlos Prats, Chilean general and politician (assassinated) (b. 1915)

=== October ===
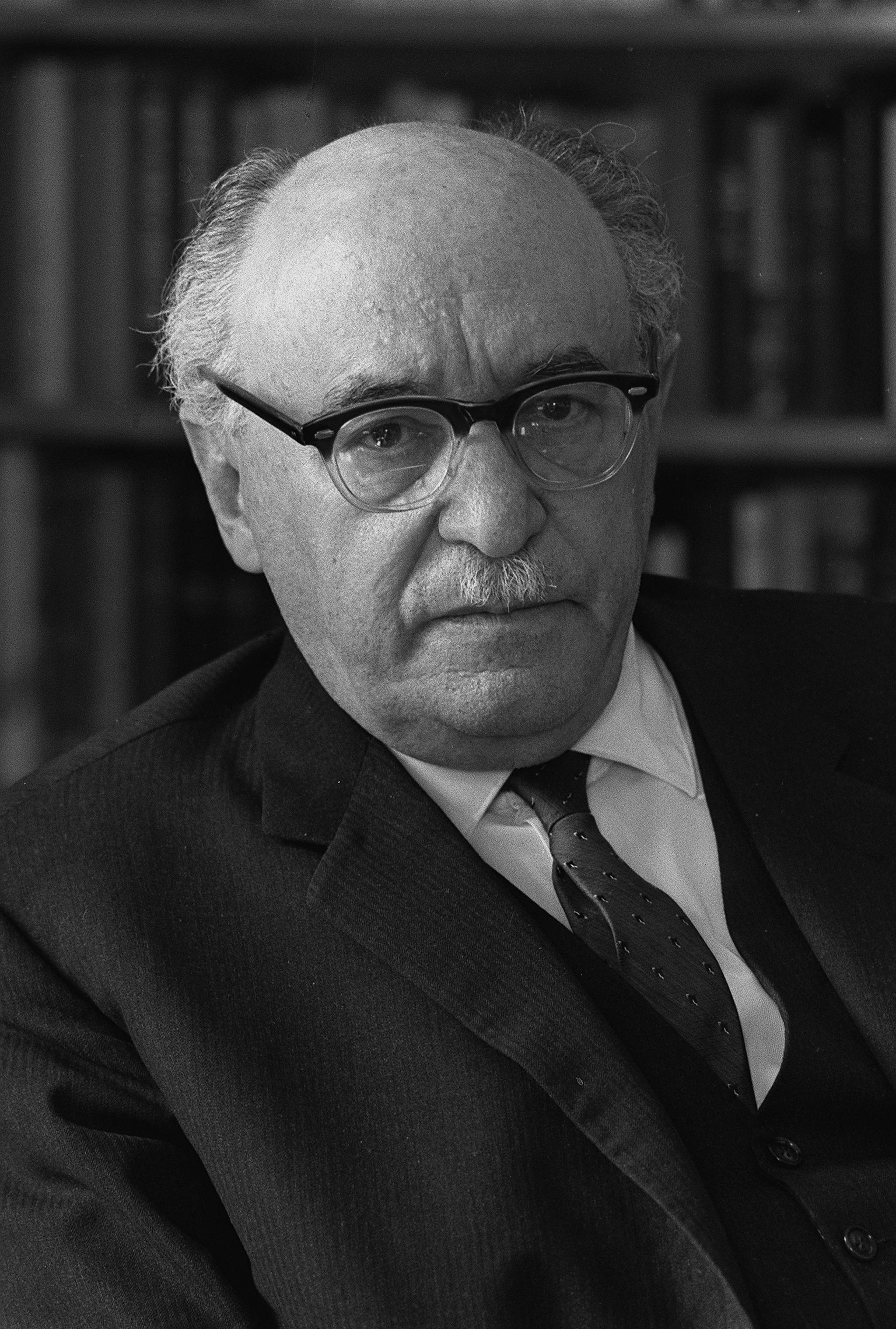
Zalman Shazar

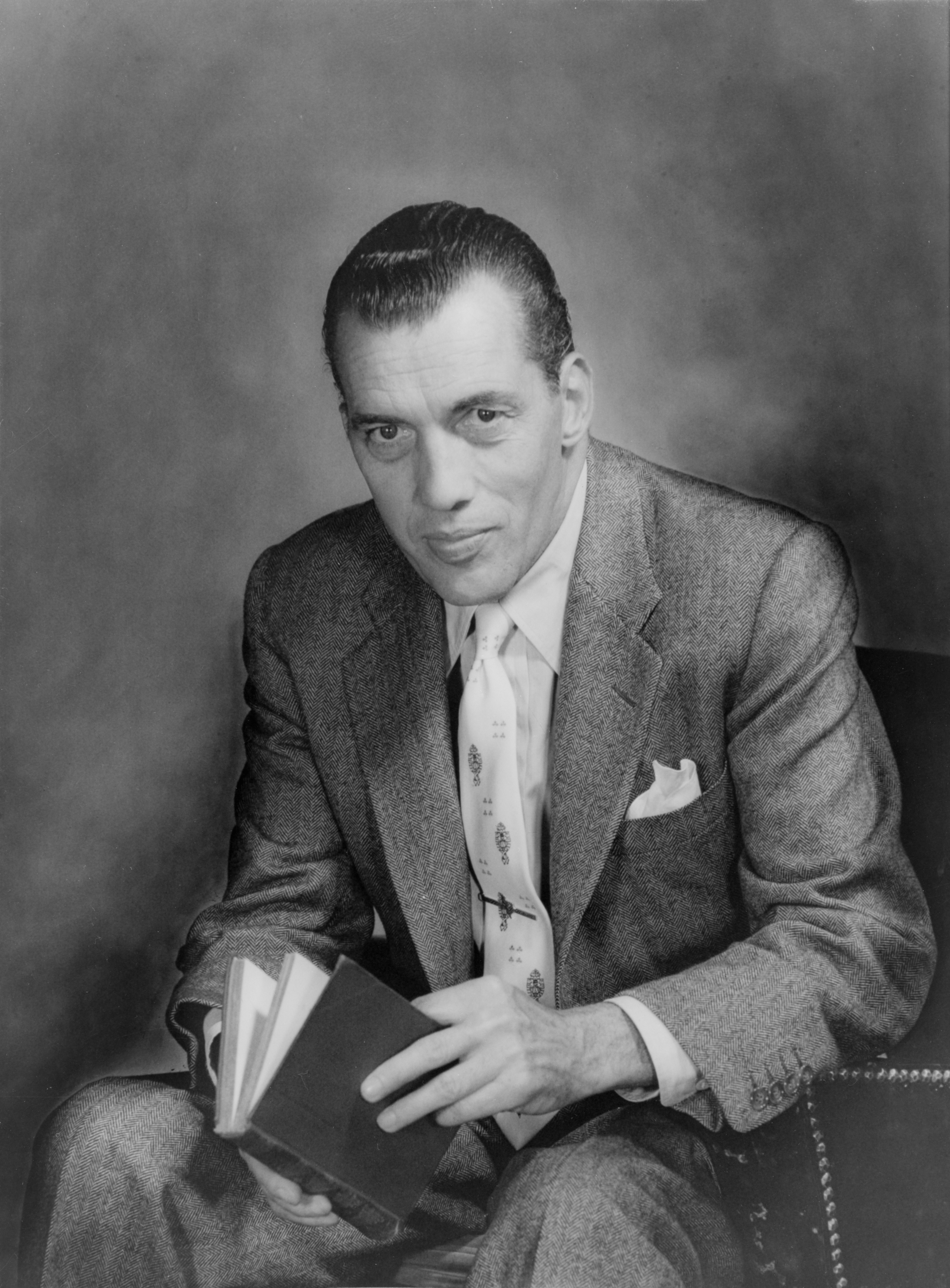
Ed Sullivan

- October 2 – Vasily Shukshin, Soviet actor, writer, screenwriter and director (b. 1929)
- October 4
  - Robert Lee Moore, American mathematician (b. 1882)
  - Anne Sexton, American poet and writer (b. 1928)
- October 5 – Zalman Shazar, 3rd President of Israel (b. 1889)
- October 6 – V. K. Krishna Menon, Indian statesman, diplomat and nationalist (b. 1896)
- October 8 – Harry Carney, American jazz saxophonist (b. 1910)
- October 9 – Oskar Schindler, German businessman and humanitarian (b. 1908)
- October 13
  - Josef Krips, Austrian conductor and violinist (b. 1902)
  - Ed Sullivan, American television host (b. 1901)
- October 14 – Sattar Bahlulzade, Azerbaijani landscape painter (b. 1909)
- October 16 – Vlasta Dekanova, Czechoslovak artistic gymnast (b. 1909)
- October 17 – Tomotaka Tasaka, Japanese film director (b. 1902)
- October 18 – Anders Lange, Norwegian politician (b. 1904)
- October 20 – Élie Lescot, 29th President of Haiti, leader in World War II (b. 1883)
- October 23 – Melchior Lengyel, Hungarian writer, dramatist and film screenwriter (b. 1880)
- October 24 – David Oistrakh, Ukrainian violinist (b. 1908)
- October 26 – Bidia Dandaron, Soviet Buddhist author and teacher (b. 1914)
- October 27 – Paul Frankeur, French actor (b. 1905)
- October 30 – Begum Akhtar, Indian singer (b. 1914)
- October 31 – Mikheil Chiaureli, Soviet Georgian filmmaker (b. 1894)

=== November ===
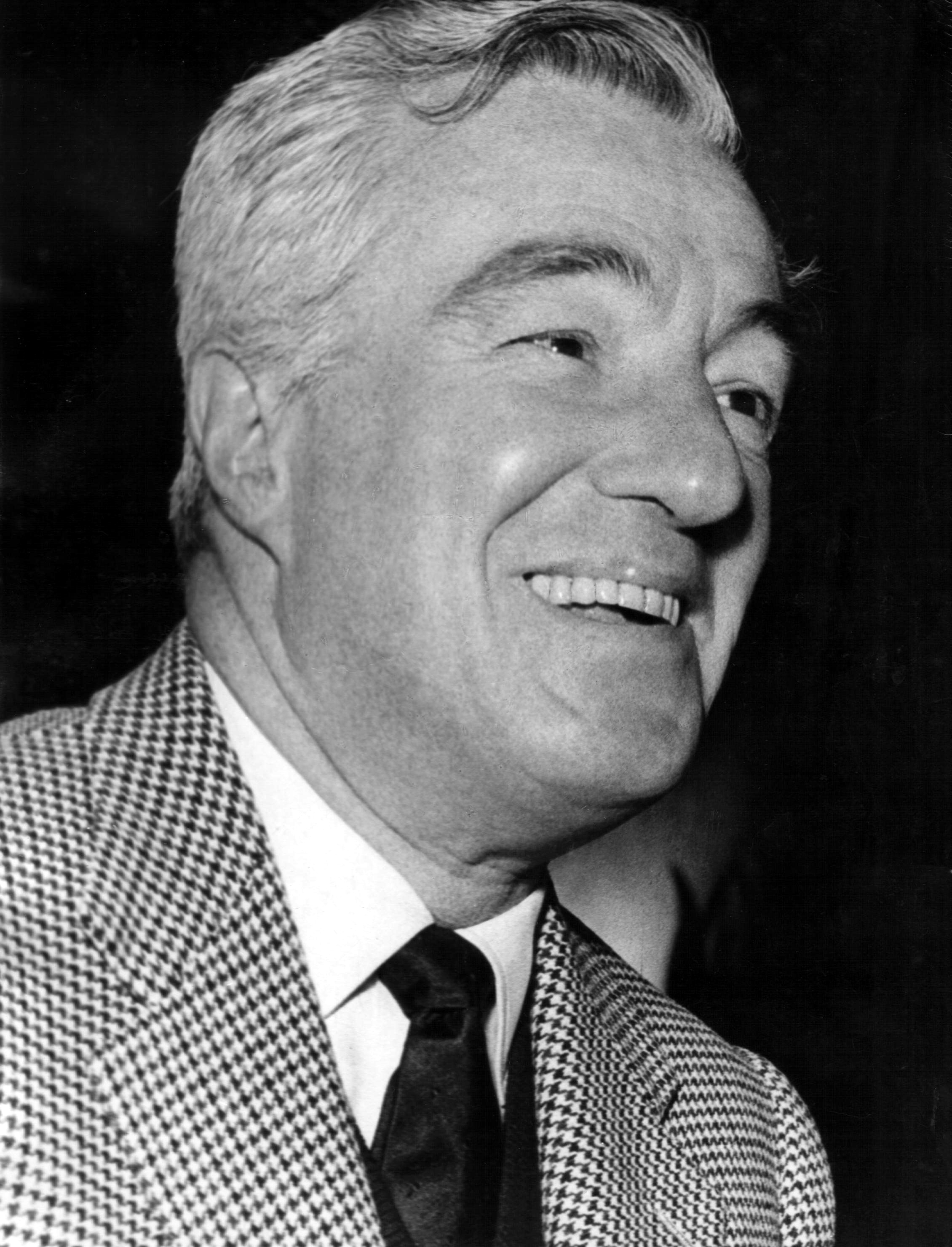
Vittorio De Sica

Robert Hugo, Duke of Parma

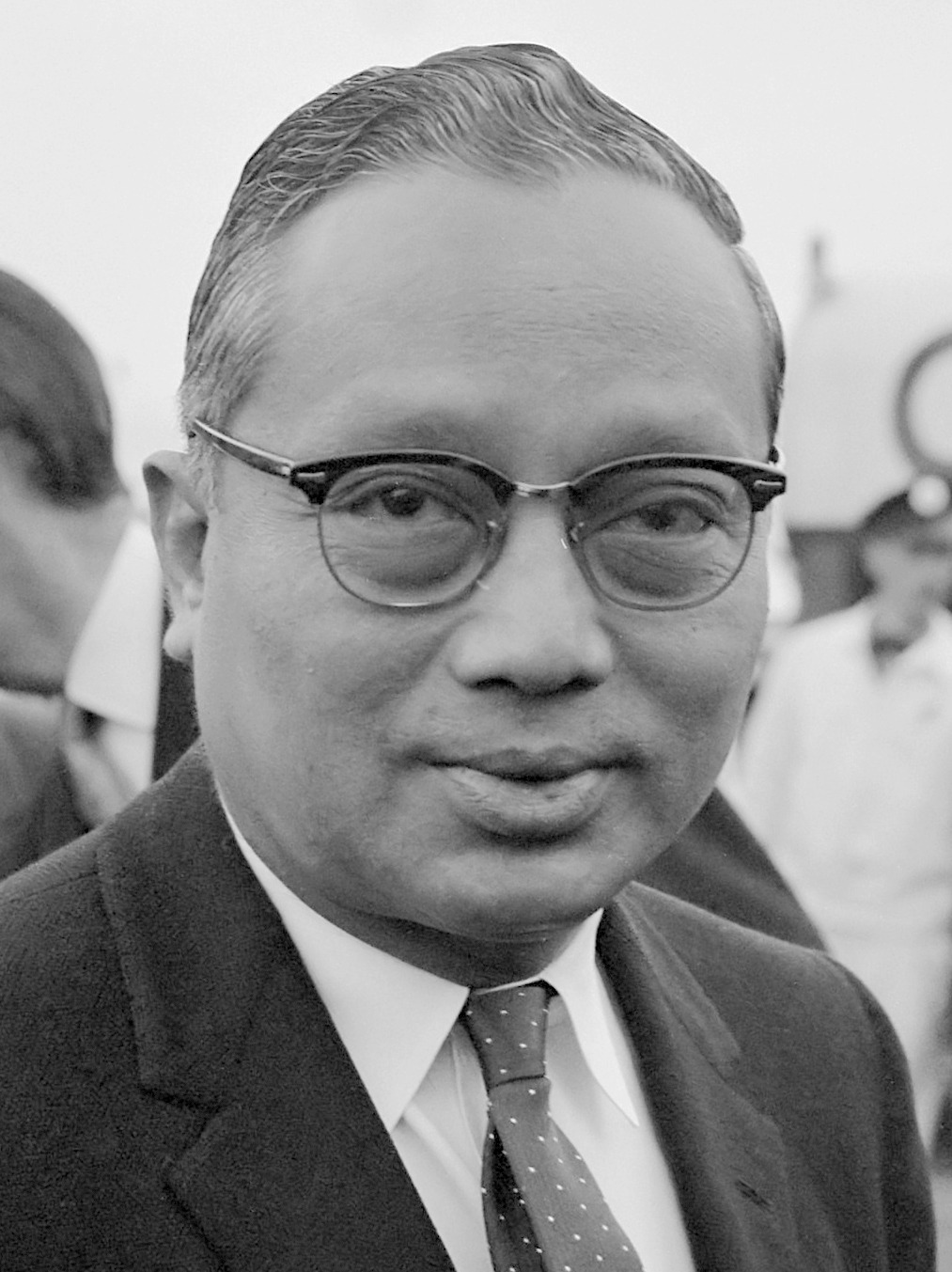
U Thant

- November 5 – Stafford Repp, American actor (b. 1918)
- November 7
  - Rodolfo Acosta, Mexican-born American actor (b. 1920)
  - Eric Linklater, British author (b. 1899)
- November 8 – Ivory Joe Hunter, American rhythm & blues singer, songwriter, and pianist (b. 1914)
- November 9 – Egon Wellesz, British composer, teacher and musicologist (b. 1885)
- November 11 – Ralf Harolde, American actor (b. 1899)
- November 13
  - Vittorio De Sica, Italian actor and film director (b. 1901)
  - Karen Silkwood, American chemical technician and labor union activist (b. 1946)
- November 14 – Johnny Mack Brown, American football star and actor (b. 1904)
- November 15 – Robert Hugo, Duke of Parma (b. 1909)
- November 16 – Walther Meissner, German technical physicist (b. 1882)
- November 17
  - Erskine Hamilton Childers, Irish politician, 4th President of Ireland (b. 1905)
  - Clive Brook, English actor (b. 1887)
- November 18 – Gösta Lilliehöök, Swedish pentathlete and 1912 Olympic Games champion (b. 1884)
- November 19 – Alessandro Momo, Italian actor (b. 1956)
- November 21 – Frank Martin, Swiss composer (b. 1890)
- November 23
  - Cornelius Ryan, Irish-born American writer (b. 1920)
  - Massacre of the Sixty in Ethiopia of government and military officials.
    - Abiye Abebe, politician and army officer (b. 1918)
    - Aklilu Habte-Wold, politician and 6th Prime Minister of Ethiopia (b. 1912)
    - Aman Andom, army officer and 1st President of Ethiopia (b. 1924)
    - Asrate Medhin Kassa, aristocrat and army officer (b. 1922)
    - Endelkachew Makonnen, politician and 4th Prime Minister of Ethiopia (b. 1927)
- November 25
  - Nick Drake, British musician (b. 1948)
  - Joe Rinaldi, American screenwriter (b. 1914)
  - U Thant, Burmese diplomat and 3rd Secretary-General of the United Nations (b. 1909)
- November 26 – Cyril Connolly, English critic and writer (b. 1903)
- November 28 – Konstantin Melnikov, Soviet architect (b. 1890)
- November 29
  - James J. Braddock, American boxer (b. 1905)
  - Peng Dehuai, Chinese military leader (b. 1898)

=== December ===
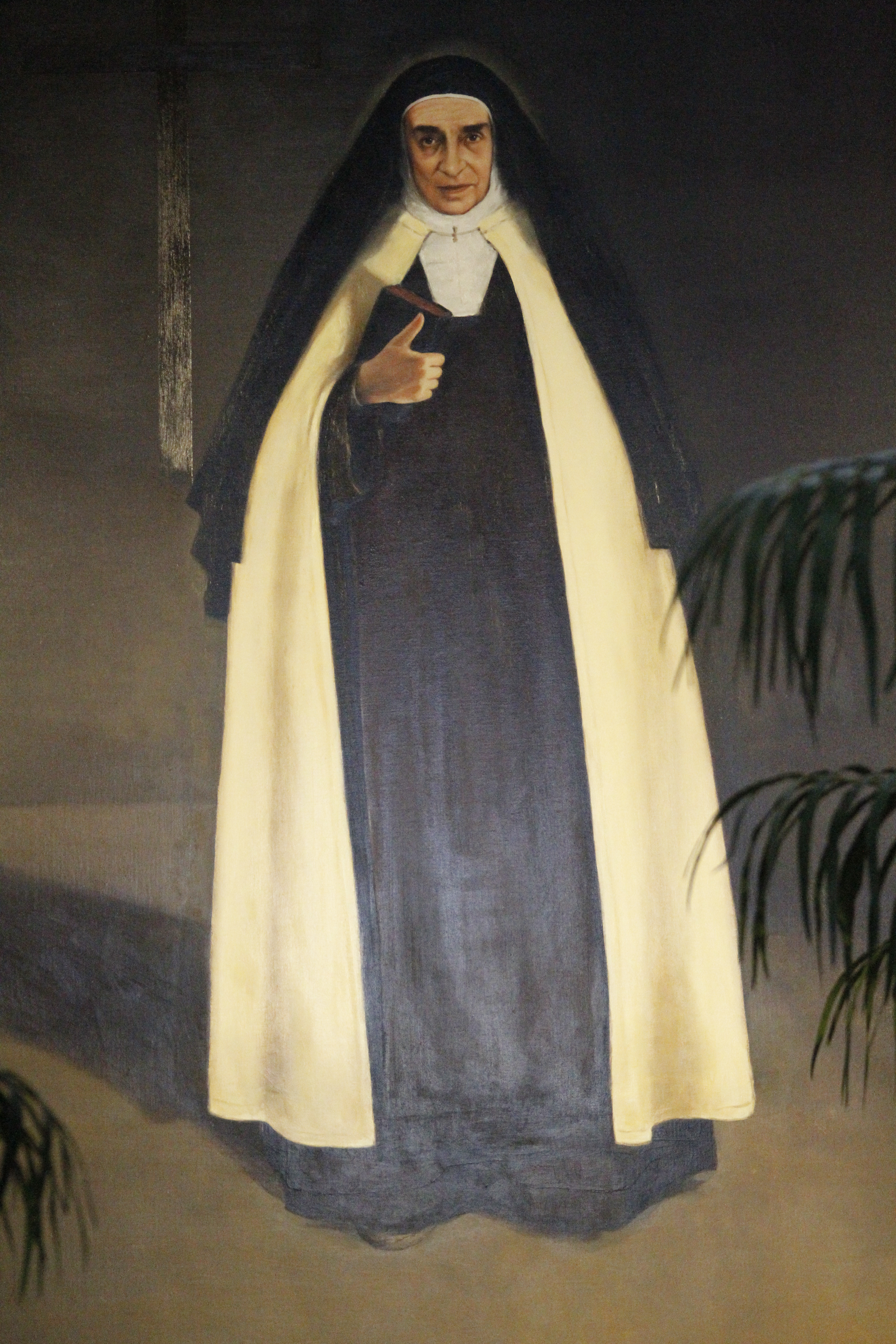
Saint María de las Maravillas de Jesús

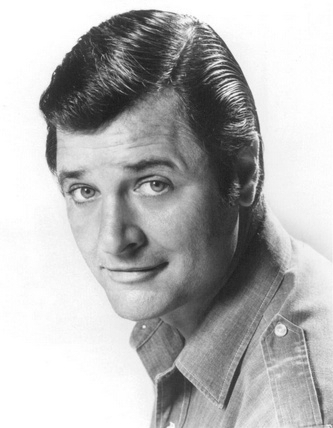
Richard Long

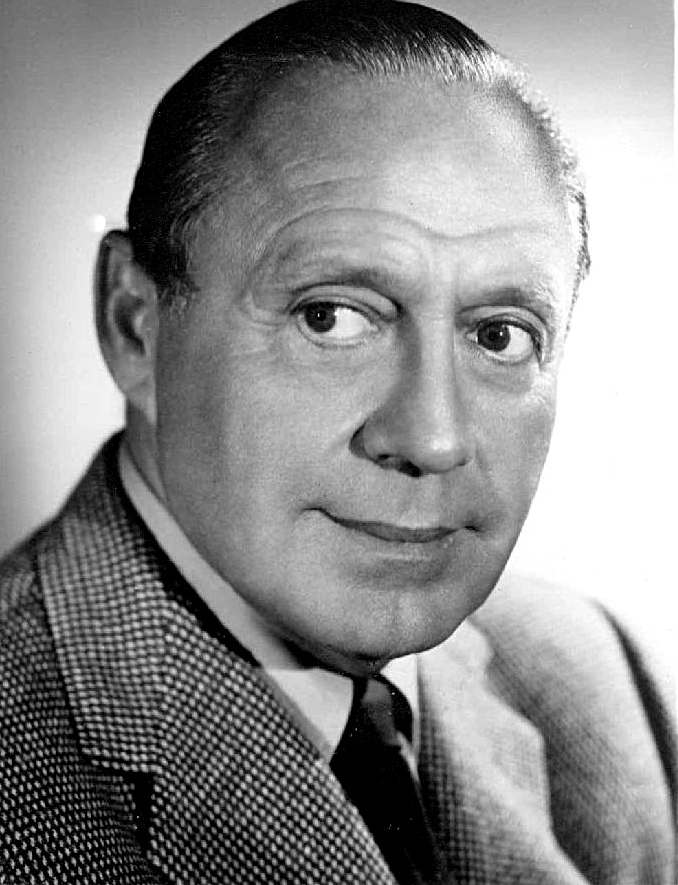
Jack Benny

- December 1 – Anita Brenner, Mexican anthropologist, historian and author (b. 1905)
- December 3 – Hans Leibelt, German film actor (b. 1885)
- December 5
  - Pietro Germi, Italian actor, screenwriter and director (b. 1914)
  - Zaharia Stancu, Romanian prose writer (b. 1902)
  - Hazel Hotchkiss Wightman, American tennis player (b. 1886)
- December 6 – Nikolai Kuznetsov, Russian admiral (b. 1904)
- December 9 – Ludwig Weber, Austrian bass (b. 1899)
- December 10 – Paul Richards, American actor, Beneath the Planet of the Apes (b. 1924)
- December 11
  - María de las Maravillas de Jesús, Spanish Roman Catholic professed member of the Discalced Carmelites and saint (b. 1891)
  - Reed Hadley, American actor (b. 1911)
- December 13 – John G. Bennett, British mathematician (b. 1897)
- December 14 – Walter Lippmann, American writer and journalist (b. 1889)
- December 15 – Anatole Litvak, Ukrainian-born film director (b. 1902)
- December 16 – Kostas Varnalis, Greek poet (b. 1884)
- December 17 – Bing Slamet, Indonesian singer, songwriter, comedian and actor (b. 1927)
- December 18 – Harry Hooper, American baseball player (Boston Red Sox) and a member of the MLB Hall of Fame (b. 1887)
- December 20 – André Jolivet, French composer (b. 1905)
- December 21 – Richard Long, American actor (b. 1927)
- December 26
  - Farid al-Atrash, Arab composer, singer and actor (b. 1910)
  - Jack Benny, American actor (b. 1894)
  - Frank Hussey, American Olympic athlete (b. 1905)
- December 27
  - Vladimir Fock, Soviet last of the physicist (b. 1898)
  - Ned Maddrell, last surviving native speaker of the Manx language (b. 1877)
- December 29 – Robert Ellis, American actor (b. 1892)
- December 31 – Robert Pache, Swiss footballer (b. 1897)

== Nobel Prizes ==

- Physics – Sir Martin Ryle, Antony Hewish
- Chemistry – Paul Flory
- Medicine – Albert Claude, Christian de Duve, George Emil Palade
- Literature – Eyvind Johnson, Harry Martinson
- Peace – Seán MacBride, Eisaku Satō
- Economics – Gunnar Myrdal, Friedrich Hayek
