= November 1974 =

Month of 1974

<<	November 1974					>>
Su	Mo	Tu	We	Th	Fr	Sa
					1	2
3	4	5	6	7	8	9
10	11	12	13	14	15	16
17	18	19	20	21	22	23
24	25	26	27	28	29	30

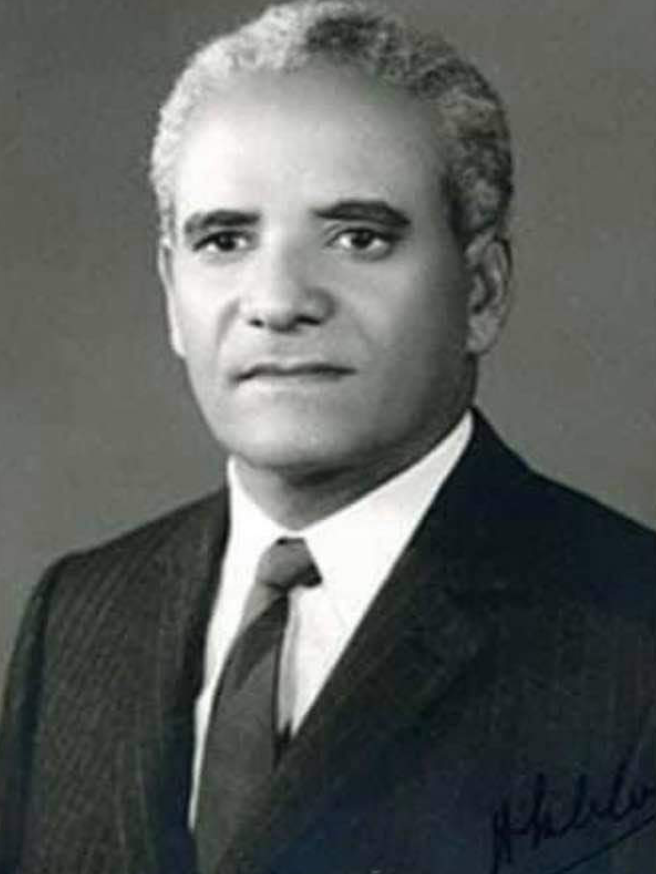
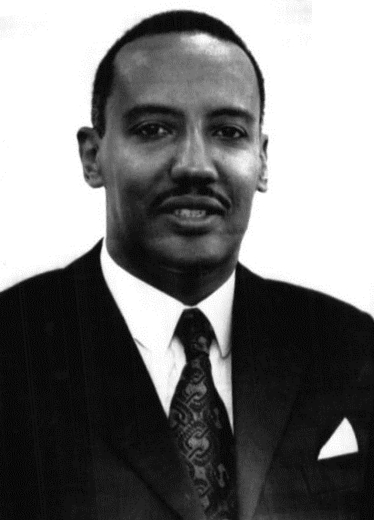
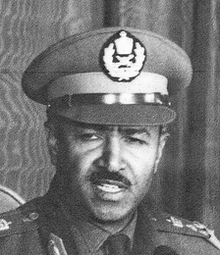
November 23, 1974: Ethiopia's new government executes former leaders Akilu, Endelkachew and Aman, along with 57 other prisoners

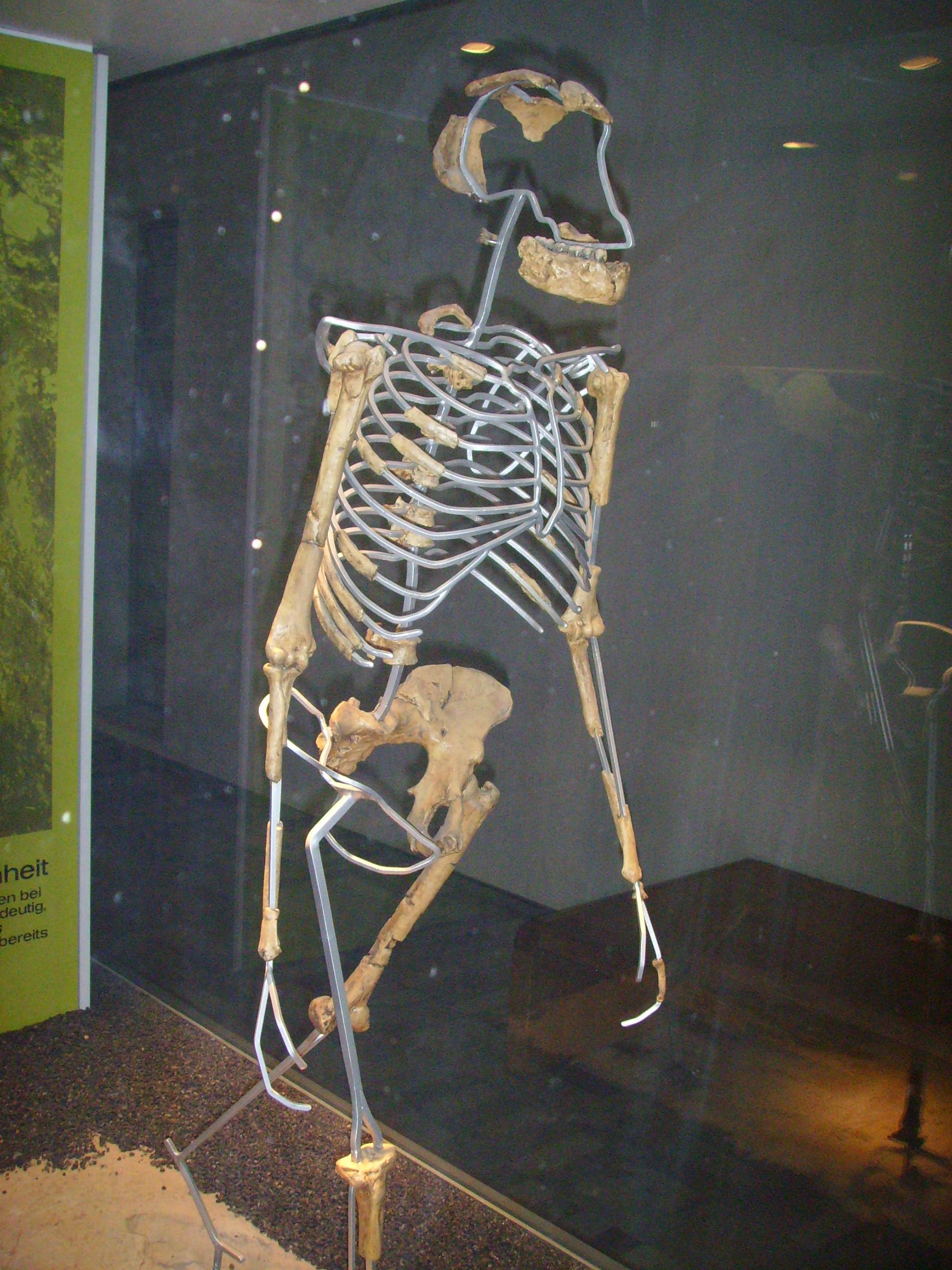
November 24, 1974: "Lucy", 3.5 million year old human ancestor, discovered in Africa (photo of cast image in Frankfurt, Germany)

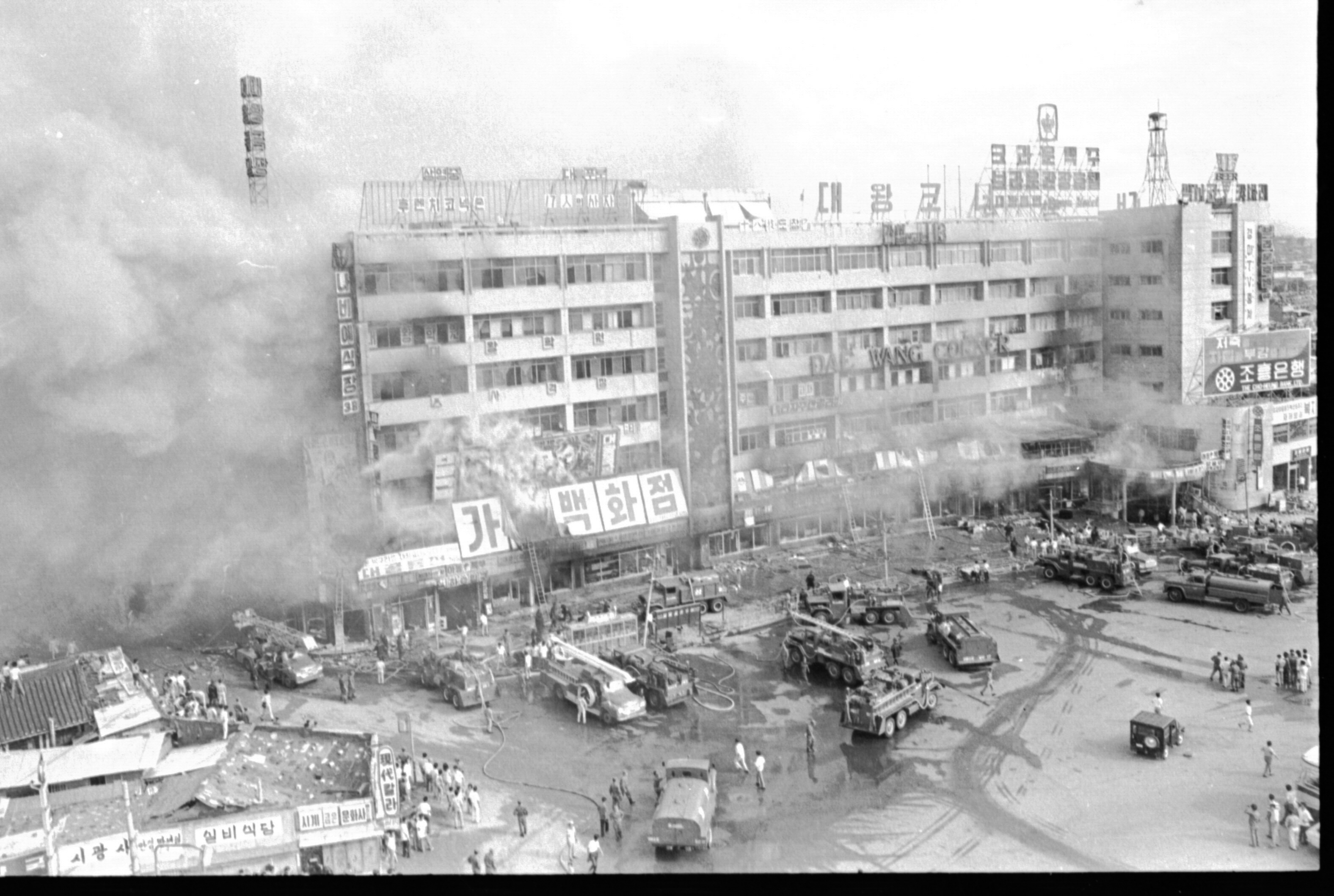
November 3, 1974: Hotel fire in South Korea kills 88 people

The following events occurred in November 1974:

== November 1, 1974 (Friday) ==
- Alberto Villar, the director of the Policía Federal Argentina secret police and a member of the Argentine Anticommunist Alliance terrorist group, was assassinated by the Montoneros terrorist group after a team of commandos, led by diver Maximo Nicoletti, placed a remote controlled bomb underneath Villar's cabin cruiser yacht and detonated it. Chief Villar died along with his wife in the blast, which took place as the boat was sailing near Tigre, Buenos Aires.
- The white minority government of South Africa granted limited self-government to QwaQwa, a 253-square-mile (660 km^{2}) portion of land bordering the Kingdom of Lesotho, as "homeland" (bantustan) for 180,000 members of the Sotho people. The homeland, which would exist until 1994, was governed during its 20-year existence by Chief Minister Tsiame Kenneth Mopeli and its capital was Witsieshoek (now Phuthaditjhaba).
- Born: Faisal bin Farhan Al Saud, Saudi Arabian Foreign Minister since 2019 and prince in the House of Sajd; as the son of Prince Farhan bin Abdullah Al Saud in Frankfurt, West Germany
- Died:
  - Baroness Moura Budberg, 82, Russian adventuress and suspected double agent for both the Soviet Union's OGPU secret police and the United Kingdom's MI6 intelligence agency
  - Ernest Muir FRCS, CIE, CMG, 94, Scottish medical missionary known for work with leprosy
  - Poco Pine, 20, American Quarter Horse and winner of 50 AQHA horse showing competitions during his career and sire of 37 other horse show champions.
  - Bullet Joe Bush (born Leslie Ambrose Bush), 81, American Major League Baseball pitcher who played for seven major league teams in a 17-year career

== November 2, 1974 (Saturday) ==
- Chilean-born British stockbroker William Beausire, who had dual citizenship in both the UK and Chile, was kidnapped by the Argentina Federal Police while he was at the Ezeiza International Airport at Buenos Aires, where he was scheduled to board a flight to Paris. Beausire was turned over to the Chilean secret police, the Dirección de Inteligencia Nacional (DINA), where he was tortured. He was last seen in public on July 2, 1975, and became one of the thousands of "desaparecidos" who disappeared during the Pinochet regime in Chile.
- In an exhibition at Korakuen Stadium in Japan, U.S. and world career home run leader Hank Aaron and Japan's career home run leader Sadaharu Oh competed against each other in a "home run derby". Aaron narrowly defeated Oh, 10 runs to 9.
- The historic Jagiełło Oak tree in Poland, standing 128 feet (39 m) tall and 210 inches (5,300 mm) in circumference, was blown down in a storm.
- Born:
  - Nelly (stage name of Cornell Iral Haynes Jr.), American rapper; in Austin, Texas
  - Aleksey Shevchenkov, Russian stage and film actor known for Tourist and The Red Ghost; in Chernyakhovsk, Russian SFSR, Soviet Union
- Died: Nelson "Jack" Edwards, 57, the first African-American vice president of the United Auto Workers, was shot and killed while trying to break up an argument at a West Side Detroit bar.

== November 3, 1974 (Sunday) ==
- An early-morning fire at the Daewang Corner building in the Dongdaemun District of Seoul killed 88 people and injured 35. Firefighters reported that 65 of the victims had been inside the Time Go-Go Club on the building's sixth floor; 13 others had been trapped in their hotel rooms on the seventh floor, and six of them had jumped to their deaths. According to witnesses who were able to escape immediately, employees of the club closed the only exit door to prevent other customers from leaving without paying.
- The popular German TV detective series Derrick, starring Horst Tappert as Detective Chief Inspector Stephan Derrick and Fritz Wepper as his assistant, Detective Sergeant Harry Klein, premiered on West Germany's ZDF network for the first of 281 episodes over 25 seasons.
- A yes or no election was held in the North African nation of Tunisia for official approval of the re-election of President Habib Bourguiba and the approval of the list of candidates for the 112-member Majlis, as selected by the nation's sole legal political party, the Parti socialiste destourien (PSD). The government reported that almost 97% of registered voters turned out for the election and none of them voted against Borguiba or the PSD candidates.
- The U.S. Navy nuclear ballistic missile submarine USS James Madison (SSBN-627) collided with an unidentified Soviet Navy Victor-class nuclear-powered attack submarine, during a dive just after departing from the Fleet Ballistic Missile (FBM) Refit Site One on Scotland's Holy Loch. No confrontation took place, and no casualties were sustained on the U.S. sub, which was under inspection and repair for a week afterward. Any damage to the Soviet submarine was not revealed by the Soviets.
- Died:
  - Frances Bemis, 76, American public relations specialist and fashion director, was murdered in a vacant lot in St. Augustine, Florida, near the location of the January 23 murder of Athalia Ponsell Lindsley. As of 2007, both Lindsley's and Bemis's murders remained unsolved.
  - Ahindra Choudhury, 78, Indian stage actor who had a 53-year career

== November 4, 1974 (Monday) ==
- The first patent application for a process for recombinant DNA was filed for the invention of Stanley N. Cohen of Stanford University and Herbert W. Boyer of the University of California, San Francisco. U.S. Patent No. 4,237,224 would be granted on December 2, 1980.
- The first solar-powered airplane, Sunrise I, made its initial flight after being launched in the U.S. by brothers Robert J. Boucher and Roland Boucher, founders of the AstroFlight company, at a dry lake within the Mojave Desert in Camp Irwin, California; Sunrise I had a wingspan of 32 feet (9.8 m) and weighed 27.5 pounds (12.5 kg), with a 400-watt array of solar cells mounted on the wings. The airplane, not yet ready for a human pilot, flew for almost 20 minutes at an altitude of 300 feet (91 m).
- In one of the great upsets of boxing, heavyweight Earnie Shavers, who had a record of 46 wins (44 by knockout or TKO) and only 3 losses, lost a unanimous decision to unknown boxer Bob Stallings, who had 21 wins, 24 losses and only four knockouts.
- Born: Numair Atif Choudhury, Bangladeshi novelist; in Dhaka (d. 2018)
- Died: Edgar Fernhout, 62, Dutch painter

== November 5, 1974 (Tuesday) ==
- In the United States, the Democratic Party made major gains nationwide in the elections for the U.S. Congress, particularly in the House of Representatives, where the Democrats won a two-thirds majority, with 291 of the 435 seats. The election also brought 93 first-time Representatives. With 34 of the 100 U.S. Senate seats on the ballot, the Democrats gained four formerly Republican seats to increase their majority to 61 to 37. Former NASA astronaut John Glenn, the first American to orbit the Earth, was elected to the U.S. Senate for the first time.
- The People's Republic of China failed in its first attempt to launch its new Long March 2 rocket.
- Simas Kudirka, who had made an unsuccessful attempt to defect from the Soviet Union to the United States in 1971, arrived in New York along with his wife, his two children and his mother after being allowed to leave Moscow earlier in the day. Kudirka had jumped onto a U.S. Coast Guard ship but then was returned to the custody of the Soviets, who sentenced him to 10 years imprisonment for treason.
- Born:
  - Zheng Li, Chinese television news anchor known for her China Central Television (CCTV) evening program Xinwen Lianbo (Simulcast News); in Kedong County, Heilongjiang province
  - Ryan Adams (born David Ryan Adams), American singer and songwriter; in Jacksonville, North Carolina
  - Dado Pršo (born Miladin Pršo), Croatian footballer with 23 caps for the Croatia National Team; in Zadar, Socialist Republic of Croatia, Yugoslavia
  - Jerry Stackhouse, American college and NBA basketball player; in Kinston, North Carolina
- Died:
  - Anwar Ali, 61, Pakistani economist, governor of the Saudi Arabian Monetary Authority since 1958, died following a heart attack.
  - John C. Farrar, 78, American editor, writer and publisher, co-founder of Farrar & Rinehart and Farrar, Straus and Giroux
  - Patrick Buchan-Hepburn, 1st Baron Hailes, GBE, CH, PC, 73, British politician, Governor-General of the West Indies Federation from 1958 to 1962
  - Stafford Repp, 56, American actor known for playing Chief Miles O'Hara on the Batman television series, died of a heart attack.
  - Marguerite Namara (stage name for Marguerite Banks), 85, American opera soprano
  - William Gardner Smith, 47, American journalist, novelist and editor, died of cancer of the esophagus.
  - Abdellatif Zeroual, 23, Moroccan dissident and official of the Ila al-Amam Marxist group, disappeared after being taken away by a group of plainclothes police.

== November 6, 1974 (Wednesday) ==
- At least 80 people died in a collision between two passenger trains 43 miles (69 km) west of Cotonou, Dahomey.
- The Soviet Union's lunar probe Luna 23 landed on the Moon in the Mare Crisium for the purpose of gathering and returning lunar soil to the Earth. The probe's drill was damaged when Luna 23 tipped over after landing on "unfavorable" terrain.
- Argentina's President Isabel Perón unexpectedly issued an emergency decree of a "state of siege" in the South American nation in an effort to deal with political violence that had claimed 136 lives during her first 129 days in office. The decree banned all public meetings and allowed any suspected terrorists to be arrested without a court order and held indefinitely without being brought to trial.
- Thirty-three inmates at the Long Kesh Prison (later called the "Maze Prison") in Northern Ireland, most of them convicted terrorists of the IRA, attempted to escape through an underground tunnel which they had dug. IRA member Hugh Coney was shot and killed by a guard after emerging outside the walls, and 29 others were captured only a few yards past the prison. The other three were captured within 24 hours.
- U.S. Treasury Secretary William E. Simon conceded in a press conference that the United States economy was in a recession as stock prices continued to fall.
- The Parliament of Singapore unanimously re-elected Benjamin Sheares to a second term as president, a largely ceremonial job, with 59 of the 65 members present and all 59 voting in his favor.

== November 7, 1974 (Thursday) ==
- The President of Bolivia, General Hugo Banzer, personally led the suppression of a rebellion of Bolivian Army troops who had seized control of the cities of Santa Cruz and Montero, according to government radio broadcasts. A radio broadcast from the capital at La Paz said that Banzer flew to Cochabamba, where he rallied loyal paratroopers, then flew with them to the outskirts of Santa Cruz where, "with the aid of planes, air force cadets and loyal troops in Cochabamba and Santa Cruz, Banzer led the march on the rebel-held city and crushed the uprising."
- At Cape Canaveral, Florida, NASA held a final dress rehearsal for the Apollo–Soyuz mission, scheduled for launch in July 1975. Many of the technicians who participated in the simulation anticipated losing their jobs once the mission flew.
- An explosion at a black powder plant in Roosevelt, Utah, killed employees Fred Anderson and Lester Holt.
- Died:
  - Rodolfo Acosta, 54, Mexican-born American actor, died of liver cancer.
  - Alexander Bickel, 49, American legal scholar and constitutional law expert, died of cancer.
  - Sherburne F. Cook, 77, American physiologist and demographist, died of cancer.
  - Eric Linklater, 75, British author, Carnegie Medal recipient for The Wind on the Moon
  - Helene Thimig, 85, Austrian stage and film actress, widow of Max Reinhardt, died of heart failure.

== November 8, 1974 (Friday) ==
- American pop singer and actress Connie Francis was raped at knife-point in her room at a Howard Johnson's motel in Westbury, New York, after performing at the Westbury Music Fair the previous evening. Francis subsequently sued the motel chain for failing to provide adequate security and reportedly won a $2.5 million judgment, one of the largest such judgments in history, leading to a reform in hotel security. Her rapist was never found.
- The original Covent Garden market in London closed after 300 years, with a bell tolling at 11 a.m. to mark the occasion. The Covent Garden had been established in 1671 by King Charles I. The market would reopen the following Monday as the New Covent Garden Market, at a new site 2.5 miles (4.0 km) away.
- Judge Frank J. Battisti of the United States District Court for the Northern District of Ohio acquitted 8 former members of the Ohio Army National Guard in the May 4, 1970, Kent State shootings, finding that the prosecution had not proved beyond a reasonable doubt that the guardsmen intended to violate protestors' civil rights. Battisti stated in his opinion: "It is vital that state and National Guard officials not regard this decision as authorizing or approving the use of force against demonstrators, whatever the occasion of the issue involved. Such use of force is, and was, deplorable."
- The NBC television network broadcast an episode of the police procedural series Police Woman involving a lesbian crime ring. In response to protests from gay rights groups, NBC agreed later in the month not to rebroadcast the episode.
- Born:
  - Penelope Heyns, South African Olympic champion swimmer; in Springs, Transvaal
  - Masashi Kishimoto, Japanese manga author; in Nagi, Okayama
  - Matthew Rhys, Welsh actor; in Cardiff
- Died:
  - John Bingham, 7th Earl of Lucan, 39, a member of the House of Lords in the United Kingdom, disappeared the day after the murder of Sandra Rivett, the nanny of his children, at the Lucan family home at 46 Lower Belgrave Street in the wealthy Belgravia district of London. Accused by his estranged wife, Veronica Duncan, of attacking her and of murdering Rivett, Lord Lucan was last seen alive by a friend in Uckfield, East Sussex. Lucan's blood-soaked car was found two days later in Newhaven, East Sussex. Named at an inquest seven months later as Rivett's murderer, Lucan was never located and would be declared legally dead on October 27, 1999.
  - Ivory Joe Hunter, 60, American rhythm and blues singer, songwriter, and pianist, died of lung cancer.

== November 9, 1974 (Saturday) ==
- The fiery collision in Tokyo Bay of the Taiwanese freighter Pacific Ares and the Japanese oil tanker Yuyo Maru No. 10 killed 33 sailors, all but one of them on the freighter. The Pacific Ares had departed from Kawasaki with cargo for Los Angeles and was 4 miles (6.4 km) out to sea when it encountered the incoming Yuyo Maru. Rescue boats saved 34 survivors, and 19 bodies were found, but 14 other sailors listed as missing were not recovered.
- Two days after putting down a revolt in Bolivia, President Hugo Banzer suspended the activities of all political parties, labor unions, employer organizations and professional associations and canceled plans for democratic elections until at least 1980. Banzer dismissed his civilian cabinet and formed a new "national reconstruction government", commenting that "Here and now, a new history will begin for Bolivia." The move came after the military leadership of Bolivia, led by Air Force General Oscar Adriazola, informed President Banzer in a memo that the generals were "categorically and definitely not in agreement with holding elections or returning to the parliamentary system while the critical period the country is going through internally is not yet over."
- In the British Virgin Islands, a fisherman discovered the body of 23-year-old American marine biologist David Drew, who had apparently fallen and hit his head, in a rocky crevice on Cockroach Island. Drew was buried at sea the following day.
- A bomb exploded on the second floor of the Organization of American States headquarters in Washington, D.C. No one was injured. A previously unknown group called "Cuba Movement C-4" claimed responsibility for the bombing, stating its opposition to the Cuban regime of Fidel Castro.
- Nine people, ranging in age from 2 to 44 years old, were killed in the crash of a single car when their vehicle broke through a guardrail on Interstate 20 near Longview, Texas, and fell 50 feet (15 m), landing upside down. All of the persons killed were residents of Midwest City, Oklahoma, who were traveling to a family reunion when the driver fell asleep and the car went out of control.

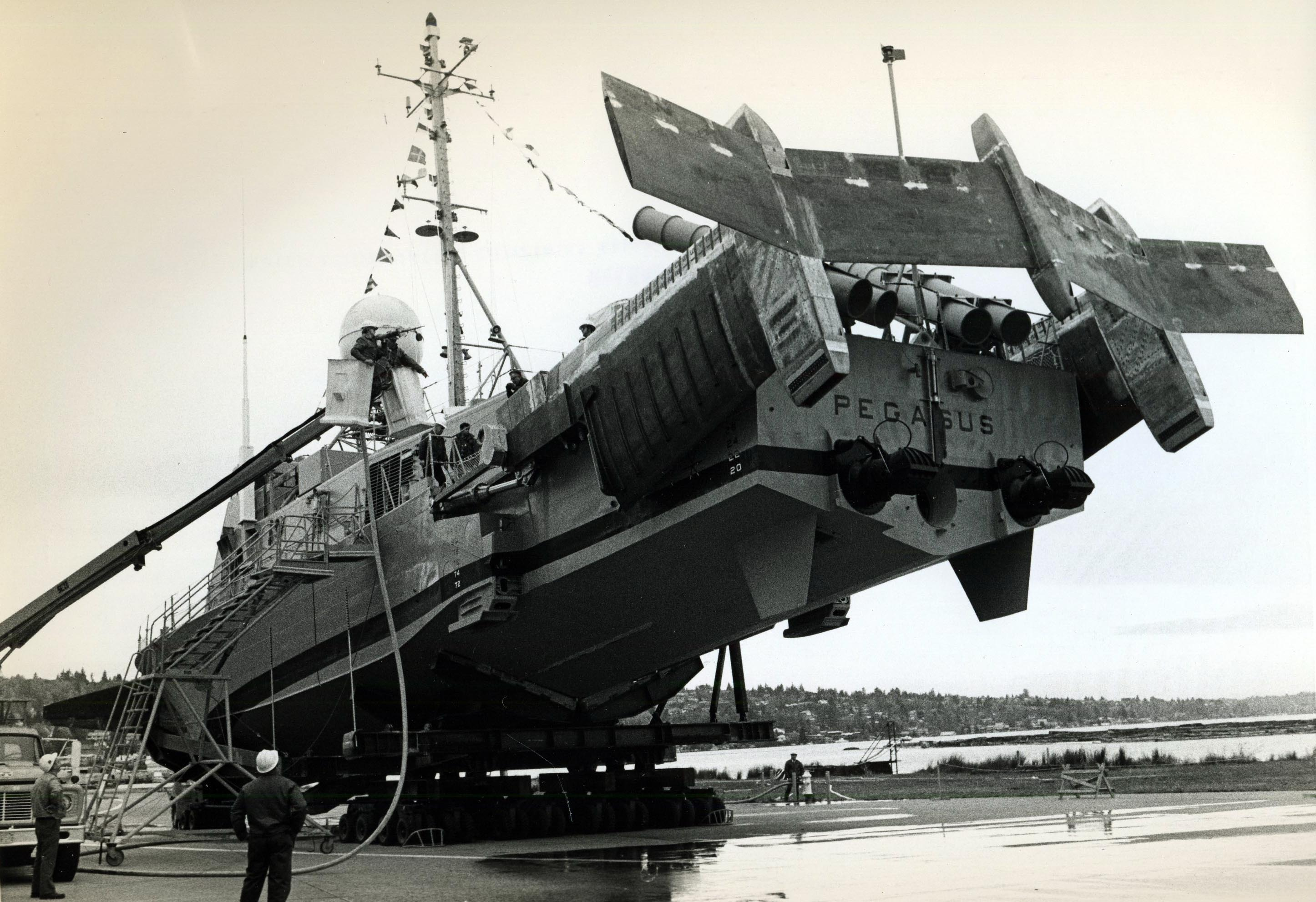
Workmen hose down USS Pegasus on the day before launch

- In Seattle, Washington, the U.S. Navy launched USS Pegasus (PHM-1), the lead ship of the Pegasus-class hydrofoils designated "PHM" for "Patrol Hydrofoil, Missile".
- Born: Alessandro Del Piero, Italian football player; in Conegliano
- Died:
  - Richard McCoy Jr., 31, an American who had been convicted for the 1972 hijacking of United Airlines Flight 855, and had escaped from the federal prison in Lewisburg, Pennsylvania on August 10, was killed in a shootout with FBI agents who had located him at a house he had been renting in Virginia Beach, Virginia. FBI agents also arrested Melvin Dale Walker, who had escaped from prison with McCoy.
  - Holger Meins, 33, West German anarchist and terrorist convicted of work with the Red Army Faction, died in prison after a two-month hunger strike.
  - Paul Tabori (born Pál Tábori), 65, Hungarian-born author and screenwriter
  - Egon Wellesz, CBE, FBA, 89, British composer, teacher and musicologist

== November 10, 1974 (Sunday) ==
- Soviet Head of State Nikolai V. Podgorny said in a speech that any artwork in the Soviet Union that "departed even slightly from the principles of socialist realism" would be considered unacceptable by the Soviet Ministry of Culture. Podgorny's remarks came at a ceremony marking the 150th anniversary of Moscow's Maly Theater.
- Haile Selassie, who had been the Emperor of Ethiopia until being deposed from office on September 12 and placed under arrest, was transported by the Republic of Ethiopia's revolutionary council to the National Palace, where he had once maintained offices. Since his arrest, he had been detained in the Ethiopian Army's 4th Division barracks at the quarters reserved for the Division's commanding general. Selassie had lived at the Jubilee Palace in Addis Ababa until his overthrow.
- A bomb which exploded at 2:45 a.m. caused $5,000 in damage to a United Nations Association bookstore in Los Angeles. There were no injuries.
- Died:
  - George Counts, 84, American educator and education theorist
  - Günter von Drenkmann, 64, German lawyer, president of the "Kammergericht" (West Berlin district court), was murdered on his 64th birthday by a group of men who appeared at his home in Charlottenburg. Judge von Drenkmann was shot four times when he answered his doorbell. Authorities were unable to rule out a link with Holger Meins' death the previous day.
  - Robert Simpson, 82, American hurdler, track and field coach and United States Army officer

== November 11, 1974 (Monday) ==
- A previously unknown subatomic particle, the J/psi meson, was discovered independently by two different groups of researchers. The discovery led to rapid changes in high-energy physics which collectively became known as the "November Revolution". Burton Richter and Samuel C. C. Ting received the 1976 Nobel Prize in Physics "for their pioneering work in the discovery of a heavy elementary particle of a new kind."
- The crime that would lead to the arrest and execution of Pakistan's Prime Minister Zulfikar Ali Bhutto took place after the Nawab judge Muhammad Ahmed Khan Kasuri was shot to death during an apparent attempt to assassinate his son, Pakistan National Assembly representative Ahmad Raza Khan Kasuri. Prime Minister Bhutto would be arrested in 1977 on suspicion of ordering the assassination of Ahmad Kasuri and hanged in 1979.
- After more than three months of fighting between the People's Army of Vietnam (PAVN, invading from North Vietnam) and the Army of the Republic of Viet Nam (ARVN, defending South Vietnam), and hundreds of deaths on both sides, the Communist PAVN won the Battle of Thuong Duc, but the ARVN was able to prevent the Communists from capturing the South Vietnamese city of Da Nang. South Vietnam would fall to the Communists less than six months later.
- The Greek Cypriot President of Cyprus, Glafkos Clerides, and the leader of the Turkish Cypriot community in northern Cyprus, Rauf Denktash, agreed that 1,600 elderly Greek Cypriots in the Turkish zone would be allowed to be transported to the Greek Cypriot zone.
- Seven miners were killed in South Africa after heavy rains caused a mudslide at the Bafokeng mine of Impala Platinum Company.
- After the victory of the Far East team from Taiwan in the 1974 Little League World Series, the U.S.-based Little League Baseball Inc. announced that the Series would be limited to United States teams only.
- Internationally renowned opera singer Maria Callas gave her last public performance, appearing at Sapporo in Japan.
- Born:
  - Leonardo DiCaprio, American actor, producer and environmentalist; in Los Angeles
  - Olesya Zheleznyak, Russian theater and film actress, and 2002 Seagull Award winner; in Moscow
- Died:
  - Benito Perojo, 80, Spanish film director and producer
  - Jane Ace (born Jane Epstein), 74, American radio comedy performer, died of cancer.
  - J. Hunter Guthrie SJ, 73, American Roman Catholic priest, former President of Georgetown University
  - Aharon Meskin, 77, Hebrew theater actor, died of a heart attack.

== November 12, 1974 (Tuesday) ==
- The United Nations General Assembly voted, 91 to 22, to suspend South Africa from participation in participation in Assembly matters for the remainder of the 1974-1975 session. The suspension would remain in effect for almost 20 years until the end of apartheid on June 23, 1994.
- The Convention on Registration of Objects Launched into Outer Space was adopted for signing by the members of the U.N. General Assembly. It would go into effect on September 15, 1976, after being ratified by five nations.
- The United States and the Republic of Algeria restored diplomatic relations after Algeria had suspended the relationship in 1967.
- The United Mine Workers of America (UMWA) began a nationwide strike as 120,000 coal miners walked off their jobs. The strike ended on December 10 after less than a month.
- The Universidad Tecnológica de Santiago was established in the Dominican Republic.
- Jack Teich, a wealthy 34-year-old U.S. executive and an owner of the Acme Architectural Products company, was kidnapped from his home at Kings Point, New York, and held for captive until a record ransom of $750,000 (worth more than $4.5 million in 2024) was paid for his safe release on November 19.
- William Flowers, a 19-year-old student at Monmouth College in New Jersey, died of suffocation during a hazing ritual for pledges of the Delta Rho Chapter of the Zeta Beta Tau fraternity. The pledges were forced to dig "graves" in beach sand and lie in them, and Flowers' "grave" collapsed in on him. Flowers was the first black student to pledge for Zeta Beta Tau at Monmouth. The national fraternity subsequently suspended the Monmouth chapter as a result of the incident.
- American composer George Crumb released the first of four volumes of his work for piano, Makrokosmos.
- Member nations of the Organization of American States (OAS), meeting in Quito in Ecuador, voted, 12 to 9, to end the 10-year-long embargo against Cuba, but fell two votes short of the two-thirds majority required by the OAS.
- Born: Tareck El Aissami, Vice President of Venezuela from 2017 to 2018; in El Vigia
- Died:
  - Samuel Echt, 86, German historian and teacher
  - Guido Piovene, 67, Italian novelist and journalist

== November 13, 1974 (Wednesday) ==
- Ronald Joseph DeFeo Jr. shot and killed all six of his family members while they slept in their beds inside the family's home at 112 Ocean Avenue in Amityville, New York, on Long Island. The story of the murders, and the supernatural events alleged by the Lutz family after their purchase of the house in 1975, would become the basis for a bestselling book in 1977 by Jay Anson and a popular 1979 horror film.
- Yasser Arafat, Chairman of the Palestine Liberation Organization, became the first representative of an entity other than a member state to address the United Nations General Assembly, and spoke about the concerns of the Palestinian people in the occupied territories of Israel.
- Born:
  - Matthew Prince, American business executive and billionaire who founded the technology company Cloudflare; in Salt Lake City, Utah
  - Kerim Seiler, Swiss artist and architect; in Bern
- Died:
  - Karen Silkwood, 28, American chemical technician and labor union activist, was killed near Oklahoma City, Oklahoma, in a suspicious car crash, while driving to a meeting with David Burnham, an investigative reporter for The New York Times.
  - Vittorio De Sica, 73, Italian actor and film director known for Shoeshine and Bicycle Thieves. His death in Paris came on the same day that his final film, Il Viaggio (The Voyage), starring Sophia Loren and Richard Burton, had been scheduled for its French premiere.
  - Romuald Iodko, 79, Soviet sculptor known for the popular statue Girl with an Oar (Devishka s veslom)

== November 14, 1974 (Thursday) ==
- In Paris, the International Energy Agency was formed by representatives of 16 nations— the U.S., the UK, Canada, West Germany, Italy, Japan, the Netherlands, Austria, Belgium, Denmark, Ireland, Luxembourg, Spain, Sweden, Switzerland and Turkey— in a cooperative agreement to pool the combined oil supplies of the members in the event of another embargo by oil-producing nations.
- Portuguese Army Major General Mário Lemos Pires took office as the last colonial governor of Portuguese Timor, a colonial possession of Portugal since 1702. Granted independence by Portugal in 1975, the area on the island of Timor was quickly annexed by Indonesia.
- Jane Lauren Alpert, a former member of the U.S. left-wing terrorist group Weather Underground and a fugitive for four-and-a-half years after posting a bail bond and failing to appear for her sentencing in 1970 for conspiracy to bomb two U.S. government buildings, voluntarily surrendered at the federal prosecutor's office in New York City. She would be released in 1977 after 27 months' imprisonment.
- Died:
  - Omar Al Saqqaf, 51, Saudi Arabian diplomat and politician, Minister of State for Foreign Affairs, died of a cerebral thrombosis.
  - Aleksandr Panyushkin, 69, Soviet Ambassador to the United States from 1947 to 1952.
  - Johnny Mack Brown, 70, American football halfback and actor known primarily for Western films, died of kidney failure.
  - F. Trubee Davison, 78, American World War I aviator, government official, and former president of the American Museum of Natural History
  - James Phelan, 81, American football coach for Purdue University and the University of Washington, and later coach in the AAFC and the NFL.

== November 15, 1974 (Friday) ==
- Congressional elections were held in Brazil for all 364 seats of the Câmara dos Deputados and 22 of the 66 seats of the Senado Federal. With 54 new seats added to the Camara since the 1970 election, most of which were won by the minority Movimento Democrático Brasileiro (MDB), the lead of the ruling ARENA (Aliança Renovadora Nacional) Party changed from 223–87 to 203–161.
- In Egypt, 50 people drowned when an overloaded sailing craft sank in the Nile near the town of Desouk.
- Ethiopia's Head of State, General Aman Andom, Chairman of the Derg, angered other Derg members, including Lieutenant Colonel Mengistu Haile Mariam, when he sent a message to all military units critical of the Derg government. Andom would be executed eight days later in the Derg's purge of former government and military officials.
- The James Bay and Northern Quebec Agreement was signed in Quebec City between representatives of the Canadian national government and the Quebec provincial government; the Hydro-Québec electrical utilities corporation; and the governing bodies of the two indigenous tribes whose lands were affected, the Grand Council of the Crees (led by Waskaganish Chief Billy Diamond) and the Northern Quebec Inuit Association.
- At Vandenberg Air Force Base, in the first U.S. launch of three orbiting satellites on the same rocket vehicle, NASA used a Delta rocket to orbit Spain's first satellite, INTASAT; the NOAA-4 weather satellite; and the AMSAT-OSCAR 7 (AO-7) amateur radio satellite.
- Universal Pictures released the disaster film Earthquake, starring Charlton Heston and Ava Gardner and directed by Mark Robson. The film was the first to use the "Sensurround" system during screenings, with low-frequency and extended range bass to simulate the feeling of the vibrations of an earthquake.
- Dmitri Shostakovich's String Quartet No. 15 was given its first performance.
- Secretariat, the racehorse who had won the American Triple Crown in 1973, became a sire for the first time with the birth of his first foal, which would be named First Secretary.
- Born:
  - Ingrida Šimonytė, Prime Minister of Lithuania since 2020; in Vilnius, Lithuanian SSR, Soviet Union
  - Chad Kroeger (stage name for Chad Robert Turton), Canadian singer and guitarist for Nickelback; in Hanna, Alberta
- Died:
  - James W. Morrison, 86, American silent film actor and educator
  - Nathaniel B. Wales, 91, American inventor

== November 16, 1974 (Saturday) ==
The Arecibo "message", if properly displayed

- The radio telescope at the Arecibo Observatory on Puerto Rico sent an interstellar radio message towards Messier 13, the Great Globular Cluster in the area of the constellation Hercules in the stellar view from Earth. Transmitted multiple times at irregular intervals, the "Arecibo message" contained 1,679 (73 x 23) bits of binary code with the hope that if it reached another intelligent civilization, scientists would not only see it as evidence of Earth intelligence, but eventually display the message in picture form on a 73-row and 23-column grid. The message will reach its destination around the year 27,000 CE.
- Four Egyptian passenger ships entered the Suez Canal, the first commercial vessels to do so since the Six-Day War in 1967.
- The Universal Declaration on the Eradication of Hunger and Malnutrition was adopted by representatives of 135 nations at the World Food Conference in Rome.
- Amid ongoing political violence in Argentina, the body of Eva Perón, the former First Lady of Argentina, arrived by plane in Buenos Aires, having been repatriated from Spain on the orders of Isabel Perón, the President of Argentina and widow of Eva's husband, Juan Perón. Eva would be interred beside her husband the following day.
- Born:
  - Paul Scholes, English footballer and midfielder, with 66 caps for the England national team; in Salford, Greater Manchester
  - Brooke Elliott, American TV actress known for Drop Dead Diva and Sweet Magnolias; in Fridley, Minnesota
  - Maurizio Margaglio, Italian ice dancer, 2001 World Champion with partner Barbara Fusar-Poli; in Milan
- Died:
  - Erich Lindemann, 74, German-American writer and psychiatrist
  - Walther Meissner, 91, German technical physicist

== November 17, 1974 (Sunday) ==
- Voting was held in Greece for all 300 seats of the Hellenic Parliament in the first election since 1964. The newly formed New Democracy party, led by Prime Minister Konstantinos Karamanlis, won 220 of the seats, with the Centre Union – New Forces party of Georgios Mavros in second place with 60 seats.
- Sadi Irmak succeeded Bülent Ecevit as Prime Minister of Turkey.
- Serial killer Paul John Knowles, who had murdered 18 people since his escape from jail on July 26, was captured by a civilian in Henry County, Georgia. David Clark, a Vietnam War veteran and hospital maintenance worker, had been on a hunting trip when he encountered Knowles, who was fleeing police, and held him at gunpoint until officers could arrive at the scene. The day before, Knowles had kidnapped and murdered his last two victims, a Florida state trooper and a motorist whom he had taken hostage. Knowles himself would be shot to death on December 18 after attempting to disarm a sheriff.
- Died:
  - Clive Brook, 87, English actor
  - Erskine Childers, 68, President of Ireland since 1973, died of a heart attack while attending a conference of the Royal College of Physicians in Dublin.

== November 18, 1974 (Monday) ==
- U.S. President Gerald Ford and Secretary of State Henry Kissinger arrived in Tokyo to begin an eight-day trip to East Asia. Ford's visit to Japan was the first ever by an incumbent U.S. president.
- Napoleon Lechoco, the head of the Filipino Political Action Committee in Washington, D.C., held Eduardo Romualdez, the Ambassador of the Philippines to the United States, hostage at gunpoint for over 10 hours at the Philippine Embassy on Embassy Row, demanding that his 16-year-old son in Manila receive an exit visa. This was believed to be the first time a foreign ambassador was held hostage in the United States. Lechoco released Romualdez and surrendered to police after Philippine President Ferdinand Marcos gave assurances that his son could leave the country. Lechoco's son departed the Philippines for the United States on November 19.
- Spanish tenor José Carreras made his debut at the Metropolitan Opera in New York City, in the role of Cavaradossi in the opera Tosca by Giacomo Puccini.
- Born:
  - Chloë Sevigny, American actress; in Springfield, Massachusetts
  - Petter Solberg, Norwegian rally driver
- Died: Gösta Lilliehöök, 90, Swedish modern pentathlete and 1912 Olympic Games champion

== November 19, 1974 (Tuesday) ==
- In Seoul, South Korea, 3,000 people participated in demonstrations demanding the return of democracy to the country.
- Dedication ceremonies began for the Washington D.C. Temple of The Church of Jesus Christ of Latter-day Saints, continuing through November 22.
- Died:
  - Louise Fitzhugh, 46, American children's author known for Harriet the Spy, died of a brain aneurysm.
  - George Brunies (aka Georg Brunis), 72, American jazz trombonist of the dixieland revival, died of a heart ailment.
  - Alessandro Momo, 17, Italian actor (Malicious, Scent of a Woman), died in a motorcycle accident.

== November 20, 1974 (Wednesday) ==
- An explosion killed two members of a team investigating a tunnel in the Korean Demilitarized Zone, U.S. Navy Commander Robert M. Ballinger and a South Korean officer, and injured six other military personnel, five American and one South Korean. The tunnel had been discovered five days earlier.
- Lufthansa Flight 540 crashed in Nairobi, Kenya, due to a mechanical failure, killing 59 of its 157 passengers.
- John Stonehouse, British Member of Parliament for Walsall North, faked his own death, leaving a pile of clothes on Miami Beach to make it appear that he had drowned. He would be arrested on December 24 in Melbourne, Australia, and later imprisoned for three years for fraud, deception and theft.
- The NAACP Legal Defense and Educational Fund filed a class action lawsuit against NASA and the U.S. Civil Service Commission over alleged discrimination against African-Americans and women in hiring and promotion at Johnson Space Center in Houston, Texas.
- Born:
  - Drew Ginn, Australian rower, 3-time Olympic gold medalist; in Leongatha, Victoria
  - Kurt Krömer (stage name of Alexander Bojcan), German television presenter, comedian and actor; in West Berlin
- Died:
  - S. Everett Gleason, 69, American historian and intelligence analyst, died of lung cancer.
  - Ben West (born Raphael Benjamin West), 63, American attorney and politician, former Mayor of Nashville

== November 21, 1974 (Thursday) ==
- In Birmingham, England, two pubs on New Street were bombed, killing 21 people and injuring 182 others, many of them seriously, in an attack widely believed at the time to be linked to the Provisional Irish Republican Army. At 8:17 in the evening, a time bomb exploded at the Mulberry Bush pub, killing 10 people, two of whom had been walking past the establishment. Ten minutes later, at 8:27, another bomb detonated at the Tavern in the Town and killed 11 others. The bombings were the deadliest terrorist acts in Britain in the 20th century.
- The bombings were wrongly blamed on the "Birmingham Six", six men from Northern Ireland who were longtime residents of the city, who were coerced by police abuse into signing confessions to a crime that they had not committed. The six men— Hugh Callaghan, Paddy Joe Hill, Gerry Hunter, Richard McIlkenny, Billy Power and Johnny Walker— would be sentenced to life imprisonment on August 15, 1975, until their convictions were overturned by an appellate court on March 14, 1991. Later, a witness would identify Mick Murray as the organizer of the bombings.
- The U.S. Freedom of Information Act was amended after both Houses of Congress voted to override U.S. President Ford's October 17 veto.
- Japan's Ministry of Transport issued its "Ministerial Ordinance for Partial Revision of Safety Standards for Road Transport Vehicles" to require all motor vehicles manufactured in Japan to include a speed chime that would begin ringing if the vehicle exceeded 105 kilometres per hour (65 mph). Under pressure from other car-producing nations, the requirement would be removed in 1986.
- Died:
  - Sir William Andrewes KBE CB DSO, 75, Royal Navy admiral, Korean War commander of United Nations blockade and escort force
  - John B. Gambling, 77, English-born American radio broadcasting pioneer known for Rambling with Gambling
  - Frank Martin, 84, Swiss composer
  - Arthur J. Scanlan, 93, Irish-born American Roman Catholic priest, founding pastor of St. Helena's Church in the Bronx

== November 22, 1974 (Friday) ==
- United Nations General Assembly Resolution 3236 was enacted by a vote of 89 in favor, 8 against and 37 abstentions. The resolution declared its reaffirmation (after a 1948 resolution) of "the inalienable rights of the Palestinian people in Palestine, including...the right to self-determination without external interference; the right to national independence and sovereignty [and] the inalienable right of the Palestinians to return to their homes and property from which they have been displaced and uprooted." In a separate resolution, the General Assembly granted the Palestine Liberation Organization observer status as a representative of the Palestinian people in and around Israel.
- The opera Nélée et Myrthis, written by French composer Jean-Philippe Rameau, was given its first performance 223 years after it was written. The Victoria State Opera in Melbourne, Australia, staged the work that Rameau had completed in May of 1751.
- Died:
  - Gerald Maurice Clemence, 66, American astronomer
  - Ralph Capone, 80, Italian-born American mobster and the older brother of Al Capone and Frank Capone

== November 23, 1974 (Saturday) ==
- The Derg, which had carried out the Ethiopian Revolution in September and declared the Republic of Ethiopia, carried out the mass execution of 54 former government officials and military officers at Kerchele Prison, and sent soldiers to murder six others who were not incarcerated. The condemned officials, who had recently served the government of Emperor Haile Selassie, included Prime Ministers Aklilu Habte-Wold (who had served from 1961 until March 1974) and Endelkachew Makonnen (who served from March to July); General Aman Andom, 50, who had taken over in the September coup as the first President of Ethiopia; Rear Admiral Leul Iskinder Desta, a grandson of Selassie; Abiye Abebe, former Viceroy of Eritrea (1959–1964), President of the Senate (1964–1974) and Minister of Defense from February to July, 1974; Prince Asrate Medhin Kassa (Viceroy of Eritrea 1964 to 1970 and President of the Crown Council, 1971 to 1974); Admiral Iskinder Desta of the Imperial Ethiopian Navy; wealthy businessman and Lieutenant General Mesfin Sileshi; and Chief Justice Abeje Debalke. Six others were killed in a shootout at the home of General Andom.

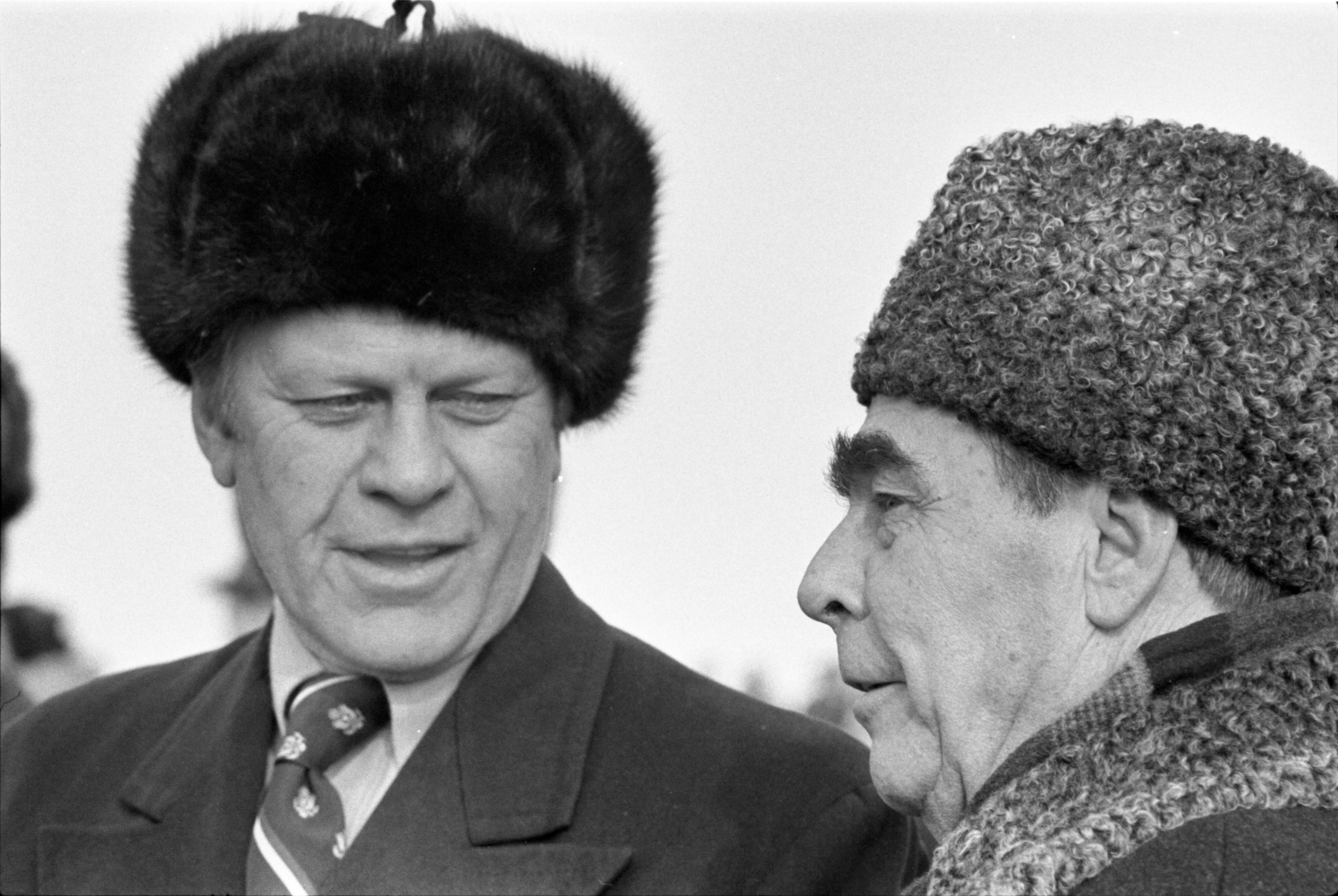
Brezhnev greeting Ford at Vozdvizhenka Airbase

- U.S. President Ford and Secretary of State Kissinger arrived in the Soviet Union at the Vozdvizhenka Airbase near Vladivostok, where they were greeted by Soviet Communist Party General Secretary Leonid Brezhnev and Foreign Minister Andrei Gromyko for a summit meeting on arms control.
- Aldo Moro took office as the Prime Minister of Italy. Moro, who had served as Prime Minister from 1963 to 1968, replaced Mariano Rumor, whose government collapsed on October 3 after the ministers could not agree on how to manage a rising inflation rate.
- In Lexington, Massachusetts, the historic Hancock–Clarke House was moved 100 yards (91 m) across the street to its original site in preparation for the United States Bicentennial.
- The Plaza de Toros Monumental de Aguascalientes, a bullring, opened in the Mexican city of Aguascalientes.
- The United Kingdom's Skynet 2B communications satellite was launched from the United States and placed into geostationary orbit over Kenya.
- Born: Saku Koivu, Finnish professional ice hockey centre with 89 games for the Finland men's national ice hockey team and 1,124 games in the National Hockey League between 1992 and 2014; in Turku
- Died:
  - Cornelius Ryan, 54, Irish-born American writer, died of cancer.
  - Sol Wilson, 81, Polish-born American Expressionist painter

== November 24, 1974 (Sunday) ==
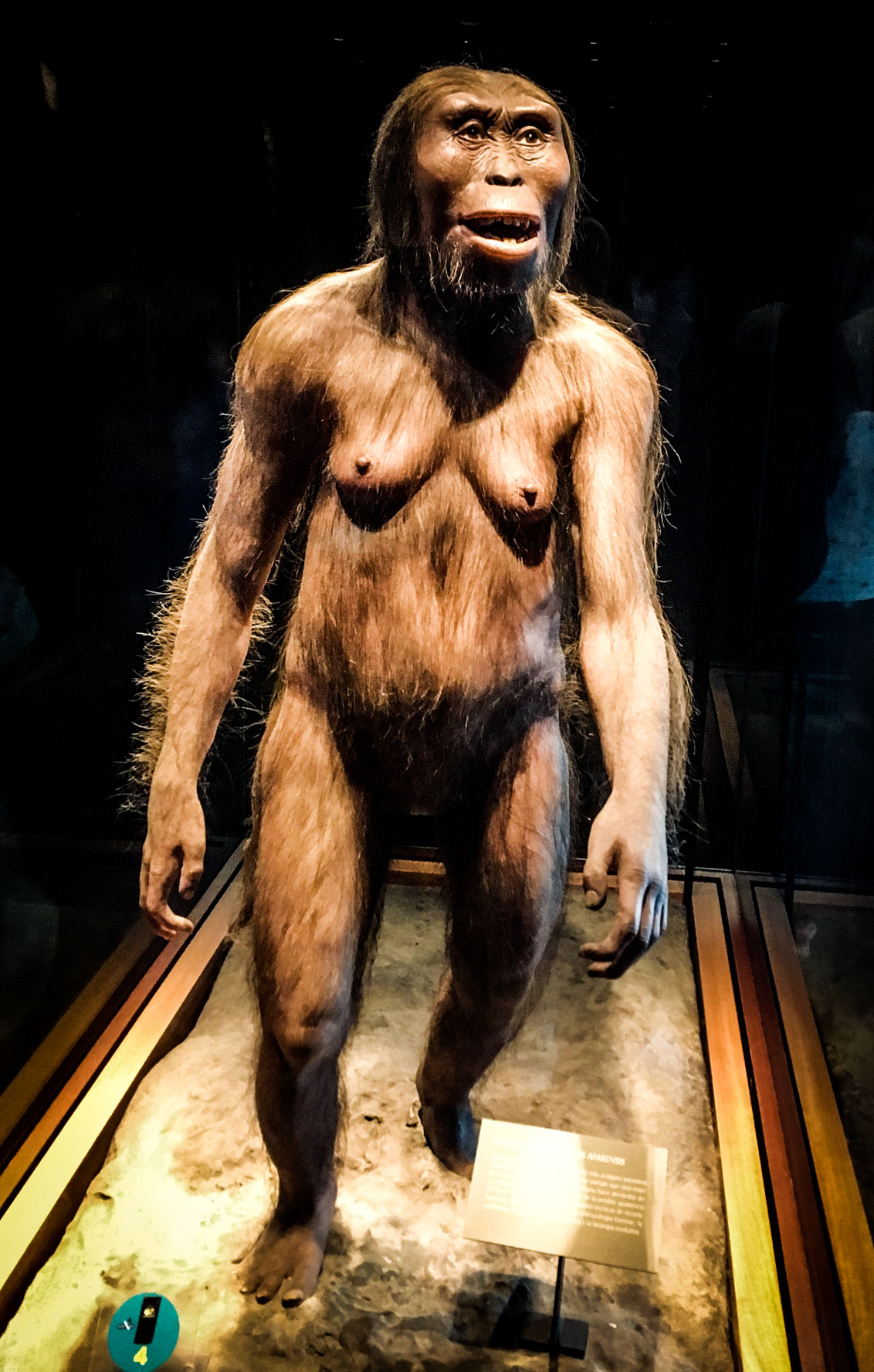
A reconstruction of "Lucy" at the Museum of Anthropology and History in Mexico City

- The remains of "Lucy", a female hominid from the species Australopithecus afarensis, were discovered in Ethiopia by paleoanthropologist Donald Johanson. Found in the Awash Valley of the Ethiopia's Afar Triangle near the town of Hadar, "Lucy" (officially "AL 288-1"), whose remains were carbon dated at 3.2 million years old, was the earliest example of an ancestor of homo sapiens who could walk upright on two feet.
- In Vladivostok in the Soviet Union, U.S. President Gerald Ford and Soviet General Secretary Leonid Brezhnev signed a Joint Communiqué pledging to limit both nations to an "agreed aggregate number" of nuclear missiles, with a specified number of strategic nuclear delivery vehicles (SNDVs), intercontinental ballistic missiles (ICBMs), and submarine-launched ballistic missiles (SLBMs) fitted with multiple independently targetable reentry vehicles (MIRVs).
- In the Grey Cup, the championship of the Canadian Football League, the Montreal Alouettes defeated the Edmonton Eskimos, 20 to 7, before 34,450 fans in Vancouver.
- Born: Stephen Merchant, English actor and comedian; in Bristol
- Died: Raymond Pace Alexander, 77, American civil rights leader, lawyer, and politician, first African American judge appointed to the Pennsylvania Court of Common Pleas, died of a heart attack.

== November 25, 1974 (Monday) ==
- The first "double heart" transplant on a human being was performed at the Groote Schuur Hospital in Cape Town, South Africa, by Dr. Christiaan Barnard, introducing a new technique of supplementing a diseased heart with a donor heart that "takes the brunt of pumping the blood through the body" while "the blood still passes through the patient's original heart." The first recipient, Ivan Taylor, received the donor heart of a 10-year-old girl. Taylor survived for four and a half months, dying on April 5, 1975.
- Four days after the Birmingham pub bombings, the Provisional Irish Republican Army (IRA) terrorist group carried out the placing of time bombs in and near letter dropboxes across London, each placed inside a pillar box. The first gelignite bomb exploded at a box at Caledonian Road at King's Cross. Ten minutes later, a bomb at the Piccadilly Circus road injured 16 people. Two days later, a larger bomb at a pillar box on Tite Street in Chelsea injured 20 people, including nine first responders.
- In Canada, André Desjardins, leader of the Fédération des travailleurs du Québec labor union, stepped down after being questioned in detail about his ties to organized crime.
- Born:
  - Kenneth Mitchell, Canadian television actor known for Jericho, who was diagnosed with amyotrophic lateral sclerosis prior to his retirement; in Toronto (d. 2024)
  - Sarah Monette, American novelist who used the pen name Katherine Addison in writing The Goblin Emperor; in Oak Ridge, Tennessee
- Died:
  - U Thant, 65, Burmese diplomat and 3rd Secretary-General of the United Nations, died of lung cancer.
  - Nick Drake, 26, British musician, died of an overdose of amitriptyline.
  - Joseph F. Farley, 85, U.S. Coast Guard admiral, former Commandant of the Coast Guard, died of cancer.
  - Rosemary Lane (stage name for Rosemary Mullican), 61, American actress and singer and one of the Lane Sisters, died of complications of pulmonary obstruction and diabetes.

== November 26, 1974 (Tuesday) ==
- Japan's Prime Minister Kakuei Tanaka announced his resignation after an invesigative committee of Japan's House of Representatives, the Diet, was preparing to call Aki Sato as a witness. Tanaka and Ms. Sato had been having a romantic relationship for many years. The announcement was made by Chief Cabinet Secretary (and future Prime Minister) Noboru Takeshita.
- In West Germany, teams of agents from the GSG 9 special forces made simultaneous raids targeted at arresting suspected members of the Red Army Faction terror group.
- After 22 years, the government of France lifted a ban that it had placed against the distribution of The Watchtower, the magazine of the Jehovah's Witnesses religious group.
- Anneline Kriel was crowned as Miss World 1974, the second South African to hold the title after Penny Coelen in 1958, when Helen Morgan resigned four days after winning the 24th Miss World pageant.
- Born: Roman Šebrle, Czech Olympic champion decathlete; in Lanškroun, Czechoslovakia
- Died:
  - Cyril Connolly CBE, 71, English literary critic and writer
  - Margaret Bradford Boni, 82, American music educator and folklorist
  - James McGuire, 63, Scottish-born American soccer player and real estate executive, two-time president of the United States Soccer Federation
  - Charles Rumford Walker, 81, American historian, political scientist, novelist and Yale University official

== November 27, 1974 (Wednesday) ==
- In Punjab, India, about 100 people were injured in a clash between police and 6,000 student demonstrators.
- In Moscow, plainclothes agents took Soviet physicist and dissident Andrei Tverdokhlebov, the secretary of the Soviet branch of Amnesty International, into custody as he walked home with a friend from a movie. Agents also searched Tverdokhlebov's apartment. The following day, Tverdokhlebov would issue a statement about the search of his apartment and the confiscation of various items, concluding, "However, they have not yet taken away my fountain pen."
- In one of the closest elections in the history of the United States Congress, a recount showed that Democrat John A. Durkin— initially declared to have lost the November 5 race for U.S. Senator for New Hampshire to Republican Louis C. Wyman by 355 votes (110,716 to 110,361)— was found to have actually won the race by 10 votes (110,924 to 110,914). Wyman filed an appeal to the state's Ballot Law Commission and on December 24, the second recount would show an even closer election.
- At W. K. Kellogg Airport in Battle Creek, Michigan, five members of the U.S. Navy were killed in the crash of a Navy plane on a training mission from Pensacola, Florida.
- Born: Wendy Houvenaghel, Northern Ireland-born British Olympic racing cyclist; in Magherafelt, County Londonderry, Northern Ireland
- Died: Agnes de Lima, 87, American writer on education

== November 28, 1974 (Thursday) ==
- Brigadier General Tafari Benti became the new Head of State of Ethiopia after he was named as the Chairman of the Derg, the military council that had executed the prior leader.
- The 2,450 delegates to the 11th Congress of the Romanian Communist Party unanimously re-elected Nicolae Ceaușescu to a five-year term as Secretary General of the party.
- Singer John Lennon gave his final live musical performance, appearing at New York's Madison Square Garden as the guest of Elton John. The two musicians appeared together to sing "I Saw Her Standing There". According to New York Times critic John Rockwell, "Not that the crowd hadn't given every indication of loving Mr. John and his music. But with Mr. Lennon, there was an electricity that sparked through the crowd long after Mr. Lennon had left the stage."
- Died:
  - Robert Gaudino, 49, American political scientist, died of a neurological disease.
  - Konstantin Melnikov, 84, Soviet architect

== November 29, 1974 (Friday) ==
- The first Prevention of Terrorism (Temporary Provisions) Act in the United Kingdom was given royal assent by Queen Elizabeth II, eight days after the Birmingham pub bombings, hours after the measure passed the House of Commons and the House of Lords.
- The French National Assembly, after a 30-hour debate that included a speech by Simone Veil, voted 284 to 189 to pass a bill legalizing abortion in France. The French Senate would ratify the bill on December 1, "making France the first nation of Latin and Catholic background to legalize abortion."
- U.S. President Ford pardoned 8 men convicted of resistance to the Vietnam War and granted conditional clemency to 10 others. Most of the men had been in prison for refusal to enter military service.
- The National Guard of El Salvador invaded the town of La Cayetanan, near Tecoluca in the San Vicente Department, then rounded up and executed six peasants who were members of the Federation of Christian Peasants of El Salvador (FECCAS), and arrested another 13 who were not seen again.
- Born: Ferenc Merkli, Hungarian Slovene priest, writer and translator; in Szentgotthárd
- Died:
  - General Peng Dehuai, 76, Chinese military leader, former Minister of National Defense for the People's Republic of China (1954 to 1959), died in a prison in Beijing, where he had been imprisoned during the 1966 Cultural Revolution.
  - James J. Braddock, 69, American boxer who was the world heavyweight champion from 1935 to 1937, later profiled in the 2005 biographical film Cinderella Man.
  - H. L. Hunt, 85, American ultraconservative oil tycoon and billionaire
  - Ouida Bergère (born Eunie Branch), 87, American screenwriter and actress, widow of Basil Rathbone
  - Paul Frederick Brissenden, 89, American labor historian
  - Sir Douglas Menzies KBE, 67, Justice of the High Court of Australia since 1958, died while attending a Bar Association dinner in Sydney.

== November 30, 1974 (Saturday) ==
- During a preliminary race for the following day's Macau Grand Prix, West German driver Dieter Glemser lost control of his car, which ran into the crowd, killing a child and injuring 6 other people.
- Mathieu Kérékou, the President of the Republic of Dahomey since leading a coup d'état in 1972, surprised the West African nation's citizens by announcing that Dahomey would become a "people's republic" guided by the principles of Marxism-Leninism, and allied with the Soviet Union. On the first anniversary of his speech, he renamed the country as the People's Republic of Benin.

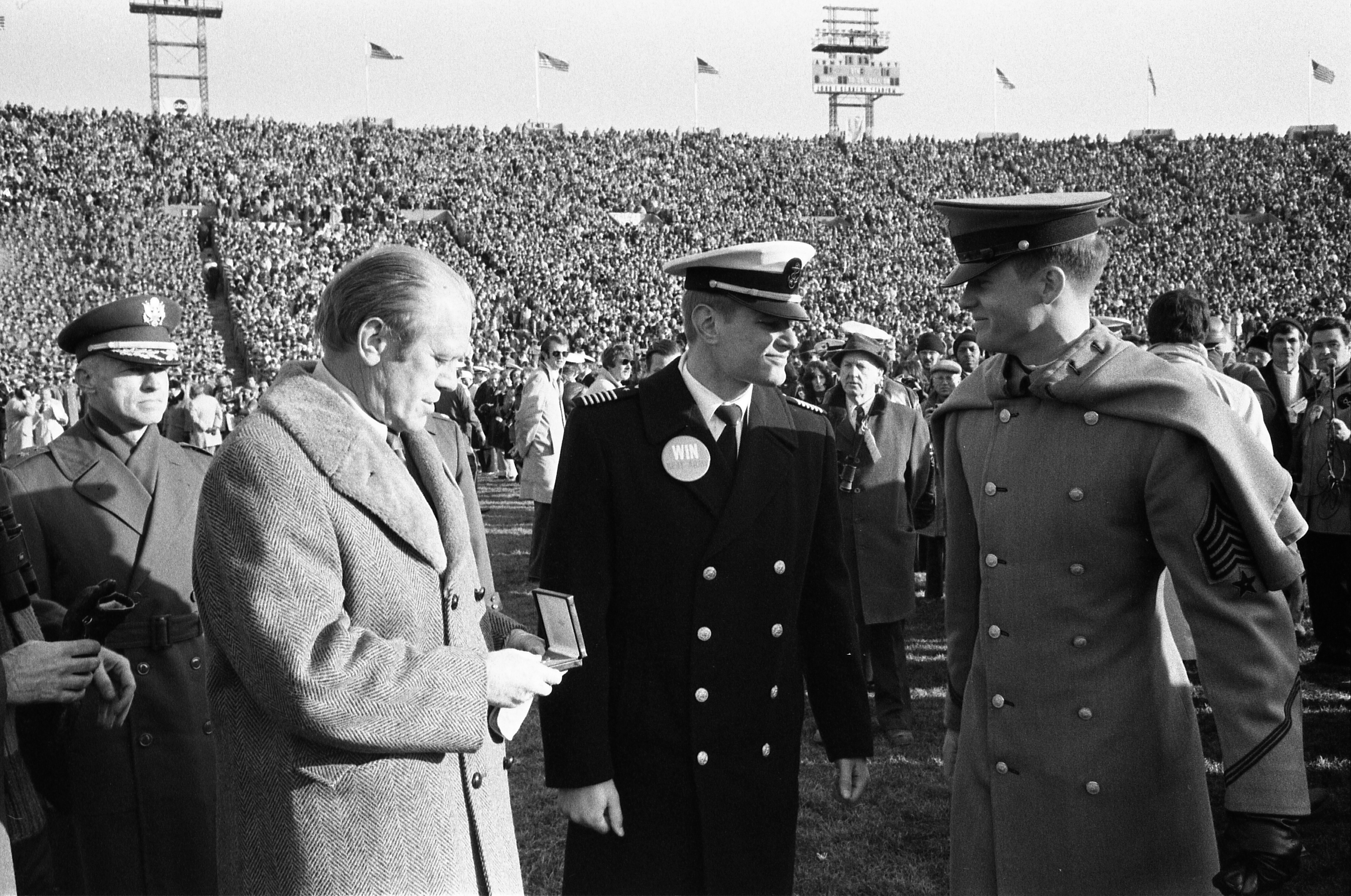
U.S. President Ford at the 75th Army–Navy Game

- U.S. President Ford attended the 75th Army–Navy Game at John F. Kennedy Stadium in Philadelphia. Navy defeated Army by a score of 19–0.
- U.S. Representative Wilbur Mills of Arkansas, chairman of the powerful Ways and Means Committee of the U.S. House of Representatives, caused an embarrassing scene when he arrived, intoxicated, at The Pilgrim Theatre in Boston, and walked on the stage where his mistress, Fanne Foxe, was performing as a stripper. The scandal followed an October 7 incident where he and Foxe were stopped by police of the U.S. Park Service while he was drunk. Mills stepped down as the Ways and Means Committee Chairman days later and retired from Congress after choosing not to run for re-election in 1976.
- Born: Wallace Chung, Hong Kong actor and singer; in British Hong Kong
