= November 23 =

November 23 this year in various calendars
- Monday, 23 November 2026
Akan	Kwadwo
Armenian	6 Kʿaloch 1476
Aztec	Tlacaxipehualiztli 12, 6 Cōātl
Babylonian	12 Arakhsamna, 2337 SE
Balinese pawukon	Menga, Beteng, Jaya, Wage, Was, Coma of Kulantir, Kala, Jangur, Dewa
Bengali	8 Ogrohayon, BS 1433
Chinese	Yin Metal Ox・Roof Mansion; Fire Horse Year, Month 10, Day 15 (Xiaoxue, 14 days until Daxue)
Common Era	23 November 2026 CE
Coptic	14 Hathor, AM 1743
Egyptian	11 Pharmuthi, 2775 NE
Ethiopian	14 H̱edār, 2019 Amätä Məhrät
French Republican	Décade I, Duodi de Frimaire de l'Année 235 de la République
Gregorian	23 November, AD 2026
Hebrew	13 Kislev, AM 5787
Hindu	Bharaṇī・Varīyas; Solar: 7 Mārgaśīrṣa, 1948 SE; Lunisolar: Caturdaśī, Śukla pakṣa of Kārtika, 2083 VE; Rāudra・5127 KY・1,872,902
Icelandic	Mánudagur, 1 Ýlir 2026
Islamic	12 Jumada al-thani, AH 1448 (using tabular method)
ISO week date	2026-W48-1
Japanese	15 Kannazuki, Reiwa 8 (Shōsetsu, 14 days until Taisetsu)
Julian	10 November, AD 2026 (AM 7535)
Julian day	2461368
Korean	15 Dwaejidal, 4359 DE
Maya	13.0.14.2.5; 18 Ceh, 6 Chicchan
Roman	ante diem IV Idus Novembres, MMDCCLXXIX AUC
Solar Hijri	2 Azar, SH 1405
Tibetan	14 smin drug, me pho rta 2153 or 1772 or 1000

<<	November					>>
Su	Mo	Tu	We	Th	Fr	Sa
1	2	3	4	5	6	7
8	9	10	11	12	13	14
15	16	17	18	19	20	21
22	23	24	25	26	27	28
29	30
2026

November 23 in recent years
2025 (Sunday)
2024 (Saturday)
2023 (Thursday)
2022 (Wednesday)
2021 (Tuesday)
2020 (Monday)
2019 (Saturday)
2018 (Friday)
2017 (Thursday)
2016 (Wednesday)

November 23 is the 327th day of the year (328th in leap years) in the Gregorian calendar; 38 days remain until the end of the year.

== Events ==
=== Pre-1600 ===
- 534 BC – Thespis of Icaria becomes the first recorded actor to portray a character on stage.
- 375 – 16-year-old Gratian is proclaimed augustus following the death of his father Valentinian I, though a couple of days later his half-brother Valentinian is also proclaimed augustus and becomes his co-ruler.
- 602 – Phocas is crowned Byzantine emperor after a rebellion of the Thracian army against reigning emperor Maurice and after Phocas' rival Germanus has been rebuffed by the Greens.
- 1059 – Constantine X Doukas becomes Byzantine emperor, with his son Michael as nominal co-emperor and Michael Psellos as chief minister.
- 1248 – Conquest of Seville by Christian troops under King Ferdinand III of Castile.
- 1499 – Seven days after being convicted of treason, Perkin Warbeck, a pretender to the throne of England, is hanged for attempting to escape from the Tower of London; his supporter John Atwater is executed with him.
- 1589 – Marriage of king James VI of Scotland and Anne of Denmark.

=== 1601–1900 ===
- 1644 – John Milton publishes Areopagitica, a pamphlet decrying censorship.
- 1733 – The start of the 1733 slave insurrection on St. John in what was then the Danish West Indies.
- 1808 – French and Poles defeat the Spanish at Battle of Tudela.
- 1863 – American Civil War: Battle of Chattanooga begins: Union forces led by General Ulysses S. Grant reinforce troops at Chattanooga, Tennessee, and counter-attack Confederate troops.
- 1867 – The Manchester Martyrs are hanged in Manchester, England, for killing a police officer while freeing two Irish Republican Brotherhood members from custody.
- 1876 – Corrupt Tammany Hall leader William Magear Tweed (better known as Boss Tweed) is delivered to authorities in New York City after being captured in Spain.
- 1890 – King William III of the Netherlands dies without a male heir and a special law is passed to allow his daughter Princess Wilhelmina to succeed him.

=== 1901–present ===
- 1910 – Johan Alfred Ander becomes the last person to be executed in Sweden.
- 1914 – Mexican Revolution: The last of U.S. forces withdraw from Veracruz, occupied seven months earlier in response to the Tampico Affair.
- 1921 – Warren G. Harding, 29th President of the United States, signs the Willis–Campbell Act into law, prohibiting doctors from prescribing beer or liquor for medicinal purposes.
- 1923 – Thousands of Irish Republicans end the 1923 Irish hunger strikes, five die from starvation.
- 1924 – Edwin Hubble's discovery, that the Andromeda "nebula" is actually another island galaxy far outside our own Milky Way, is first published in The New York Times.
- 1934 – An Anglo-Ethiopian boundary commission in the Ogaden discovers an Italian garrison at Walwal, well within Ethiopian territory. This leads to the Abyssinia Crisis.
- 1939 – World War II: HMS Rawalpindi is sunk by the German battleships Scharnhorst and Gneisenau.
- 1940 – World War II: Romania becomes a signatory of the Tripartite Pact, officially joining the Axis powers.
- 1942 – World War II: The British passenger liner SS Tilawa is torpedoed and sunk by Japanese submarine I-29, with 280 passengers and crew killed out of 954 on board.
- 1943 – World War II: The Deutsche Opernhaus on Bismarckstraße in the Berlin neighborhood of Charlottenburg is destroyed. It will eventually be rebuilt in 1961 and be called the Deutsche Oper Berlin.
- 1943 – World War II: Tarawa and Makin atolls fall to American forces.
- 1944 – World War II: The Lotta Svärd Movement is disbanded under the terms of the armistice treaty in Finland after the Continuation War.
- 1946 – French naval bombardment of Hai Phong, Vietnam, kills thousands of civilians.
- 1955 – The Cocos Islands are transferred from the control of the United Kingdom to that of Australia.
- 1959 – French President Charles de Gaulle declares in a speech in Strasbourg his vision for "Europe, from the Atlantic to the Urals".
- 1963 – The first episode of Doctor Who ("An Unearthly Child") is broadcast by the BBC, which is now the world's longest running science fiction drama.
- 1971 – Representatives of the People's Republic of China attend the United Nations, including the United Nations Security Council, for the first time.
- 1972 – The Soviet Union makes its final attempt at launching the N1 rocket.
- 1974 – Sixty Ethiopian politicians, aristocrats, military officers, and other persons are executed by the provisional military government.
- 1976 – Jacques Mayol is the first man to reach a depth of 100 m (330 ft) undersea without breathing equipment.
- 1978 – Cyclone kills about 1,000 people in eastern Sri Lanka.
- 1978 – The Geneva Frequency Plan of 1975 goes into effect, realigning many of Europe's longwave and mediumwave broadcasting frequencies.
- 1980 – The 6.9 M_{w} Irpinia earthquake shakes southern Italy with a maximum Mercalli intensity of X (Extreme), killing 2,483–4,900, and injuring 7,700–8,934.
- 1981 – Iran–Contra affair: Ronald Reagan signs the top secret National Security Decision Directive 17 (NSDD-17), giving the Central Intelligence Agency the authority to recruit and support Contra rebels in Nicaragua.
- 1985 – Gunmen hijack EgyptAir Flight 648 en route from Athens to Cairo. When the plane lands in Malta, Egyptian commandos storm the aircraft, but 60 people die in the raid.
- 1991 – Queen lead singer Freddie Mercury announces in a statement that he is HIV-positive. He dies the following day.
- 1992 – The first smartphone, the IBM Simon, is introduced at COMDEX in Las Vegas, Nevada.
- 1996 – Ethiopian Airlines Flight 961 is hijacked, then crashes into the Indian Ocean off the coast of Comoros after running out of fuel, killing 125.
- 2001 – The Budapest Convention on Cybercrime is signed in Budapest, Hungary.
- 2002 – Space Shuttle Endeavour launches on STS-113 to the International Space Station carrying the Expedition 6 crew and the P1 truss.
- 2003 – Rose Revolution: Georgian president Eduard Shevardnadze resigns following weeks of mass protests over flawed elections.
- 2004 – The Holy Trinity Cathedral of Tbilisi, the largest religious building in Georgia, is consecrated.
- 2005 – Ellen Johnson Sirleaf is elected president of Liberia and becomes the first woman to lead an African country.
- 2006 – A series of bombings kills at least 215 people and injures 257 others in Sadr City, making it the second deadliest sectarian attack since the beginning of the Iraq War in 2003.
- 2007 – MS Explorer, a cruise liner carrying 154 people, sinks in the Antarctic Ocean south of Argentina after hitting an iceberg near the South Shetland Islands. There are no fatalities.
- 2009 – The Maguindanao massacre occurs in Ampatuan, Philippines; 58 opponents of Andal Ampatuan Jr. are kidnapped and killed.
- 2010 – Bombardment of Yeonpyeong: North Korean artillery attack kills two civilians and two marines on Yeonpyeong Island, South Korea.
- 2011 – Arab Spring: After 11 months of protests in Yemen, Yemeni president Ali Abdullah Saleh signs a deal to transfer power to the vice president, in exchange for legal immunity.
- 2015 – Blue Origin's New Shepard space vehicle became the first rocket to successfully fly to space and then return to Earth for a controlled, vertical landing.
- 2018 – Founders of Italian fashion brand Dolce & Gabbana issue an apology following a series of offensive advertisements on social media promoting a fashion show in Shanghai, China, which was canceled.
- 2019 – The last Sumatran rhinoceros in Malaysia, Imam, dies, making the species officially extinct in the country.

== Births ==
=== Pre-1600 ===
- 870 – Alexander, Byzantine emperor (died 913)
- 912 – Otto I, Holy Roman Emperor (died 973)
- 1190 – Pope Clement IV (died 1268)
- 1221 – Alfonso X of Castile (died 1284)
- 1402 – Jean de Dunois, French soldier (died 1468)
- 1417 – William FitzAlan, 16th Earl of Arundel, English politician (died 1487)
- 1496 – Clément Marot, French poet (died 1544)
- 1508 – Francis, Duke of Brunswick-Lüneburg, youngest son of Henry the Middle (died 1549)
- 1553 – Prospero Alpini, Italian physician and botanist (died 1617)

=== 1601–1900 ===
- 1632 – Jean Mabillon, French monk and scholar (died 1707)
- 1641 – Anthonie Heinsius, Dutch lawyer and politician (died 1720)
- 1687 – Jean Baptiste Senaillé, French violinist and composer (died 1730)
- 1705 – Thomas Birch, English historian and author (died 1766)
- 1715 – Pierre Charles Le Monnier, French astronomer and author (died 1799)
- 1719 – Spranger Barry, Irish actor (died 1777)
- 1749 – Edward Rutledge, American captain and politician, 39th Governor of South Carolina (died 1800)
- 1760 – François-Noël Babeuf, French journalist and activist (died 1797)
- 1781 – Theodor Valentin Volkmar, German lawyer and politician, 1st Mayor of Marburg (died 1847)
- 1785 – Jan Roothaan, Dutch priest, 21st Superior-General of the Society of Jesus (died 1853)
- 1803 – Theodore Dwight Weld, American author and activist (died 1895)
- 1804 – Franklin Pierce, American general, lawyer, and politician, 14th President of the United States (died 1869)
- 1820 – Isaac Todhunter, English mathematician and author (died 1884)
- 1837 – Johannes Diderik van der Waals, Dutch physicist and thermodynamicist, Nobel Prize laureate (died 1923)
- 1838 – Stephanos Skouloudis, Greek banker and politician, 97th Prime Minister of Greece (died 1928)
- 1858 – Albert Ranft, Swedish actor and director (died 1938)
- 1860 – Hjalmar Branting, Swedish journalist and politician, 16th Prime Minister of Sweden, Nobel Prize laureate (died 1925)
- 1864 – Henry Bourne Joy, American businessman (died 1936)
- 1868 – Mary Brewster Hazelton, American painter (died 1953)
- 1869 – Valdemar Poulsen, Danish engineer (died 1942)
- 1869 – Johan Scharffenberg, Norwegian psychiatrist (died 1965)
- 1871 – Signe Salén, Swedish doctor (died 1963)
- 1871 – William Watt, Australian accountant and politician, 24th Premier of Victoria (died 1946)
- 1875 – Anatoly Lunacharsky, Russian journalist and politician (died 1933)
- 1876 – Sara Prinsep, British salon organiser (died 1959)
- 1876 – Manuel de Falla, Spanish pianist and composer (died 1946)
- 1878 – Frank Pick, English lawyer and businessman (died 1941)
- 1883 – José Clemente Orozco, Mexican painter (died 1949)
- 1886 – Eduards Smiļģis, Latvian actor and director (died 1966)
- 1887 – Boris Karloff, English actor (died 1969)
- 1887 – Henry Moseley, English physicist and chemist (died 1915)
- 1888 – Harpo Marx, American comedian and musician (died 1964)
- 1889 – Harry Sunderland, Australian-English journalist and businessman (died 1964)
- 1890 – El Lissitzky, Russian photographer and architect (died 1941)
- 1892 – Erté, Russian-French illustrator and designer (died 1990)
- 1896 – Klement Gottwald, Czechoslovak politician, President of the Czechoslovak Socialist Republic (died 1953)
- 1896 – Tsunenohana Kan'ichi, Japanese sumo wrestler, the 31st Yokozuna (died 1960)
- 1897 – Nirad C. Chaudhuri, British-Indian historian, author, and critic (died 1999)
- 1897 – Karl Gebhardt, German physician and war criminal (died 1948)
- 1897 – Pepita Not, Catalan anarchist activist (died 1938)
- 1899 – Manuel dos Reis Machado, Brazilian martial artist and educator (died 1974)

=== 1901–present ===
- 1901 – Bennie Osler, South African rugby player (died 1962)
- 1902 – Aaron Bank, American colonel (died 2004)
- 1902 – Victor Jory, Canadian-American actor (died 1982)
- 1903 – Joe Nibloe, Scottish footballer (died 1976)
- 1905 – K. Alvapillai, Sri Lankan civil servant (died 1979)
- 1906 – Betti Alver, Estonian author and poet (died 1989)
- 1907 – Lars Leksell, Swedish physician and neurosurgeon (died 1986)
- 1907 – Run Run Shaw, Chinese-Hong Kong businessman and philanthropist, founded Shaw Brothers Studio and TVB (died 2014)
- 1908 – Nelson S. Bond, American author and playwright (died 2006)
- 1909 – Nigel Tranter, Scottish historian and author (died 2000)
- 1912 – George O'Hanlon, American actor and screenwriter (died 1989)
- 1914 – Donald Nixon, American businessman (died 1987)
- 1914 – Wilson Tucker, American projectionist and author (died 2006)
- 1915 – Anne Burns, British aeronautical engineer and glider pilot (died 2001)
- 1915 – John Dehner, American actor (died 1992)
- 1915 – Marc Simont, French-American illustrator (died 2013)
- 1916 – Michael Gough, Malaysian-English actor (died 2011)
- 1916 – P. K. Page, English-Canadian author and poet (died 2010)
- 1920 – Paul Celan, Romanian-French poet and translator (died 1970)
- 1921 – Fred Buscaglione, Italian singer and actor (died 1960)
- 1921 – Elyakim Schlesinger, Austrian-born British Orthodox rabbi (died 2026)
- 1922 – Manuel Fraga Iribarne, Spanish politician, 3rd President of the Xunta of Galicia (died 2012)
- 1922 – Võ Văn Kiệt, Vietnamese soldier and politician, 6th Prime Minister of Vietnam (died 2008)
- 1923 – Daniel Brewster, American colonel, lawyer, and politician (died 2007)
- 1923 – Julien J. LeBourgeois, American admiral (died 2012)
- 1923 – Gloria Whelan, American author and poet
- 1924 – Irvin J. Borowsky, American publisher and philanthropist (died 2014)
- 1924 – Josephine D'Angelo, American baseball player and educator (died 2013)
- 1924 – Paula Raymond, American model and actress (died 2003)
- 1924 – Colin Turnbull, English-American anthropologist and author (died 1994)
- 1925 – José Napoleón Duarte, Salvadoran engineer and politician, President of El Salvador (died 1990)
- 1925 – Johnny Mandel, American composer and conductor (died 2020)
- 1925 – William Tebeau, African-American engineer (died 2013)
- 1926 – Sathya Sai Baba, Indian guru and philosopher (died 2011)
- 1926 – R. L. Burnside, American singer-songwriter and guitarist (died 2005)
- 1927 – John Cole, Irish-English journalist and author (died 2013)
- 1927 – Guy Davenport, American author and scholar (died 2005)
- 1927 – Angelo Sodano, Italian cardinal (died 2022)
- 1928 – Jerry Bock, American composer (died 2010)
- 1928 – John Coleman, Australian rules footballer and coach (died 1973)
- 1928 – Elmarie Wendel, American actress and singer (died 2018)
- 1928 – Brendan Pereira, Indian advertising executive (died 2024)
- 1929 – Hal Lindsey, American evangelist and Christian writer (died 2024)
- 1930 – Geeta Dutt, Indian singer and actress (died 1972)
- 1930 – Jack McKeon, American baseball player and manager
- 1932 – Renato Martino, Italian Roman Catholic cardinal (died 2024)
- 1932 – Michel David-Weill, French-American banker (died 2022)
- 1933 – Krzysztof Penderecki, Polish composer and conductor (died 2020)
- 1933 – Ali Shariati, Iranian sociologist and activist (died 1977)
- 1934 – Lew Hoad, Australian tennis player (died 1994)
- 1934 – Robert Towne, American actor, director, and screenwriter (died 2024)
- 1934 – James R. Hogg, American admiral (died 2025)
- 1935 – Ken Eastwood, Australian cricketer
- 1935 – Vladislav Volkov, Russian engineer and astronaut (died 1971)
- 1938 – Patrick Kelly, English archbishop
- 1939 – Betty Everett, American singer and pianist (died 2001)
- 1940 – Luis Tiant, Cuban-American baseball player and coach (died 2024)
- 1941 – Alan Mullery, English footballer and manager
- 1941 – Franco Nero, Italian actor and producer
- 1942 – Susan Anspach, American actress (died 2018)
- 1943 – Andrew Goodman, American activist (died 1964)
- 1943 – Sue Nicholls, English actress
- 1943 – David Nolan, American activist and politician (died 2010)
- 1943 – Petar Skansi, Croatian basketball player and coach (died 2022)
- 1944 – Joe Eszterhas, Hungarian-American screenwriter and producer
- 1944 – Peter Lindbergh, German-French photographer and director (died 2019)
- 1944 – James Toback, American actor, director, and screenwriter
- 1945 – Assi Dayan, Israeli actor, director, and screenwriter (died 2014)
- 1945 – Jim Doyle, American lawyer and politician, 44th Governor of Wisconsin
- 1945 – Tony Pond, English racing driver (died 2002)
- 1946 – Diana Quick, English actress
- 1946 – Bobby Rush, American activist and politician
- 1947 – Jean-Pierre Foucault, French radio and television host
- 1948 – Bård Breivik, Norwegian sculptor and art instructor (died 2016)
- 1948 – Bruce Vilanch, American actor and screenwriter
- 1948 – Frank Worthington, English footballer and manager (died 2021)
- 1949 – Alan Paul, American singer-songwriter and actor
- 1949 – Sandra Stevens, English singer
- 1950 – Nrisingha Prasad Bhaduri, Indian indologist, author, and academic
- 1950 – Carlos Eire, Cuban-born American author and academic
- 1950 – Charles Schumer, American lawyer and politician
- 1950 – Paul Wilson, Scottish footballer (died 2017)
- 1951 – Maik Galakos, Greek footballer and manager
- 1953 – Rick Bayless, American chef and author
- 1953 – Francis Cabrel, French singer-songwriter and guitarist
- 1953 – Johan de Meij, Dutch trombonist, composer, and conductor
- 1953 – Martin Kent, Australian cricketer
- 1954 – Pete Allen, English clarinet player and saxophonist
- 1954 – Glenn Brummer, American baseball player
- 1954 – Bruce Hornsby, American singer-songwriter and pianist
- 1954 – Aavo Pikkuus, Estonian cyclist
- 1955 – Steven Brust, American singer-songwriter, drummer, and author
- 1955 – Ludovico Einaudi, Italian pianist and composer
- 1955 – Mary Landrieu, American politician
- 1956 – Bruce Edgar, New Zealand cricketer
- 1956 – Shane Gould, Australian swimmer and coach
- 1956 – Karin Guthke, German diver
- 1957 – Andrew Toney, American basketball player
- 1958 – Martin Snedden, New Zealand cricketer and lawyer
- 1959 – Maxwell Caulfield, English-American actor
- 1960 – Robin Roberts, American sportscaster and journalist
- 1961 – Keith Ablow, American psychiatrist and author
- 1961 – Nicolas Bacri, French composer
- 1961 – Merv Hughes, Australian cricketer
- 1961 – Peter Stanford, English journalist and author
- 1962 – Nicolás Maduro, Venezuelan union leader and politician, President of Venezuela
- 1963 – Arto Heiskanen, Finnish professional hockey player (died 2023)
- 1963 – Gwynne Shotwell, American businesswoman, President and Chief Operating Officer of SpaceX
- 1964 – Steve Alford, American basketball player and coach
- 1964 – Marilyn Kidd, Australian rower
- 1964 – Frank Rutherford, Bahamian triple jumper
- 1965 – Jennifer Michael Hecht, American historian, author, and poet
- 1966 – Vincent Cassel, French actor and producer
- 1966 – Kevin Gallacher, Scottish footballer and sportscaster
- 1966 – Michelle Gomez, Scottish actress
- 1966 – Jerry Kelly, American golfer
- 1966 – Mark Robinson, English cricketer and coach
- 1967 – Gary Kirsten, South African cricketer and coach
- 1967 – Salli Richardson, American actress, director, and producer
- 1968 – Miloš Babić, Serbian basketball player
- 1968 – Robert Denmark, English runner and coach
- 1968 – Anthony Sullivan, English rugby league and union player
- 1968 – Kirsty Young, Scottish journalist
- 1969 – Olivier Beretta, Monégasque racing driver
- 1969 – Mike Lünsmann, German footballer
- 1969 – Robin Padilla, Filipino actor, martial artist, and screenwriter
- 1970 – Zoë Ball, English radio and television host
- 1970 – Oded Fehr, Israeli-American actor
- 1970 – Danny Hoch, American actor and screenwriter
- 1970 – Karsten Müller, German chess player and author
- 1971 – Khaled Al-Muwallid, Saudi Arabian footballer
- 1971 – Ashraf Amaya, American basketball player
- 1971 – Vin Baker, American basketball player and coach
- 1971 – Chris Hardwick, American comedian, actor, producer, and television host
- 1972 – Christopher James Adler, American drummer
- 1972 – Alf-Inge Haaland, Norwegian footballer
- 1972 – Kurupt, American rapper and producer
- 1972 – Helen Luz, Brazilian basketball player
- 1974 – Saku Koivu, Finnish ice hockey player
- 1974 – Malik Rose, American basketball player, sportscaster, and executive
- 1976 – Page Kennedy, American actor and rapper
- 1976 – Tony Renna, American race car driver (died 2003)
- 1976 – Murat Salar, German-Turkish footballer and manager
- 1976 – Kohei Suwama, Japanese wrestler
- 1977 – Myriam Boileau, Canadian diver
- 1977 – Adam Eaton, American baseball player
- 1979 – Kelly Brook, English model and actress
- 1979 – Ivica Kostelić, Croatian skier
- 1980 – Ishmael Beah, Sierra Leonean child soldier and American author
- 1980 – Jonathan Papelbon, American baseball player
- 1980 – Kirk Penney, New Zealand basketball player
- 1982 – Colby Armstrong, Canadian ice hockey player
- 1982 – Asafa Powell, Jamaican sprinter
- 1983 – Fatih Yiğituşağı, Turkish footballer
- 1984 – Hilton Armstrong, American basketball player
- 1984 – Lucas Grabeel, American actor, singer, and songwriter
- 1984 – Amruta Khanvilkar, Indian actress and dancer
- 1984 – Justin Turner, American baseball player
- 1985 – Viktor An, South Korean speed skater
- 1987 – Nicklas Bäckström, Swedish ice hockey player
- 1987 – Snooki, American reality television personality
- 1990 – Shaun Hutchinson, English footballer
- 1990 – Eddy Kim, South Korean singer-songwriter and guitarist
- 1990 – Alena Leonova, Russian figure skater
- 1990 – Christopher Quiring, German footballer
- 1991 – Christian Cueva, Peruvian footballer
- 1991 – Willian José, Brazilian footballer
- 1991 – Ahmed Shehzad, Pakistani cricketer
- 1992 – Miley Cyrus, American singer-songwriter and actress
- 1992 – Gabriel Landeskog, Swedish ice hockey player
- 1994 – Wes Burns, Welsh footballer
- 1995 – Kelly Rosen, Estonian footballer
- 1996 – Alexis Ren, American social media personality, model, and actress
- 1996 – James Maddison, English footballer
- 1996 – Anna Yanovskaya, Russian ice dancer
- 1998 – Caoimhín Kelleher, Irish footballer
- 1999 – Boubacar Kamara, French footballer
- 2001 – Tino Anjorin, English footballer

== Deaths ==
=== Pre-1600 ===
- 386 – Jin Feidi, emperor of the Jin Dynasty (born 342)
- 947 – Berthold, Duke of Bavaria (born 900)
- 955 – Eadred, English king (born 923)
- 1161 – Adam, Abbot of Ebrach
- 1183 – William Fitz Robert, 2nd Earl of Gloucester (born 1116)
- 1407 – Louis I, Duke of Orléans (born 1372)
- 1457 – Ladislaus the Posthumous, Hungarian king (born 1440)
- 1464 – Blessed Margaret of Savoy (born 1390)
- 1499 – Perkin Warbeck, pretender to the English throne (born c. 1474)
- 1503 – Bona of Savoy (born 1449)
- 1503 – Margaret of York (born 1446)
- 1534 – Beatriz Galindo, Spanish Latinist and educator (born c. 1465)
- 1572 – Bronzino, Italian painter and poet (born 1503)
- 1585 – Thomas Tallis, English composer (born c.1505)

=== 1601–1900 ===
- 1616 – Richard Hakluyt, English priest and author (born 1552)
- 1682 – Claude Lorrain, French-Italian painter and engraver (born 1604)
- 1763 – Friedrich Heinrich von Seckendorff, German field marshal and diplomat (born 1673)
- 1769 – Constantine Mavrocordatos, Greek prince (born 1711)
- 1803 – Roger Newdigate, English politician (born 1719)
- 1804 – Richard Graves, English minister and author (born 1715)
- 1804 – Ivan Mane Jarnović, Italian violinist and composer (born 1747)
- 1807 – Jean-François Rewbell, French lawyer and politician (born 1747)
- 1814 – Elbridge Gerry, American merchant and politician, 5th Vice President of the United States (born 1744)
- 1844 – Thomas Henderson, Scottish astronomer (born 1798)
- 1833 – Jean-Baptiste Jourdan, French general and politician, French Minister of Foreign Affairs (born 1762)
- 1890 – William III of the Netherlands (born 1817)
- 1896 – Ichiyō Higuchi, Japanese writer (born 1872)
- 1899 – Thomas Henry Ismay, English businessman, founded White Star Line (born 1837)

=== 1901–present ===
- 1905 – John Burdon-Sanderson, English physiologist and academic (born 1828)
- 1907 – Naimuddin, Bengali writer and Islamic scholar (born 1832)
- 1910 – Hawley Harvey Crippen, American physician and murderer (born 1862)
- 1923 – Andy O'Sullivan, Irish Republican died on hunger strike
- 1934 – Giovanni Brunero, Italian cyclist (born 1895)
- 1937 – Jagadish Chandra Bose, Indian physicist, biologist, botanist, and archaeologist (born 1858)
- 1937 – George Albert Boulenger, Belgian-English zoologist and botanist (born 1858)
- 1940 – Stanley Argyle, Australian politician, 32nd Premier of Victoria (born 1867)
- 1958 – Nikolaos Georgantas, Greek discus thrower (born 1880)
- 1966 – Seán T. O'Kelly, Irish politician, 2nd President of Ireland (born 1882)
- 1970 – Yusof Ishak, Singaporean journalist and politician, 1st President of Singapore (born 1910)
- 1972 – Marie Wilson, American actress (born 1916)
- 1973 – Sessue Hayakawa, Japanese actor, director, and producer (born 1889)
- 1974 – Notable victims of the Massacre of the Sixty:
  - Abiye Abebe, Ethiopian general and politician (born 1918)
  - Aman Andom, Ethiopian general and politician, President of Ethiopia (born 1924)
  - Aklilu Habte-Wold, Ethiopian politician, Prime Minister of Ethiopia (born 1912)
  - Asrate Kassa, Ethiopian commander (born 1922)
  - Endelkachew Makonnen, Ethiopian politician, Prime Minister of Ethiopia (born 1927)
- 1974 – Cornelius Ryan, Irish-American journalist and author (born 1920)
- 1976 – André Malraux, French theorist and author (born 1901)
- 1979 – Merle Oberon, Indian-born British actress (born 1911)
- 1979 – Judee Sill, American singer-songwriter and guitarist (born 1944)
- 1982 – Grady Nutt, American minister and author (born 1934)
- 1983 – Juhan Muks, Estonian painter (born 1899)
- 1983 – Waheed Murad, Pakistani actor, producer, and screenwriter (born 1938)
- 1984 – Leonard Baker, American historian and author (born 1931)
- 1990 – Roald Dahl, British novelist, poet, and screenwriter (born 1916)
- 1991 – Klaus Kinski, German-American actor and director (born 1926)
- 1992 – Roy Acuff, American singer-songwriter and fiddler (born 1903)
- 1992 – Jean-François Thiriart, Belgian politician (born 1922)
- 1994 – Art Barr, American wrestler (born 1966)
- 1994 – Irwin Kostal, American songwriter, screenwriter, and publisher (born 1911)
- 1995 – Louis Malle, French-American director, producer, and screenwriter (born 1932)
- 1995 – Junior Walker, American singer and saxophonist (born 1931)
- 1996 – Mohamed Amin, Kenyan photographer and journalist (born 1943)
- 1996 – Art Porter, Jr., American saxophonist and songwriter (born 1961)
- 1996 – Idries Shah, Indian author, thinker and teacher in the Sufi tradition.
- 1997 – Jorge Mas Canosa, Cuban-American businessman (born 1939)
- 2001 – Bo Belinsky, American baseball player (born 1936)
- 2001 – Mary Whitehouse, English educator and activist (born 1910)
- 2002 – Roberto Matta, Chilean-Italian painter and sculptor (born 1911)
- 2004 – Pete Franklin, American radio host (born 1928)
- 2005 – Constance Cummings, American-English actress (born 1910)
- 2005 – Frank Gatski, American football player and soldier (born 1919)
- 2006 – Jesús Blancornelas, Mexican journalist, co-founded Zeta Magazine (born 1936)
- 2006 – Nick Clarke, English journalist (born 1948)
- 2006 – Betty Comden, American actress, singer, and screenwriter (born 1917)
- 2006 – Alexander Litvinenko, Russian spy and defector (born 1962)
- 2006 – Philippe Noiret, French actor (born 1930)
- 2006 – Anita O'Day, American singer (born 1919)
- 2006 – Willie Pep, American boxer and referee (born 1922)
- 2007 – Joe Kennedy, American baseball player (born 1979)
- 2007 – Óscar Carmelo Sánchez, Bolivian footballer and manager (born 1971)
- 2007 – Robert Vesco, American-Cuban financier (born 1935)
- 2007 – Pat Walsh, New Zealand rugby union player (born 1936)
- 2009 – José Arraño Acevedo, Chilean journalist and historian (born 1921)
- 2010 – Nassos Daphnis, Greek-American painter and sculptor (born 1914)
- 2010 – Joyce Howard, English-American actress (born 1922)
- 2011 – Jim Rathmann, American race car driver (born 1928)
- 2012 – José Luis Borau, Spanish actor, director, producer, and screenwriter (born 1929)
- 2012 – Chuck Diering, American baseball player (born 1923)
- 2012 – Larry Hagman, American actor, director, and producer (born 1931)
- 2012 – Diana Isaac, English-New Zealand businesswoman and philanthropist (born 1921)
- 2013 – Connie Broden, Canadian ice hockey player (born 1932)
- 2013 – Costanzo Preve, Italian philosopher and theorist (born 1943)
- 2014 – Marion Barry, American lawyer and politician, 2nd Mayor of the District of Columbia (born 1936)
- 2014 – Dorothy Cheney, American tennis player (born 1916)
- 2014 – Murray Oliver, Canadian-American ice hockey player and coach (born 1937)
- 2014 – Pat Quinn, Canadian ice hockey player and coach (born 1943)
- 2015 – Jamiluddin Aali, Pakistani poet, playwright, and critic (born 1925)
- 2015 – Manmeet Bhullar, Canadian lawyer and politician (born 1980)
- 2015 – Douglass North, American economist and academic, Nobel Prize laureate (born 1920)
- 2016 – Rita Barberá Nolla, Spanish politician (born 1948)
- 2016 – Ralph Branca, American baseball player (born 1926)
- 2016 – Andrew Sachs, German-born British actor (born 1930)
- 2016 – Joe Esposito, road manager for Elvis Presley (born 1938)
- 2017 – Stela Popescu, Romanian actress (born 1935)
- 2020 – Tarun Gogoi, Indian Chief Minister of Assam (born 1934)
- 2024 – Rico Carty, Dominican baseball player (born 1939)
- 2024 – Fred R. Harris, American politician (born 1930)
- 2024 – Chuck Woolery, American game show host and television personality (born 1941)

== Holidays and observances ==
- Christian feast day:
  - Alexander Nevsky (Repose, Russian Orthodox Church)
  - Amphilochius of Iconium
  - Columbanus
  - Felicitas of Rome
  - Blessed Margaret of Savoy
  - Blessed Miguel Agustín Pro – one of Saints of the Cristero War (Roman Catholic Church and the Lutheran Church)
  - Paulinus of Wales
  - Pope Clement I (Roman Catholic Church, the Anglican Communion, and the Lutheran Church)
  - Trudo (or Trond)
  - Wilfetrudis (or Vulfetrude)
  - November 23 (Eastern Orthodox liturgics)
- Labor Thanksgiving Day (Japan)
- Repudiation Day (Frederick County, Maryland, United States)
- St George's Day (Georgia) or Giorgoba (Georgia)
