= Timeline of the Derg =

This list details about chronological aspect of the Derg, the military junta that ruled Ethiopia from 1974 to 1987 by decade.

== 1970s ==
=== 1974 ===
- 12 January – Enlisted soldiers of the Ethiopian Army stationed at the Negele Borana periphery garrison staged a mutiny against the poor food and lack of water. They detained their own officers/NCO corps, and force-fed the envoy of the emperor sent to negotiate and pacify them.
- 10 February – Mutinies began to take place at the Debre Zeyt Ethiopian Air Force Base (in Bishoftu).
- 25 February – Mutinies occurred in the army's Second Division, headquartered in Asmara.
- February-March – Civilian protests and strikes for better conditions began to take place in some urban area schools and workplaces.
- 23 March – Prime Minister Endalkachew Mekonnen formed armed forces coordinated committee which its members did not support his government.
- 28 June – a group of military officers who didn't publicly reveal their identity or composition announced the creation of the Derg, officially the Coordinating Committee of the Armed Forces, who at this stage still professed loyalty to the monarchy, and made initially moderate demands that progressively became radical as the Ethiopian Revolution continued to unfold.
- July – the Derg obtained key concession of the Emperor Haile Selassie that can access the power to arrest the government officials in every level; both Aklilu Habte-Wold and Endalkachew Mekonnen along with their cabinets, regional governors, many senior military officers and officials were forced to resign and then imprisoned soon after.
- August – the Derg began dismantling the imperial government to forestall further development following a proposed constitution that offer constitutional monarchy.
- 12 September – the Derg deposed and imprisoned Emperor Haile Selassie
- 15 September – the committee renamed itself Provisional Military Administrative Council (PMAC) and took control of all governmental facilities.
- 23 November – The Ethiopian upheaval enters its violent stage: 60 former imperial government of Haile Selassie were summarily executed along with Gen. Aman Andom, who had been elected earlier to chair the military committee itself and had become the de facto/acting head of state when the emperor was removed.
- 28 November – the Derg elected Brigadier General Tafari Banti as a chairman of the Derg, while Mengistu Haile Mariam and Atnafu Abate were elected as vice-chairmen.

=== 1975 ===
- 18 February – the Tigray People's Liberation Front (TPLF) formed as the spearhead opposition group in Tigray province
- 4 March – the Derg announced a land reform with main slogan "Land for the Tiller".
- 21 March – Monarchy of the Ethiopian Empire was abolished.
- 27 August – Haile Selassie died from mysterious circumstances while his personal physician absented. It was believed that Mengistu killed him by order or in his own.

=== 1977 ===
- 3 February – Mengistu elected as the chairman of the Derg with undisputed leadership.
- 17 April – the first wave of Red Terror officially declared.
- 13 July – Ogaden War began with the invasion of Ethiopia by Somalia.

== 1980s ==
=== 1983 ===
- 1983–1985 famine in Ethiopia began in Ethiopia's four provinces: Hararghe, Gojjam, Wollo, and Tigray, resulting in 400,000 deaths.

=== 1985 ===
- July – the famine garnered international attention especially from Western community. The Oxfam and Live Aid concerted charity which ignited controversy whether NGOs in Ethiopia were under the control of Derg government or Oxfam and Live Aid coordinated to the Derg's enforced resettlement programmes, which displaced and killed between 50,000 and 100,000 people.

=== 1987 ===
- 22 February – the 1987 constitution adopted
- 12 September – the People's Democratic Republic of Ethiopia was established.

=== 1988 ===
- 8 May – The Tigrayan People's Liberation Front (TPLF) created new coalition named the Ethiopian People's Revolutionary Democratic Front (EPRDF)

=== 1989 ===
- The Ethiopian People's Democratic Movement (EPDM) joined the Ethiopian People's Revolutionary Democratic Front (EPDRF) to fight the Derg

== 1990s ==
- December – the Soviet Union ceased to aid the PDRE in line with its new policies related to the 1989 revolution in the Eastern bloc.

=== 1991 ===
- January – the Ethiopian Civil War intensifies, the EPRDF took over Gondar, Bahir Dar and Dessie while the Eritrean People's Liberation Front (EPLF) took all of Eritrea except Assab and Asmara in the south.
- March – the Afar Liberation Front (ALF) joined EPRDF
- April – the rebel forces crossed Shewa and Welega, on their way to Addis Ababa
- 21 May – President Mengistu managed to flee the country through Kenya border into Zimbabwe, where still lives today.
- 27 May – the rebel forces took control Jimma, Agaro and Gambela.
- 28 May – the rebel forces successfully seized Addis Ababa with nonviolence condition. Approximately 1,900 Derg officials detained thereafter.

=== 1992 ===
- The Special Prosecutor Office (SPO) was launched in order to investigate human rights violations committed during the Red Terror and the Derg regime as whole.

=== 1994 ===
- October – SPO submitted 73 Derg officials to Central Higher Court for the first time.
- 13 December – the first charge was filed.

== 2000s ==
=== 2006 ===
- 12 December – the Federal Supreme Court found guilty of 55 Derg officials, 22, including Mengistu, were charged in absentia.

=== 2007 ===
- 11 January – Detainees were sentenced to life imprisonment to 23 years rigorous punishment.

=== 2008 ===
- 26 May – the trial ended with most officials being sentenced to death.

== 2010s ==
=== 2011 ===
- 4 October – 16 Derg officials were released after serving 20 years incarceration.
