= Asfa-Wossen Asserate =

Ethiopian-German writer and consultant (born 1948)

Prince Asfa-Wossen Asserate
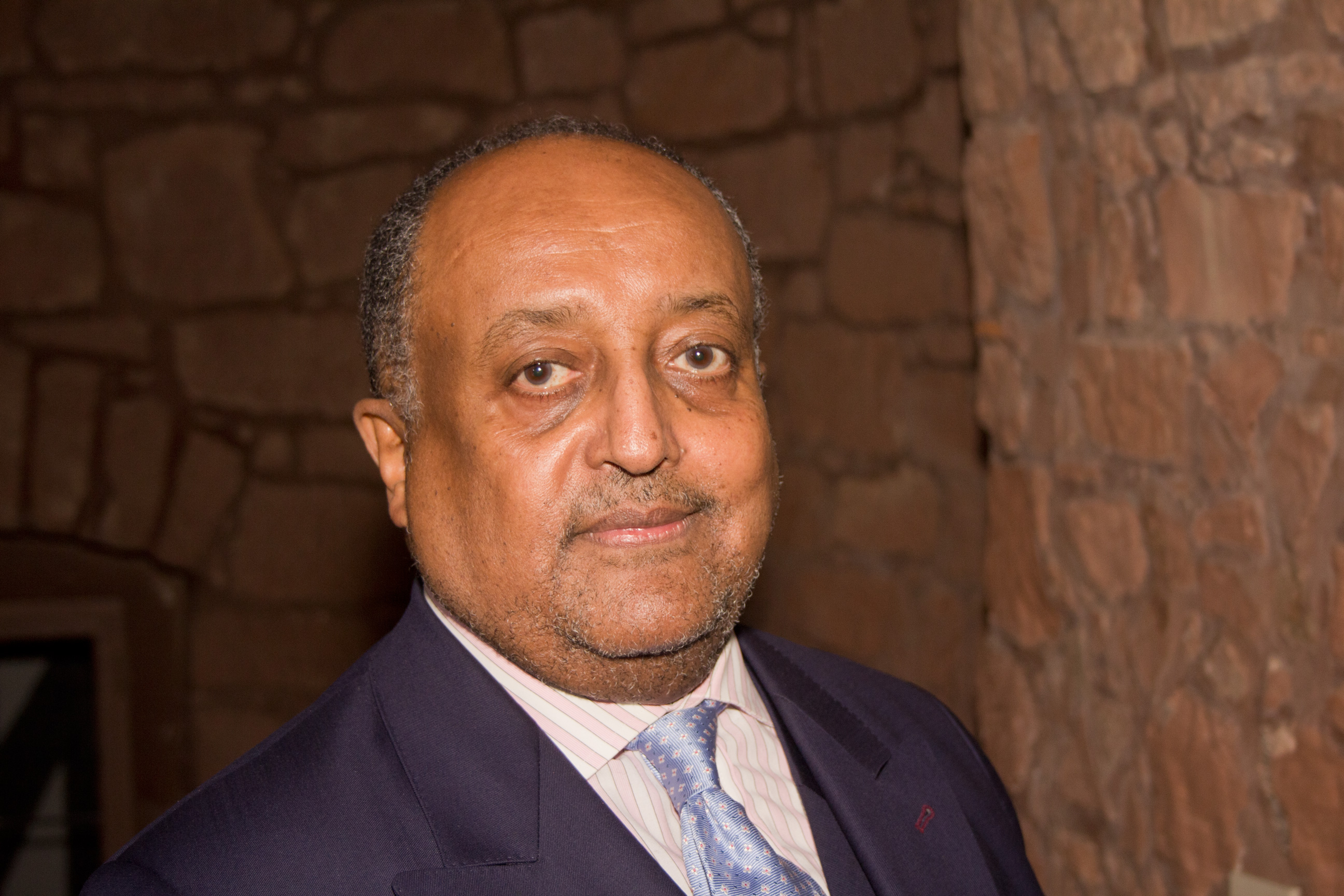
- Prince Asfa-Wossen Asserate in 2012.
- Born: 31 October 1948 (age 77); Addis Ababa, Ethiopian Empire
- House: House of Solomon (Shewan and Gondarine-Lasta branch)
- Father: Le'ul Ras Asserate Kassa
- Mother: Le'ult Zuriash Worq
- Religion: Orthodox Tewahedo Church

Styles of Asfa-Wossen Asserate
- Reference style: His Highness
- Spoken style: Your Highness
- Alternative style: Sir

Le'ul Ras Asfa-Wossen Asserate (Amharic: አስፋ ወሰን ዓሥራተ; born 31 October 1948) is an Ethiopian-German political analyst and consultant for African and Middle-Eastern Affairs and best-selling author. A member of the Ethiopian royalty, he is the great-nephew of the last Emperor of Ethiopia Haile Selassie I, great-grandson of the Empress Menen and son of the last President of the Imperial Crown Council, Le'ul Ras (Duke) Asserate Kassa and his wife Leult (Princess) Zuriash Worq Gabre-Iqziabher.

== Life ==
Le'ul (Prince) Asfa-Wossen Asserate was born in 1948 in Addis Ababa, where he attended the German school and received his "Abitur". He went on to study law, economics and history at the University of Tübingen and at Magdalene College, Cambridge. In 1978, he was awarded a Ph.D. with honours in Ethiopian history at the University of Frankfurt am Main.

In 1974, the Derg takeover in Ethiopia made it impossible for him to return to the land of his ancestors: His father and 60 other dignitaries of the Imperial Government were executed without a trial and all the members of the Imperial Family were held in kith and kin detention for more than a decade by the Derg.

While in West Germany Asfa-Wossen Asserate founded the human rights group for Ethiopia called the Council for Civil Liberties in Ethiopia (CCLE) and campaigned for the release of all political prisoners and his detained family until the demise of the Mengistu dictatorship. After leaving university Asserate worked as the Press Officer for the Frankfurter Messegesellschaft (1978–1980), and as the Director of the Press and Information Department of the Düsseldorf Trade Fair and as a freelance journalist (1980–1983). In 1981 he became a German citizen.

Since 1983 he has been working as a Consultant for African and Middle Eastern Affairs, advising middle-sized German companies in respect to their export promotion to these countries.

As a political analyst he has written a considerable number of articles and essays in German daily newspapers and learned publications. In 1994 he founded Orbis Aethiopicus, the Society for the Preservation and Promotion of Ethiopian Culture, which holds scientific congresses with a focus on Ethiopian culture, history and archeology and places great endeavour to pass on Ethiopia's ancient cultural heritage to the new generation.

His published books include the etiquette bestseller Manieren ("Manners", 2003), a 2015 biography entitled King of Kings: The Triumph and Tragedy of Emperor Haile Selassie I of Ethiopia, and most recently African Exodus: Migration and the Future of Europe (2018).

== Literary work ==
- Die Deutsche Schule in Addis Abeba – aus äthiopischer Sicht. In: Zeitschrift für Kulturaustausch, Ethiopia special edition 1973 release, E 7225 F.S., pp. 162–175.
- Manieren. Frankfurt am Main: Eichborn, 2003, 388 pages, ISBN 3-8218-4739-5
- as editor, with Aram Mattioli: Der erste faschistische Vernichtungskrieg. Die italienische Aggression gegen Äthiopien 1935–1941. Köln: SH-Verlag, 2006; ISBN 978-3-89498-162-4 (Italien in der Moderne 13)
- as editor: Adolph Freiherr Knigge: Benjamin Noldmanns Geschichte der Aufklärung in Abessynien. Frankfurt am Main: Eichborn, 2006; ISBN 3-8218-4569-4.
- Ein Prinz aus dem Hause David und warum er in Deutschland blieb ("A prince of the house of David and why he remained in Germany"). Frankfurt am Main: Scherz, 2007; ISBN 978-3-502-15063-3
- Draußen nur Kännchen. Meine deutschen Fundstücke. Frankfurt am Main: Scherz, 2010; ISBN 978-3-502-15157-9
- Afrika. Die 101 wichtigsten Fragen und Antworten. Munich: C. H. Beck, 2010; ISBN 978-3-406-60096-8
- Integration oder die Kunst, mit der Gabel zu essen. Munich: Utz, 2011; ISBN 978-3-8316-4044-7
- Contributions to the English Encyclopaedia Aethiopica; ISBN 3-447-04746-1
- Der letzte Kaiser von Afrika – Triumph und Tragödie des Haile Selassie. Berlin: Propyläen, 2014; ISBN 978-3549074282
- King of Kings: The Triumph and Tragedy of Emperor Haile Selassie I of Ethiopia, Haus Publishing, 2015. Foreword by Thomas Pakenham. ISBN 978-1910376140
- African Exodus: Migration and the Future of Europe, Haus Publishing, 2018. Introduction by David Goodhart. ISBN 978-1910376904

== Awards & Honours ==
- 2004: Adelbert von Chamisso Prize (for Manieren)
- 2008: Honorary Senator of the Eberhard Karls University of Tübingen
- 2011: Walter Scheel Prize of the Federal Ministry for Economic Cooperation and Development
- 2011: Listros Award
- 2015: Jacob Grimm Award
- 2019: - 1348th Knight of the Order of the Austrian Golden Fleece

== Honorary offices ==
- Member of the Innovation Council of the Federal Ministry for Economic Cooperation and Development.
- Member of the Alumni Council of the Johann Wolfgang Goethe University.
- Founder and Chairman of the Board of Patrons of ORBIS AETHIOPICUS, the society for the preservation and promotion of Ethiopian Culture (since 1994).
- Chairman of the Board of the Society for Museums in Ethiopia.
- Chairman of the Advisory Board of the German-Ethiopian Students and Graduate Association (DÄSAV e.V.).
- Patron of Project E (Ethiopia, Education, English).
- Patron of the Ethiopian National Arts Council (ENAC).
- President of the Council for Civil Liberties in Ethiopia (CCLE).
- Patron of TheMoveForwardProject.
- Royal Protector of the Ordo Militiae Christi Templi Hierosolymitani (2008).
