= Alem Bekagn =

Defunct central prison in Ethiopia

- Interactive map of Alem Bekagn
- Location: Addis Ababa, Ethiopia; 9.0000°N 38.7445°E
- Status: Demolished
- Security class: Maximum
- Opened: c. 1923
- Closed: 2004
- Former name: Kerchele Prison; Central Prison
- Website: http://www.alembekagn.org

Notable prisoners
- The Sixty

Alem Bekagn (Note: Other transliterations include Alem Bekagne and Alem Beqañ.) (Amharic: ዓለም በቃኝ, "Farewell to the World"), or 'Kerchele Prison', was a central prison in Ethiopia until 2004. Located in Addis Ababa, the prison possibly existed as early as 1923, under the reign of Empress Zewditu, but became notorious after Second Italo-Ethiopian War as the site where Ethiopian intellectuals were detained and killed by Italian Fascists in the Yekatit 12 massacre. After the restoration of Emperor Haile Selassie, the prison remained in use to house Eritrean nationalists and those involved in the Woyane rebellion. Under the Communist Derg regime that followed, the prison was the site of another mass killing, the Massacre of the Sixty, and of the torture and execution of rival groups in the Red Terror. The prison remained a site of human rights abuses until the Ethiopian People’s Revolutionary Democratic Front entered Addis Ababa on 28 May 1991, after which it became a normal prison. The prison was closed in 2004 and demolished in 2007 to allow the construction of the headquarters of the African Union.

== Design ==
Alem Bekagn was constructed along panopticon principles, with 57 cells – each designed for 10 to 20 prisoners – arranged in two tiers around an octagonal courtyard. As the prison population swelled into the thousands, additional huts were constructed around the outside. The site also included a church and a visitation area in the form of two fences placed 4 feet (1.2 m) apart. The prison held both men and women, with the two divided by corrugated iron sheeting.

The prison was sometimes known as Akaki Prison, (Note: Under the Fascist occupation, Addis Ababa had a second prison also known as Akaki, which was a concentration camp on the city's outskirts.) as it sat on the banks of a tributary of the Akaki River, or Kerchele Prison, a phonetic rendering of the Italian term for prison, carcere. Its widely used title of Alem Bekagn, variously translated as "farewell to the world", "end of the world" or "I have given up on the world", likely came about as a result of its courtyard structure, which blocked out everything but the sky.

== History ==
=== Early history and Italian occupation ===
The construction date of the prison is not known, but it likely began under the Empress Zewditu in 1923 or 1924. Addis Ababa fell to the Italians on 5 May 1936, and the prison was quickly taken over by the Fascist regime to house political prisoners.

On 19 February 1937 (Yekatit 12 in the Ethiopian calendar), two Eritreans attempted to assassinate the Viceroy of Italian East Africa, Rodolfo Graziani. Graziani's revenge was swift, and over one thousand people were incarcerated at Alem Bekagn, with many tortured and killed by crushing with ropes. Rodolfo Graziani referred to Akaki Prison as a concentration camps in some telegrams to Rome. Alem Bekagn was also used as a transit for detainees coming from Debre Birhan Prison before being deported to Danane Concentration Camp. The camp/prison remained in use throughout the Italian occupation, and still contained prisoners when Allied troops liberated Addis Ababa on 6 April 1941.

=== Restoration of the Ethiopian Empire ===
The liberation of Addis Ababa saw Emperor Haile Selassie returned to the country. Almost immediately, Selassie faced an uprising in the Tigray Province. The leaders of this revolution, the Woyane, were imprisoned at Alem Bekagn, and following the annexation of Eritrea they were joined by Eritrean nationalists.

When the Organisation of African Unity was founded in 1963, its headquarters were located next door to Alem Bekagn. The inner courtyard was visible from the windows of the OAU headquarters, but due to the OAU's policy of non-interventionism, the organisation never condemned the torture and killings at the prison and it would return escapees who claimed refuge in the building. The killings included the execution of 60 ministers under the Derg regime, who were lined up against a wall in full view of the OAU building.

=== The Derg regime ===
With so many political prisoners enclosed together, Alem Bekagn radicalised Ethiopian revolutionaries. Following a revolution in February 1974, a Marxist-Leninist military dictatorship known as the Derg rose to power. The Derg arrested the royal family and the imperial government and held them at Alem Bekagn. Many of these were killed in the Massacre of the Sixty on 23 November 1974, including the Prime Ministers Aklilu Habte-Wold and Endalkachew Makonnen and the Ras (Prince) Asrate Kassa.

Mengistu Haile Mariam took control of the Derg in 1977, and cemented his position with a campaign of imprisonment and execution known as Qey Shibir or the Ethiopian Red Terror. Many of those arrested in these purges were held at Alem Bekagn, and as many as 10,000 were killed on the site, while overcrowding and unsanitary conditions led to the deaths of more through typhus.

=== Final years and demolition ===
The Ethiopian Civil War, which had been running since the rise of the Derg, came to a head with the entry of the Ethiopian People’s Revolutionary Democratic Front into Addis Ababa on 28 May 1991. The prison guards fled, and the captives – at that point, mostly Eritrean prisoners of war – freed themselves. The bodies of the Sixty were exhumed from the prison grounds and reburied outside Holy Trinity Cathedral.

The prison was closed in 2004, and on the 10th anniversary of the Rwandan genocide that year, plans were presented to the African Union to convert the site into a memorial to human rights abuses. These plans were supported by the Mayor of Addis Ababa Arkebe Oqubay. However, Oqubay was replaced as mayor by Berhane Deressa, who although himself a former prisoner was dedicated to removing traces of the former dictatorships, while the Chinese government offered the AU a gift of a new headquarters on the site. The memorial plans were rejected, and Alem Bekagn was demolished within one day in 2007. Nothing remains of the prison, but the new AU Conference Center and Office Complex has a small memorial to Alem Bekagn in its northern corner.

== See also ==
- Kaliti Prison, Ethiopia's central prison post-Derg, also the site of human rights abuses
