= Aman Andom =

Ethiopian general; chairman of the Derg in 1974

Lieutenant general Aman Andom
- አማን አንዶም
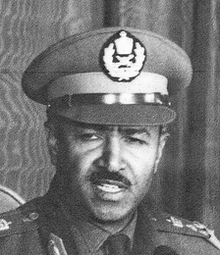
- Andom addressing a press conference following the 1974 coup

Chairman of the Derg de facto head of state of Ethiopia
- In office 15 September 1974 – 17 November 1974
- Monarch: Asfaw Wossen^{1}
- Preceded by: Haile Selassie (as Emperor)
- Succeeded by: Mengistu Haile Mariam

Spokesman of the Derg
- In office 15 September 1974 – 17 November 1974

Member of the Imperial Senate
- In office 1964–1974
- Appointed by: Haile Selassie

Personal details
- Born: 21 June 1924 Tsazega, Hamasien, Italian Eritrea
- Died: 23 November 1974 (aged 50) Addis Ababa, Ethiopia
- Cause of death: Assassination by gunshot
- Party: None (military regime)

Military service
- Allegiance: Ethiopian Empire (Ethiopia) Derg
- Branch/service: Ethiopian Army
- Years of service: 1949–1974
- Rank: Lieutenant general
- Battles/wars: Korean War; Congo Crisis; 1964 Ethiopian–Somali Border War
- ^{1}Crown Prince Asfaw Wossen Tafari had been declared "King-designate" by the Derg but made no move to acknowledge the title, instead recognizing his father, Haile Selassie I, as remaining the de jure Emperor

Aman Mikael Andom (Amharic: አማን ሚካኤል አንዶም, romanized: āman mīka’ēl āndom; Tigrinya: ኣማን ሚካኤል ዓንዶም; 21 June 1924 – 23 November 1974) was an Ethiopian military officer and politician who was the first post-imperial head of state of Ethiopia. Aman was also the first Chairman of the Derg. He was appointed to this position following the coup d'état that ousted Emperor Haile Selassie on 12 September 1974, and served until his assassination in a shootout with his former supporters.

== Early life ==
Aman Mikael Andom was born in the village of Tsazega, Italian Eritrea. He had four other siblings. Aman was a Lutheran.

== Military career ==
Educated in Sudan, Aman returned to Ethiopia with the British forces who defeated the Italians and restored Emperor Haile Selassie to the throne. He proceeded to distinguish himself in a brilliant military career, commanding Ethiopian contingents in the Korean War and Congo Crisis. In 1962, he was promoted to major general. During the 1964 Ethiopian–Somali Border War he was given the nickname the "Desert Lion" after a significant battle with Somali forces in the Ogaden.

== Head of State ==
Aman's official title was Chairman of the Provisional Military Administrative Council (better known as Derg), and he held the position of Head of State in an acting capacity as the military regime had officially proclaimed Crown Prince Asfaw Wossen as "King-designate" (an act that would later be rescinded by the Derg, and which was never accepted by the Prince as legitimate).

There is some evidence that indicates he had contacts with the officers of the junta as early as February and March 1974, but by July he was appointed chief of staff to the military junta. On 15 September 1974, three days after the junta removed the Emperor Haile Selassie from his palace to imprisonment at the headquarters of the Fourth Division, this group appointed Aman their chairman and head of state of Ethiopia. At the same time, this group of soldiers assumed the name "Provisional Military Administrative Council" (Derg).

From the first day of his becoming chairman, the Ottaways note, "the general found himself at odds with a majority of the Derg's members over most major issues, including whether he was chairman of the ruling military body or simply its spokesman. Aman fought the majority of the Derg over three central issues: the size of Derg, which he felt was too large and unwieldy; the policy to be taken towards the Eritrean Liberation Front (ELF); and over the punishment of the numerous aristocrats and former government officials in Derg's custody. His refusal to sanction the execution of former high officials, including two former prime ministers and several royal family members and relatives, put his relations with the majority of Derg on an especially bitter footing.

As an Eritrean, General Aman found himself fiercely at odds with the majority of the Derg. He wanted to negotiate a peaceful settlement; his opponents hoped to crush the ELF by military force. Aman went as far as making two personal visits to Eritrea—the first 25 August to 6 September 1974, the second in November 1974—giving speeches stating that the end of the Imperial regime was also the end of old practices towards Eritrea, that a government dedicated to national unity and progress would restore peace and prosperity to Eritrea, and lastly that he would begin investigations concerning crimes that the army had perpetrated on Eritreans and punish the guilty. Andom was seen as an moderate nationalist.

However, at the same time the Derg had begun the task of eliminating opponents within the military. The three significant units were the Imperial Bodyguard, the Air Force and the Corps of Engineers; of the three, the most recalcitrant were the Engineers. So on 7 October 1974 soldiers loyal to the Derg stormed the engineers' camp, killing five, wounding several and detaining the rest. Bahru Zewde later observed, "With that [incident], the illusion that the revolution would remain bloodless was exploded."

General Aman responded with a personal campaign to seek support outside the Derg, among the rest of the army and the country where he was popular. On 15 November 1974, he sent a message to all military units that was highly critical of the Derg. During a general assembly of the Derg two days later, Mengistu Haile Mariam demanded that 5,000 men be dispatched to Eritrea and six imprisoned Imperial officials be executed; Aman refused, resigned his official posts and retired to his house where he secretly sent appeals to his supporters, especially those in the Third Division. But Mengistu managed to intercept these appeals.

== Assassination ==
On 23 November 1974, Aman died in a battle in his home with several troops sent there to arrest him. That same night, the political prisoners that the Derg had marked for execution were taken from Menelik prison, where they had been held, and shifted to the Akaki Central Prison to be executed instead and buried in a mass grave. "It appears that the general had outlived his usefulness," Bahru Zewde concludes, and was in fact becoming an obstacle to the Derg's exercise of power.

Political offices
Preceded by Haile Selassie as Emperor of Ethiopia	Head of state of Ethiopia; 1974	Succeeded by Tafari Benti
