= Massacre of the Sixty =

1974 execution in Addis Ababa, Ethiopia

- Part of the Ethiopian Civil War
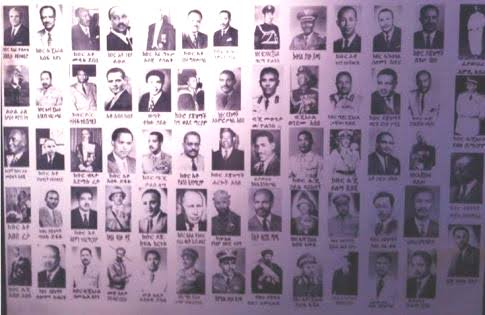
- Victims of the massacre in photo
- Native name: ጥቁር ቅዳሜ
- Date: 23 November 1974; 51 years ago
- Location: Kerchele Prison, Addis Ababa, Ethiopia
- Also known as: the Sixty; Black Saturday
- Type: Execution by firing squad
- Target: 60 officials of the imperial government of Haile Selassie
- Outcome: Executed

The Massacre of the Sixty, or Black Saturday (Amharic: ጥቁሩ ቅዳሜ, tikuru kidami), was an execution that took place in Addis Ababa, Ethiopia commissioned by the Derg government against 60 imprisoned former government officials at Kerchele Prison on the morning of 23 November 1974. The prison was commonly called Alem Bekagn – "I've had enough of this world".

The Ethiopian Revolution started about ten weeks before the massacre. Before this point, the Derg was able to instill hope among the people that the revolution could remain bloodless. Epitomised by the slogan "Ityopiya tikdem, yala mimin dem” – “Ethiopia first, without any bloodshed”. The massacre presaged the Red Terror and Ethiopian Civil War.

== List of people killed ==
The 54 below were killed on the orders of Mengistu Haile Mariam. Their names were read the following morning on Ethiopian Radio.

=== Killed ===
1. Prime Minister Tsehafi Taezaz Aklilu Habte-Wold
2. Prime Minister Lilj Endalkachew Makonnen
3. Lt. General Abiye Abebe
4. H.H. Prince (Leul Ras) Asrate Kassa
5. Rear Admiral Leul Iskinder Desta
6. Ras Mesfin Sileshi
7. Ato Abebe Retta
8. Ato Akalework Habte-Wold
9. Lt. Colonel Tamirat Yigezu
10. Dejazmatch Kifle Irgetu
11. Lt. General Kebede Gebre
12. Lt. General Issayas Gebre-Sellasie
13. Lt. General Assefa Ayana
14. Lt. General Debebe HaileMariam
15. Lt. General Belete Abebe
16. Lt. General Deresae Dubale
17. Lt. General Haile Baikedagn
18. Lt. General Assefa Demisse
19. Lt. General Abebe Gemeda
20. Lt. General Yilma Shibeshi
21. Ato Mulatu Debebe
22. Dr. Tesfaye Gebre Igzi
23. Dejazmatch Workineh Wolde Amanuel
24. Dejazmatch Aemero Selassie Abebe
25. Dejazmatch Solomon Abreha
26. Dejazmatch Sahelu Difeye
27. Dejazmatch Worku Enko Selassie
28. Dejazmatch Legese Bezu
29. Colonel Solomon Kedir
30. Blata Admasu Retta
31. Ato Nebiye Leul Kifle
32. Ato Solomon Gebre Mariam
33. Ato Tegegn Yetashework
34. Afe Negus (Lord Chief Justice) Abeje Debalke
35. Dejazmatch Kebede Aliwele Asfaw
36. Major General Gashaw Kebede
37. Major General Seyoum Gedle Giorgis
38. Major General Tafesse Lemma
39. Lij Hailu Desta
40. Fitawrari Amde Abera
41. Fitawrari Tadesse Enko Selassie
42. Fitawrari Demisse Alamirew
43. Kegnazmatch Yilma Aboye
44. Brigadier General Wondemu Abebe
45. Brigadier General Girma Yohannes
46. Brigadier General Mulugeta Wolde Yohannes
47. Colonel Yegazu Yemane
48. Colonel Alem Zewde Tessema
49. Colonel Tassew Mojo
50. Major Berhane Mecha
51. Captain Mola Wakene
52. Captain Wolde-Yohannes Zergaw
53. Lieutenant Belai Tsegaye

=== Killed in shootout ===
The remaining six were killed in a shootout at the home of General Aman Andom.

1. Lieutenant Demisse Shiferaw
2. Lance Corporal Bekele Wolde Giorgis
3. Sub-Corporal Tekle Haile
4. Lt. General Aman Mikael Andom
5. Lance Corporal Tesfaye Tekle
6. Junior Aircraftsman Yohannes Fetoui
