= Aserate Kassa =

Ethiopian noble (1922–1974)

- Leul; Ras
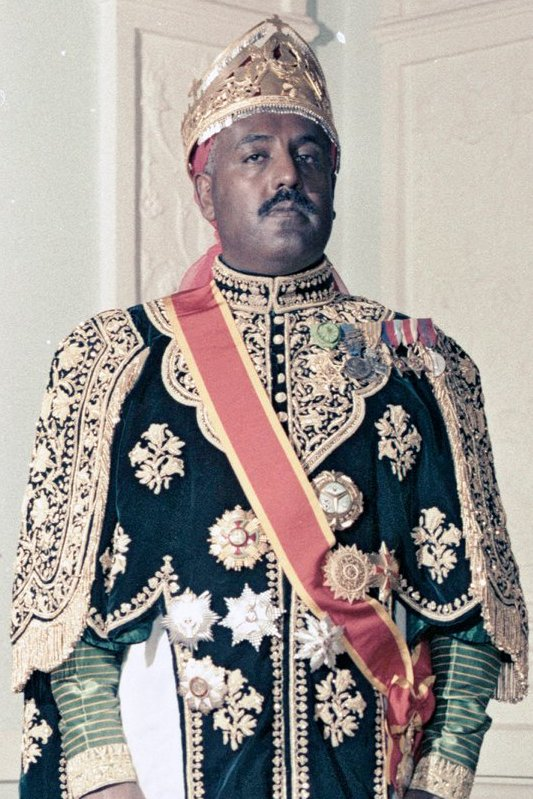
- Born: 30 April 1918
- Died: 23 November 1974 (aged 56); Akaki Prison, Addis Ababa, Ethiopia
- Spouse: Le'ult Zuriash Worq Gabre Igziabher
- Issue: Asfa-Wossen Asserate; Mulugeta Asrate
- Dynasty: Solomonic dynasty (Selale branch)
- Father: Kassa Haile Darge
- Mother: Tsige Mariam Beshah

President of the Crown Council
- In office 29 July 1971 – 12 September 1974
- Monarch: Haile Selassie I
- Succeeded by: office abolished

Viceroy of Eritrea
- In office 3 July 1964 – 4 December 1970
- Monarch: Haile Selassie I
- Prime Minister: Aklilu Habtewold
- Preceded by: Abiye Abebe
- Succeeded by: Debebe Hailemariam

Leul Ras Aserate Kassa GCVO (born Aserate-Medhin Kassa; 30 April 1918 – 23 November 1974) was a Viceroy of Eritrea and a member of the nobility of the Ethiopian Empire. He was the fourth son of Ras Kassa Haile Darge, and his wife Princess (Le'ult) Tsige Mariam Beshah. He was married to (Le'ilt) Zuriash Worq Gabre-Igziabher, daughter of Jantirar Gabre-Igziabher, and granddaughter of Empress Menen Asfaw, consort of Emperor Haile Selassie I. Prince Aserate Kassa was the head of the Selalle sub-branch of the Shewan branch of Ethiopia's Imperial Solomonic dynasty.

== Life ==
Born in 1918 to Kassa Haile Darge and Tsige Mariam Beshah, Aserate fled to Anglo-Egyptian Sudan after the Italian conquest of Ethiopia in 1936. Prince Aserate Kassa was educated at Monkton Combe School in the United Kingdom between 1937 and 1938. He served in the British Gideon Force during the Second World War and fought in the East African Campaign.

After the liberation of Ethiopia in 1941, Aserate held several positions including Governor of Arsi, and of Shewa. He was the president of Ethiopian Senate from 1961 to 1964. In 1964, he was appointed Viceroy of Eritrea. His chief rival was Prime Minister Aklilu Habte-Wold. The rivalry between the two prominent figures was caused by the suspicions between the conservative court faction made up largely but not exclusively of the nobility and church hierarchy, and led by Prince Aserate, and the faction of reformers led by the commoner technocrats led by the Prime Minister and officials largely of humble birth that owed their education and appointment to positions of power to the Emperor.

In 1966, Aserate Kassa was raised from Dejazmach to Ras. His elevation followed the death of his father Leul Ras Kassa, and his assumption of the headship of the Selalle line of the dynasty.

Ras Aserate struggled with the growing unrest in Eritrea. One part of his response was to create two armed groups under his direct control and funding: a commando force made primarily of Christian Eritreans and trained by the Israelis, and an Eritrean security force. The other part was to engage in discrete negotiations in hope of reconciling most of the populace based on appeals to shared highland Christian heritage. However, growing violence by the rebels enabled Aklilu Habte-Wold to undercut his authority and encourage the army to take harsher measures. By 1968 the rebels were fighting pitched battles against Ethiopian military forces. Israeli advisors failed to effectively control the tendency of Ethiopian commanders to use brutal tactics, which drove civilians to seek protection from the rebels. Only with difficulty did Ras Asrate dissuade Emperor Haile Selassie from listening to Aklilu and his generals and declare martial law in Eritrea in early 1970. Nevertheless, the Emperor authorized major military campaigns, which not only failed to defeat the insurgents but caused the death of the commanding general. Aklilu's faction was able to convince the Emperor to recall Ras Aserate, declare martial law in Eritrea, and appoint General Debebe Haile Mariam military governor.

Despite this loss of prestige, Haile Selassie selected Ras Aserate in July 1971 as President of the Crown Council, to rejuvenate that body and oversee an orderly transfer of power on Haile Selassie's death to his designated successor, Crown Prince Asfaw Wossen. When the Emperor was deposed and the Derg took power, Aserate Kassa was imprisoned and later executed along with 60 other imperial officials on 23 November 1974. His widow Princess Zuriashwork endured 14 years of harsh imprisonment before being released with the other women of the Imperial dynasty. His son Asfa-Wossen Asserate is a political analyst and consultant for African and Middle-Eastern Affairs in Germany.

== Honours ==
Ethiopian honours

- - Knight Grand Cross of the Order of the Holy Trinity
- - Knight Grand Cross of the Order of Menelik II
- - Knight Grand Cross of the Order of the Star of Ethiopia

Foreign honours

- - Knight Grand Cross of the Royal Victorian Order (GCVO)
- - Grand Cross, First Class of the Order of Merit of the Federal Republic of Germany
- - Knight Grand Cross of the Order of Orange-Nassau (24 January 1969).
- - Knight Grand Cross of the Order of Isabella the Catholic (27 April 1971).
