= Endelkachew Makonnen =

Prime Minister of Ethiopia in 1974

- እንዳልካቸው መኮንን
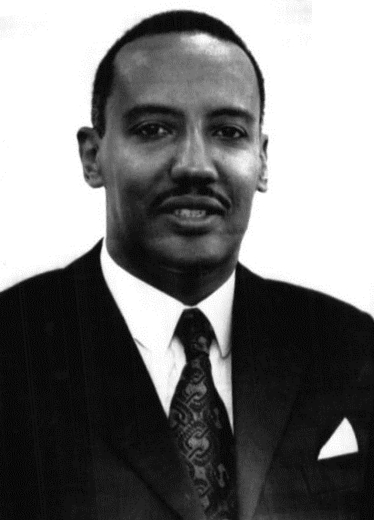

Prime Minister of Ethiopia
- In office 1 March 1974 – 22 July 1974
- Monarch: Haile Selassie I
- Preceded by: Aklilu Habte-Wold
- Succeeded by: Mikael Imru

Personal details
- Born: 27 September 1927 Addis Ababa, Ethiopian Empire
- Died: 23 November 1974 (aged 47) Addis Ababa, Ethiopia
- Party: Independent
- Education: Oxford University

Lij Endelkachew Makonnen (Amharic: እንዳልካቸው መኮንን; 27 September 1927 – 23 November 1974) was an Ethiopian politician. Born in Addis Ababa, his father, Ras Betwoded Makonnen Endelkachew, served as Prime Minister of Ethiopia in the 1950s. Endelkachew Makonnen was a member of the aristocratic Addisge clan that were very influential in the later part of the Ethiopian monarchy. He would be the last Imperial Prime Minister appointed by Emperor Haile Selassie. He was a stepson of Princess Yeshashework Yilma, Emperor Haile Selassie's only niece.

== Prime minister ==
The Oxford-educated Endelkachew served as Prime Minister from February 28 to July 22, 1974. During this period, the Imperial government was under assault by protesting students and striking workers who demanded investigation of corruption in the highest levels of government, reforms in land tenure, and political reforms as well. Endalkachew Makonnen attempted to address these demands by presenting reforms that began to change the very nature of the Ethiopian monarchy. The Emperor also agreed to some of these proposals, which included the drafting of a new constitution to replace the one adopted in 1955, and having the Prime Minister be responsible to the elected Lower House of Parliament rather than to the Emperor. "If this latter measure were to go into effect, it would result in a real diminution in the power and authority of the Crown", remarks Edmund J. Keller.

All of these actions were made to restore order and help reestablish the legitimacy of the regime in the eyes of the general population. However, as Keller notes, this would have been difficult even in the best of times. Although he had support amongst the older, well-connected members of the military, younger radical elements in the armed forces began to work against him from the moment he took office. Some believe this was Endelkachew's motivation for seeking alliances with moderate military officers with bases of support, such as Alem Zewde Tessema, the commander of the paratrooper battalion, and who became chair of the Armed Forces Coordinated Committee (AFCC) on 23 March. Two days later, Alem Zewde ordered the arrest of 30 radical airmen at the Ethiopian Air Force base at Debre Zeyit. On 30 April Endelkachew moved to placate his opponents on the left by authorizing the arrest of the former ministers—and his former colleagues—in the Aklilu government for corruption. Despite these efforts, radicalism grew unchecked both in civil society and in the military. Alem Zewde was tainted due to his support for Endelkachew and on 22 June lost control of his own battalion, and fled to Gojjam seeking refuge.

That same month, 12 or 16 members of the AFCC under the leadership of Colonel Atnafu Abate left that body and called for a meeting of representatives from all of the military units in Ethiopia at the headquarters of the Fourth Division, which was convened 28 June. This new committee became what was to be known as the Derg.

== Arrest ==
The critical event that doomed Endelkachew's administration occurred on 26 June 1974. On that day, a group of conservative members from the Chamber of Deputies petitioned the Emperor for the release of some of the officials that had been imprisoned for corruption. Numerous writers agree with Keller's judgement that this act "was seen as a clear indication that ruling politicians had no intention of bringing these individuals to justice". The new military committee acted swiftly, arresting 50 more alleged culprits from the ruling classes on 30 June. Within the next two weeks 150 more members of the former government, the current government, the provincial administration, the nobility, and the Imperial family (Iskinder Desta, the Emperor's grandson) were arrested.

Despite continued attempts to retain power, Prime Minister Endalkachew was arrested on 22 July 1974, and the Derg asked Lij Mikael Imru to assume the Prime Minister's office. Over the following months the Derg systematically dismantled the government and numerous public institutions. On 12 September, Emperor Haile Selassie was formally deposed by the Derg, an act Keller describes as "anticlimactic given the events that had unfolded since July". At last, on 23 November, Lij Endelkachew and 60 ex-officials of the former Emperor's government were taken from Menelik Palace and to Alem Bekagn prison where they were summarily executed.

== Previous posts ==
Lij Endelkachew had previously served in a variety of diplomatic and political posts. He was Ethiopian Ambassador to Britain, and later Permanent Representative to the United Nations, and was one of the people under consideration for the post of UN Secretary General in 1972, before Kurt Waldheim was appointed. He had also served as Minister for Posts and Communications, and had served as the International President of YMCA.
