= October 1974 =

Month of 1974

<<	October 1974					>>
Su	Mo	Tu	We	Th	Fr	Sa
		1	2	3	4	5
6	7	8	9	10	11	12
13	14	15	16	17	18	19
20	21	22	23	24	25	26
27	28	29	30	31

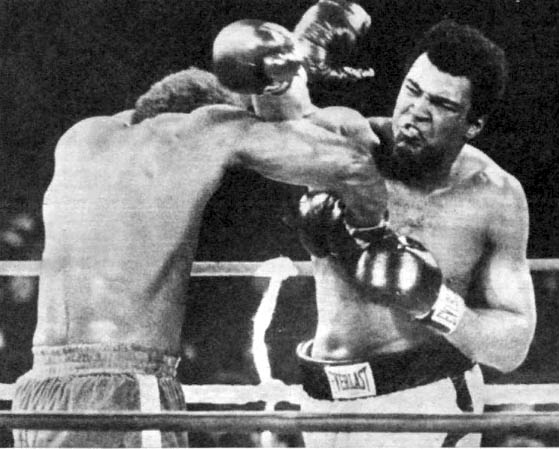
October 30, 1974: Muhammad Ali defeats George Foreman in "The Rumble in the Jungle" in Kinshasa, Zaire.

The following events occurred in October 1974:

== October 1, 1974 (Tuesday) ==
- Nigeria's president, Yakubu "Jack" Gowon, announced that the government pledge to return the West African nation to civilian rule by 1976 was being postponed indefinitely. Gowon would be overthrown seven months later.
- Houston reporter Anita Martini became the first female journalist admitted to the locker room of a major league sports team after the Los Angeles Dodgers had defeated the host Houston Astros, 8 to 5, to end the season in first place in the National League West. Martini followed male reporters to the locker room and announced that she wanted to interview Jimmy Wynn and was told, as she expected, that she would have to wait until Wynn got dressed and came out to see her. She asked the attendant to take a message to Wynn, who got the approval of Dodgers manager Walt Alston and allowed Ms. Martini to come in.
- The Hirshhorn Museum and Sculpture Garden was inaugurated in Washington, D.C., to display the art collection donated by Joseph Hirshhorn, who was present for the event. U.S. President Gerald Ford, whose wife, Betty Ford, was recovering from breast cancer surgery, was unable to attend.
- A chicken house fire in Pittsfield, Maine, killed 29,000 hens and caused over $50,000 in damage.
- Died:
  - Spyridon Marinatos, 72, Greek archaeologist, discoverer of the ruined city of Aktotiri, died of a skull fracture from an accidental fall at an excavation on the island of Santorini.
  - Clifford McIntire, 66, former member of the United States House of Representatives from Maine
  - Frederick Moosbrugger, 73, United States Navy vice admiral, World War II commander of destroyer squadrons

== October 2, 1974 (Wednesday) ==
- The Soviet Union detonated a 1.7-kiloton atomic bomb near the village of Udachny as part of a dam construction project. Plans for further atomic blasts were halted after the radioactivity from fallout proved to be much larger than expected.
- The Cleveland Indians became the first team in Major League Baseball history to name an African-American manager, with the announcement that they had hired Frank Robinson to guide the team in the 1975 season. The hiring came five days after Cleveland manager Ken Aspromonte's contract expired and was not renewed.
- Edwin Reinecke, the Lieutenant Governor of California, resigned the same day he received probation and a suspended 18-month jail sentence following his criminal conviction for perjury.
- United Artists released the crime drama film The Taking of Pelham One Two Three, starring Walter Matthau and directed by Joseph Sargent.
- Paramount Pictures released the crime drama film The Gambler, starring James Caan and directed by Karel Reisz.
- Born: Rachana Banerjee (born Jhumjhum Banerjee), Indian film actress; in Calcutta, West Bengal
- Died:
  - Nurul Amin, 81, the only Vice President of Pakistan, known for serving 13 days as Prime Minister in 1971 and eight days as acting president in 1972.
  - William Lipkind, 69, American anthropologist and children's author
  - Vasily Shukshin, 45, Soviet actor, writer, screenwriter and director from the Altai region, died of a heart attack while filming the war epic They Fought for Their Country.
  - Carl R. Woodward, 84, former president of the University of Rhode Island

== October 3, 1974 (Thursday) ==
- An 8.1 magnitude earthquake in Peru killed 78 people and injured 2,414 others. The epicenter was located 50 miles (80 km) west-southwest of Lima.
- Born:
  - Marianne Timmer, Dutch speed skater who won three Olympic gold medals and three world championships, primarily for the 1000m, between 1997 and 2006; in Sappemeer, Groningen
  - Woody Aragón (stage name for Emilio de Paz Aragón), Spanish magician and illusionist; in Madrid
  - Adel Ferdosipour, Iranian TV producer and journalist known for the Iranian programs Navad and Football 120; in Rafsanjan
- Died: Bessie Louise Pierce, 86, American historian, author of A History of Chicago

== October 4, 1974 (Friday) ==
- Deng Xiaoping, who had fallen into disfavor during the Cultural Revolution in China after serving as a high-ranking government official in the 1950s, was named as the Primary Vice Premier of the People's Republic of China by Premier Zhou Enlai, with the approval of Communist Party Chairman Mao Zedong, and would later become the paramount leader of the People's Republic.
- The conservative New Democracy (Néa Dimokratía) political party was founded in Greece by former Prime Minister Konstantinos Karamanlis after the end of rule by the nation's military junta.
- Died:
  - Anne Sexton, 45, American poet and writer, winner of the Pulitzer Prize for Poetry, committed suicide by carbon monoxide poisoning.
  - Robert Lee Moore, 91, American mathematician

== October 5, 1974 (Saturday) ==
- Dave Kunst became the first person verified to have traveled around the world on foot, arriving back at his home at Waseca, Minnesota, after having left there, with his brother John, on June 20, 1970. Kunst covered an estimated 14,450 kilometres (8,980 mi) in his journey. John had been shot to death by bandits in Afghanistan in 1972.
- The Provisional Irish Republican Army bombed two pubs frequented by British Army personnel in Guildford, Surrey in England, killing five people and injuring 54. All of the dead and most of the injured were inside The Horse and Groom at 8:30 in the evening when the first bomb detonated, left under a table by two terrorists posing as a man and woman on a date. The second bomb exploded at The Seven Stars, which had been evacuated after the first bombing, but was being searched by pub employees. Two more pubs were bombed in London on October 11, without fatalities.
- Born: Christian Core, Italian professional rock climber; in Savona
- Died:
  - Zalman Shazar (born Shneur Zalman Rubashov), 84, President of Israel from 1963 to 1973.
  - Miguel Enríquez, 30, Chilean physician, general secretary of the Revolutionary Left Movement, was killed by security forces during a 2-hour gun battle in a suburb of Santiago.
  - Robert G. Robinson, 78, United States Marine Corps first lieutenant, World War I Medal of Honor recipient
  - Ebe Stignani, 71, Italian mezzo-soprano opera singer
  - Virgil Miller, 87, American cinematographer on 157 films

== October 6, 1974 (Sunday) ==
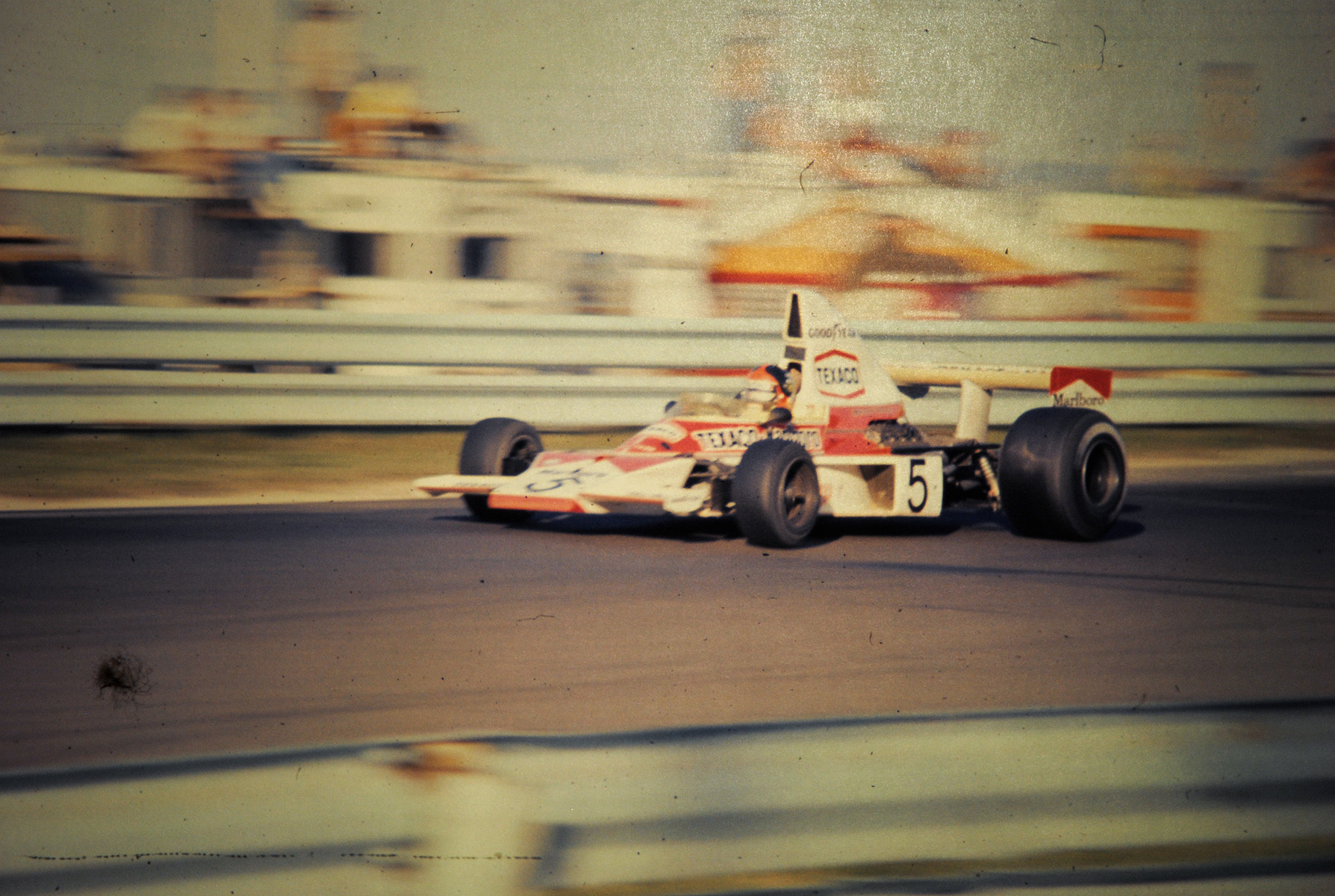
Emerson Fittipaldi during the 1974 United States Grand Prix

- Argentine Formula One racing driver Carlos Reutemann won the 1974 United States Grand Prix at the Watkins Glen Grand Prix Race Course in Watkins Glen, New York. Brazilian driver Emerson Fittipaldi secured the win of the 1974 World Championship of Drivers with his fourth-place finish. The race was marred by the death of 25-year-old Austrian driver Helmut Koinigg, who was decapitated after crashing on the 10th lap; his car broke through two catch fences and then went under a guard rail.
- A yes or no election was held in Albania for the 250 seats of the Kuvendi. Only one candidate was nominated in each constituency, and all 250 were members of the Democratic Front of Albania. The Albanian government announced that all 1,248,530 of the eligible voters had cast their ballots, and that 1,248,528 of the ballots were valid.
- David Pearson won the 1974 National 500 stock car race at Charlotte Motor Speedway in North Carolina.
- Born:
  - Hoàng Xuân Vinh, Vietnamese sports shooter and the first, and only, Vietnamese athlete to win an Olympic gold medal; in Sơn Tây, Hanoi. Xuan won gold for the Men's 10 meter air pistol competition at the 2016 Summer Olympics.
  - Jeremy Sisto, TV American actor best known for his roles as Cyrus Lupo in Law and Order, Billy Chenowith in Six Feet Under and Jubal Valentine in FBI; in Grass Valley, California.
- Died:
  - V. K. Krishna Menon, 78, India's Ambassador to the United Nations 1952 to 1962
  - Luther H. Hodges, 76, U.S. Secretary of Commerce from 1961 to 1965 and Governor of North Carolina from 1954 to 1961.
  - C.J. Latta CBE, 80, British film executive and managing director of the Associated British Picture Corporation
  - David Wallace, 66, American sociologist and marketing research specialist, died of a stroke.

== October 7, 1974 (Monday) ==
- King Bhumibol Adulyadej promulgated Thailand's ninth Constitution, but issued a memorandum objecting to its provision that the president of the Privy Council countersign the monarch's order appointing senators.

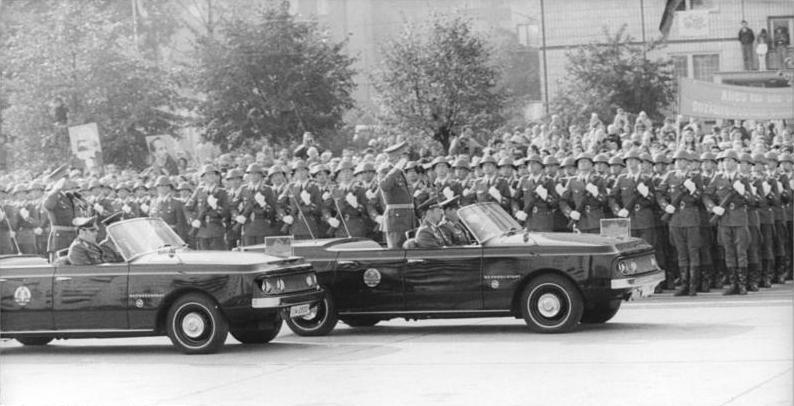
1974 East German Republic Day Parade

- Leonid Brezhnev, General Secretary of the Communist Party of the Soviet Union, attended the East German Republic Day Parade of 1974, a military parade on Karl-Marx-Allee in East Berlin, commemorating the 25th anniversary of the establishment of East Germany. The United States, Great Britain and France, which did not recognize the right of East Germany to have soldiers in East Berlin, condemned the parade.
- Wilbur Mills, Chairman of the Ways and Means Committee of the U.S. House of Representatives for almost 17 years, had his political career ended by a bizarre incident of public intoxication. Mills was drunk when police pulled over the car he was riding in, along with his extramarital mistress, Fanne Foxe. Although he won re-election as a Congressman from Arkansas, he compounded his reputation for drinking irresponsibly on November 30 as reporters followed him and would resign on December 1.
- Born:
  - Shannon MacMillan, American soccer football midfielder, 1996 Olympic gold medalist and 1999 World Cup champion with 177 caps for the U.S. national team; in Syosset, New York
  - Amit Agrawal, Indian inventor and mechanical engineer leading the development of diagnostic microdevices; in Allahabad, Uttar Pradesh
  - Franco Simon (stage name for Franco Simon Neelankavil), Indian composer and vocalist for Malayalam language films; in Thrissur, Kerala
  - Charlotte Perrelli, Swedish singer; in Hovmantorp
- Died:
  - Henry Cadbury, 90, American Bible scholar and Quaker who co-founded the American Friends Service Committee (AFSC), died of a cerebral hemorrhage following a fall down the stairs at his home. In 1947, Cadbury accepted the Nobel Peace Prize in Oslo when it was awarded to the AFSC and the British Friends Service Council.
  - Kenneth Leslie, 81, Canadian poet, songwriter and political activist

== October 8, 1974 (Tuesday) ==
- In the largest bank failure in U.S. history, Franklin National Bank on Long Island, adjacent to New York City, collapsed after becoming insolvent and having insufficient assets to pay the interest on a one-billion-dollar loan from the U.S. Federal Reserve Bank.
- The United Mexican States added Baja California Sur as its 30th state and Quintana Roo as its 31st state, after ratification by the Congress of Mexico and by a majority of the legislatures of the other states of Mexico. President Luis Echeverría Álvarez signed the decree to confer statehood on both former territories.
- U.S. President Gerald Ford launched his "Whip Inflation Now" (WIN) campaign in conjunction with a speech to Congress to reduce the federal deficit by reducing federal spending and raising the income tax for corporations and wealthy individuals by five percent. The "WIN" campaign was intended to encourage Americans to save money by reducing personal spending. The next day in major newspapers, a button that said "WIN" on it was offered to anyone who signed and mailed back a pledge that said, "Dear President Ford: I enlist as an inflation fighter and Energy Saver for the duration. I will do the very best I can for America."
- In La Paz, Bolivia, a bomb destroyed a statue of former U.S. President John F. Kennedy on the Avenue of the Americas. There were no injuries.
- Born:
  - Koji Murofushi, Japanese athlete in the hammer throw, 2004 Olympic gold medalist and 2011 World Champion; in Numazu, Shizuoka Prefecture
  - Zoran Zaev, Prime Minister of North Macedonia from 2020 to 2022; in Strumica, SR Macedonia, SFR Yugoslavia
- Died:
  - Harry Carney, 64, American jazz saxophonist
  - Paul G. Hoffman, 83, American businessman and statesman, administrator of the Marshall Plan and recipient of the Presidential Medal of Freedom

== October 9, 1974 (Wednesday) ==
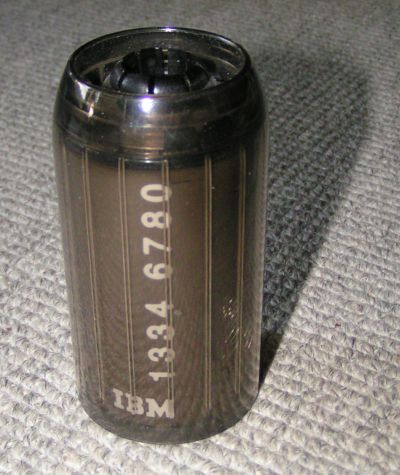
The palm-sized, 50MB 3850 cartridge

- The IBM 3850 computer accessory, the first to use compact cartridges for nearline storage, was introduced by the IBM company. The 3850 Mass Storage System could store a then-record 50 megabytes of memory on a small 4 inches (100 mm) long cartridge with a 70 inches (1,800 mm) long spool of magnetic tape, useful for holding infrequently used programming and data. Each cartridge could be loaded, when necessary, at a cost cheaper than maintaining data in a computer hard drive.

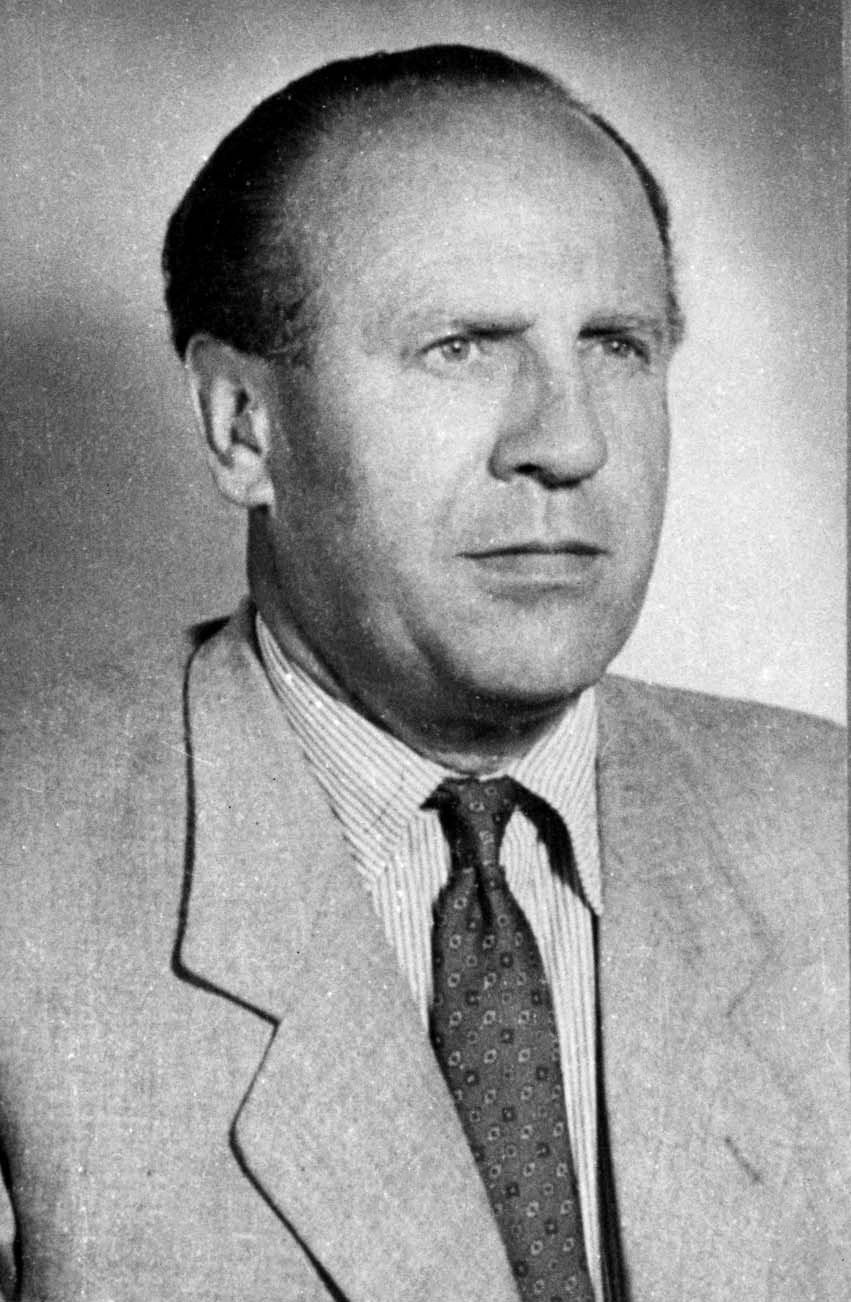
Schindler

- Died:
  - Oskar Schindler, 66, Sudeten German businessman and humanitarian, profiled in the 1993 film Schindler's List for saving 1,200 Jews from death in the Kraków-Płaszów concentration camp during the Holocaust
  - Theodore Foley, 61, American Roman Catholic priest and Superior General of the Congregation of the Passion of Jesus Christ, commonly called "The Passionists", died in Rome after contracting an illness on a trip to Asia.
  - Slim Williams (born Clyde Charles Williams), 93, American explorer and promoter of the Alaska Highway

== October 10, 1974 (Thursday) ==
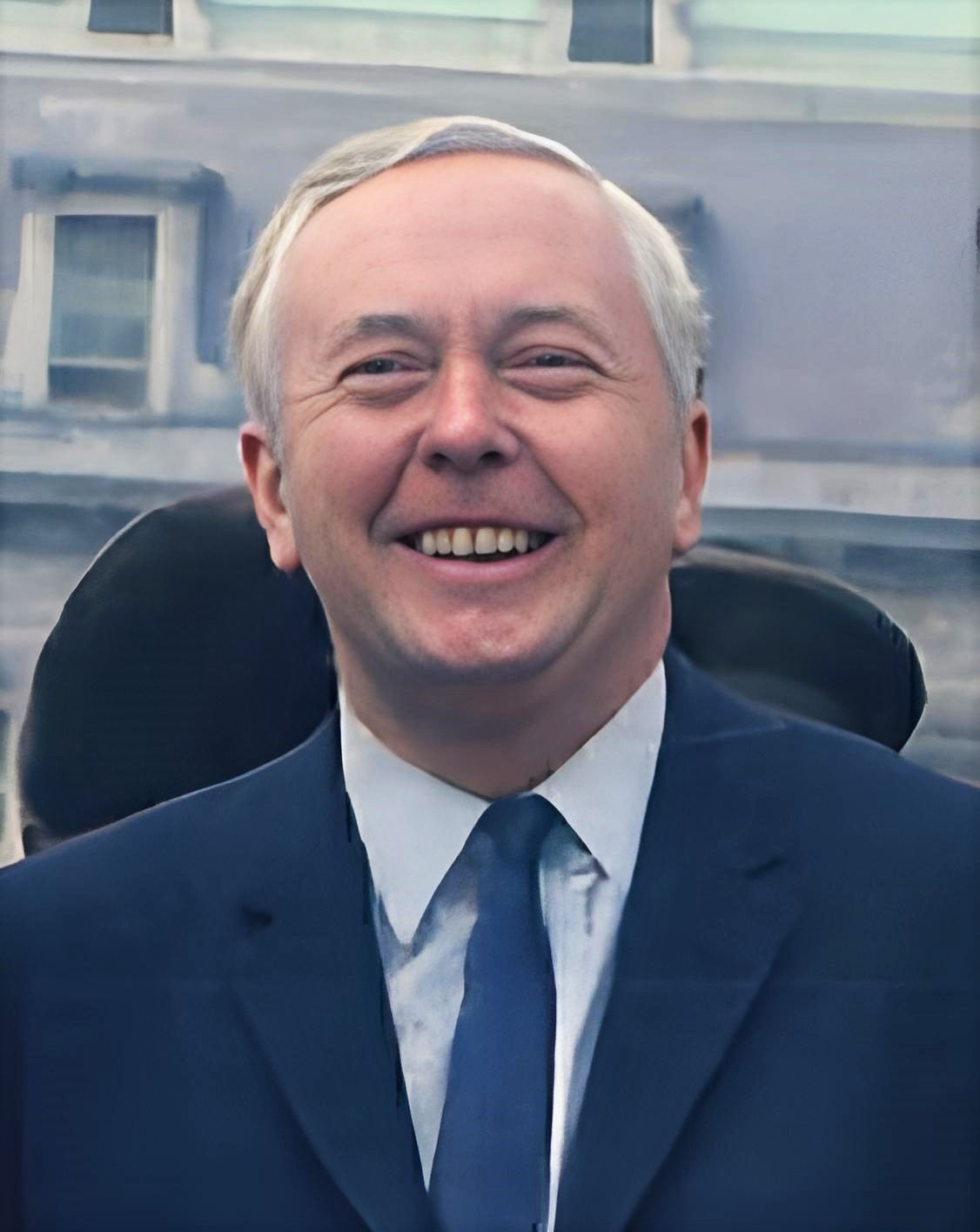
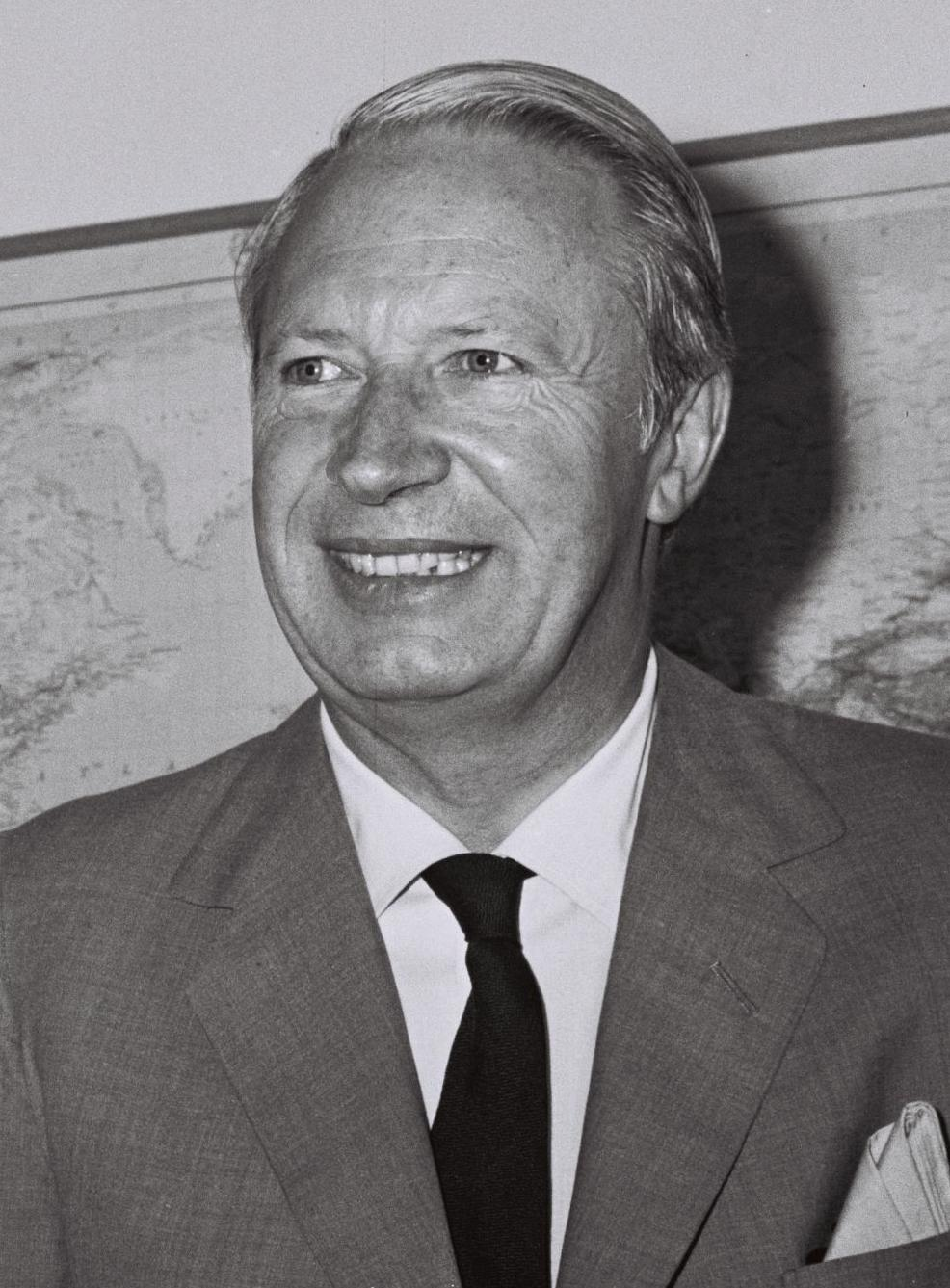
Harold Wilson (Labour) and Edward Heath (Tory)
- Elections were held for all 635 seats of the House of Commons of the United Kingdom. The Labour Party of Prime Minister Harold Wilson increased its share to a 319 to 277 majority over the Conservative Party of former Prime Minister Edward Heath, after having a 301 to 297 plurality. The conservative Tories lost 20 seats. The Liberal Party lost one of its 14 seats and finished in third place.
- Born:
  - Chris Pronger, Canadian National Hockey League defenceman inducted into the Hockey Hall of Fame, Hart Memorial Trophy as the NHL's Most Valuable Player for the 1999–2000 season; in Dryden, Ontario
  - Dale Earnhardt Jr. American race car driver; in Kannapolis, North Carolina
  - Oded Kattash, Israeli basketball player who was FIBA EuroBasket Top Scorer in 1997 and Israeli Basketball Premier League MVP in 1998, later Israeli League Coach of the Year in 2007; in Givatayim
- Died:
  - Tina Onassis Niarchos (born Athina Mary Livanos), 45, English-born Greek-French socialite and shipping heiress, wife of Stavros Niarchos, ex-wife of Aristotle Onassis and John Spencer-Churchill, 11th Duke of Marlborough, died of a pulmonary edema.
  - Lyudmila Pavlichenko, 58, Ukrainian World War II Red Army sniper with 309 confirmed kills, died of a stroke.
  - Alfred Irving Hallowell, 81, American anthropologist
  - Joseph Wulf, 61, German-Polish Jewish historian and survivor of the Auschwitz concentration camp, jumped to his death from the fifth-floor window of his apartment in Charlottenburg, West Berlin.

== October 11, 1974 (Friday) ==
- One of the first popular crime horror films, The Texas Chain Saw Massacre (as billed in the credits and in its copyright registration), more popularly written as The Texas Chainsaw Massacre, premiered in theaters. Produced and directed by Tobe Hooper, the low-budget ($140,000) movie, with a cast of unknowns (starring Marilyn Burns and Paul A. Partain), returned more than 200 times its investment, grossing $30,900,000 worldwide.

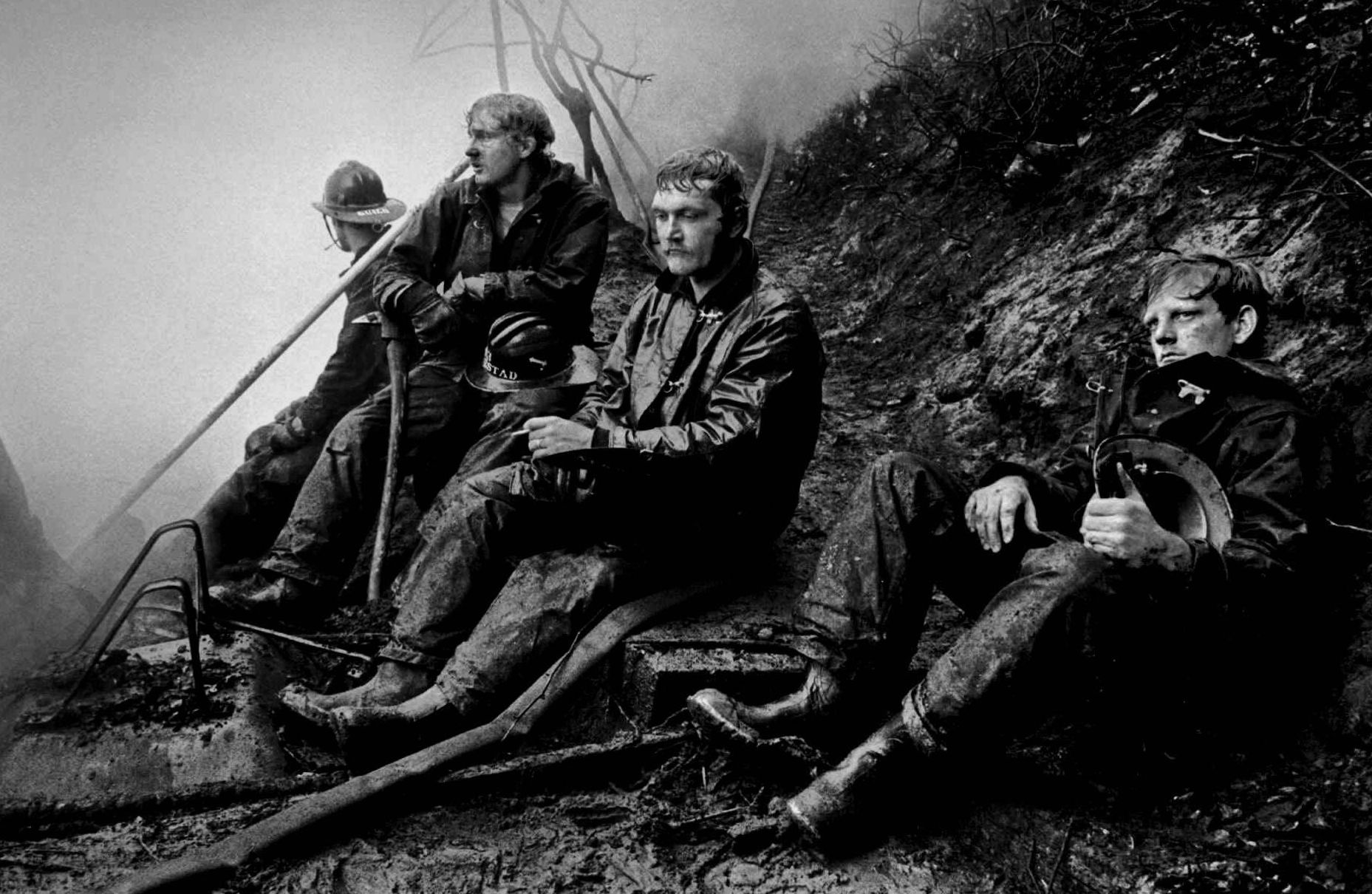
Lull in the Battle ((L to R Joe Guild, Tom Gudmestad, Chris Kitterman and Jim Flick)

- In Burien, Washington, Seattle Times photographer Jerry Gay took the Pulitzer Prize-winning photograph Lull in the Battle, depicting four firefighters resting after fighting an early-morning house fire.
- Born: Jason Arnott, Canadian National Hockey League centre who scored 417 career goals in 19 seasons; in Collingwood, Ontario
- Died:
  - Allan D. Cruickshank, 67, American ornithologist and writer, died of progressive kidney failure.
  - Steve Hamas, 67, American football player who became a professional boxer

== October 12, 1974 (Saturday) ==
- A U.S. Air Force Lockheed WC-130H weather reconnaissance airplane Swan 38, carrying a crew of six, disappeared after departing Clark Air Force Base in the Philippines. The crew had been sent to investigate Typhoon Bess and was over the South China Sea between Hong Kong and Taiwan when it went down.
- The 1974 Giro di Lombardia, the premier bicycling race of Italy, was won by Roger De Vlaeminck of Belgium, who finished the 266-kilometre (165 mi) race from Milan to Como in 7 hours, 7.54 seconds.
- The murder of Arlis Perry, a 19-year-old newlywed, took place in a church on the campus of Stanford University in California. While the campus security guard who discovered the body was a suspect, evidence confirming his involvement would not be discovered until 2018, more than 43 years after Perry's death. Stephen Blake Crawford would commit suicide before he could be arrested.
- Born: Shane McAnally, American country music singer-songwriter; in Mineral Wells, Texas
- Died:
  - Josef Krips, 72, Austrian conductor and violinist, died of lung cancer.
  - Wolfgang Stechow, 78, German-American art historian

== October 13, 1974 (Sunday) ==
- American singer Frank Sinatra performed 11 songs at a Madison Square Garden concert, televised (live or on tape delay) throughout the Western Hemisphere as Sinatra: The Main Event.
- Jane Chastain became the first woman on U.S. television to be a commentator on a nationally televised NFL game, appearing alongside play-by-play announcer Don Criqui and commentator Irv Cross on the CBS telecast of the New Orleans Saints playing against the Denver Broncos, to a mostly negative reception from the public.
- The first Berlin Marathon was held, with 274 runners moving along a "mostly forested route through the city's Grunewald forest."
- Born: Marius Skinderis, Lithuanian footballer and player on the Lithuania national team between 1997 and 2002; in Panevėžys, Lithuanian SSR, Soviet Union
- Died:
  - Ed Sullivan, 73, U.S. newspaper columnist and TV host known for the variety series The Toast of the Town (later renamed The Ed Sullivan Show), died of esophageal cancer at the age of 73.
  - Sam Rice (born Edgar Charles Rice), 84, American baseball pitcher and outfielder (Washington Senators), enshrinee of the Baseball Hall of Fame, died of cancer.
  - Wojciech Rubinowicz (aka Adalbert Rubinowicz), 85, Polish theoretical physicist known for the Maggie-Rubinowicz representation for which scalar and electromagnetic fields are interpreted as a transformation of a surface integral into a line integral
  - Otto Binder, 63, American science fiction, non-fiction and comic book writer, co-creator of Supergirl, died of a heart attack.
  - P. Schuyler Miller, 62, American science fiction writer and critic
  - Anatoli Kozhemyakin, 21, Soviet Russian footballer who had played for the Soviet national team, was killed in an elevator accident.
  - Marcel André, 89, prolific French film actor known for playing Belle's father in La Belle et la Bête
  - Reuven Rubin, 81, Romanian-born Israeli painter and diplomat

== October 14, 1974 (Monday) ==
- The Palestine Liberation Organization (PLO) was recognized by the United Nations General Assembly as the representative of the Palestinian people, and granted the right to participate in the deliberations of the General Assembly on the question of Palestine in plenary meetings.
- Elections were held in Kenya for 158 of the 170 seats of the National Assembly. Although the African nation's only legal political party was the Kenya African National Union (KANU), 740 candidates were on the ballot for the 158 positions and 88 incumbents, including four government ministers, were not re-elected. President Jomo Kenyatta appointed his choices for the other 12 seats.
- In Tokyo, an explosion on the third floor of Mitsui & Co.'s head office injured 16 people, including five police officers.
- The death of the first of two British commercial divers in the North Sea occurred as John K. J. Clark vomited and drowned after sustaining broken ribs while conducting a nighttime surface dive to monitor another diver off the semi-submersible platform drill rig Waage One in the North Sea. The next day, Gary Shields was asphyxiated after his oxygen umbilical was tangled during a bell dive on the Ekofisk pipeline in the Norwegian Sector.
- Born:
  - Natalie Maines, American singer, lead vocalist for The Dixie Chicks (now "The Chicks"); in Lubbock, Texas
  - Shaggy 2 Dope (stage name for Joseph Utsler), American rapper for the duo Insane Clown Posse, and professional wrestler; in Wayne, Michigan
- Died: John Sharpe Griffith, DFC*, 75, American World War I flying ace, World War II aviator and United States Air Force colonel

== October 15, 1974 (Tuesday) ==
- Much of the Long Kesh Detention Centre in Northern Ireland was destroyed by prisoners incarcerated for activities in the Provisional Irish Republican Army, as 21 of the compounds in Long Kesh were set on fire.
- The Ariel 5 space telescope, a joint project of the British space program with Italy, Kenya and the U.S., was launched into orbit from the Broglio Space Center's platform off the coast of Kenya in the Indian Ocean.
- The eruption of the Volcán de Fuego in Guatemala destroyed most of the town of Yepocapa. A sudden eruption on June 3, 2018, would kill 159 people and leave 256 others missing.
- The World Federation of Associations of Pediatric Surgeons was founded at a convention of pediatric surgeons in São Paulo.
- The six-member U.S. Federal Election Commission (FEC) was created as U.S. President Ford signed into law an amendment to the Federal Election Campaign Act of 1971.
- In a protest in Curtiss, Wisconsin, against rising feed costs and lower prices for farm products, members of the National Farmers Organization (NFO) slaughtered 658 calves and 15 pigs and dumped their bodies in a trench. Criticism of the waste from the protest was such that even U.S. President Ford called it "shocking and senseless."
- Died:
  - Maury John, 54, American college basketball coach at Drake University and Iowa State University, died of esophageal cancer.
  - László Detre, 68, Hungarian astronomer known for his research on variable stars
  - Glenn Lowell Jepsen, 71, American paleontologist at Princeton University, died of cancer.
  - Elizabeth du Gué Trapier, 81, American art historian

== October 16, 1974 (Wednesday) ==
- Two thousand people attended the funeral of television host Ed Sullivan at St. Patrick's Cathedral in Manhattan, at which Terence Cooke, the Archbishop of New York, officiated. Among those present were Abraham Beame (the Mayor of New York City), Louis J. Lefkowitz (the Attorney General of New York), Ray Bloch, Van Cliburn, Walter Cronkite, Toots Shor and Risë Stevens.
- The Philadelphia Bell of the World Football League, known for having claimed that almost 65,000 paid customers attended one of its home games in July, attracted a crowd of only 750 customers to the 102,000-seat JFK Stadium. A torrential downpour and a record of 6 wins and 9 losses were the primary factors.
- Born:
  - Aurela Gaçe, Albanian singer; in Llakatund, Vlorë County
  - Mark Holland, Canadian politician; in Pickering, Ontario
  - Paul Kariya, Canadian National Hockey League and Olympic champion left winger; in North Vancouver, British Columbia
- Died:
  - Vlasta Děkanová, 65, Czechoslovak Olympic artistic gymnast
  - Chembai (stage name for Chembai Vaidyanatha Bhagavatar), 78, Indian Carnatic music singer

== October 17, 1974 (Thursday) ==
- The Oakland A's won the 1974 World Series, four games to one, over the Los Angeles Dodgers, defeating the Dodgers 3 to 2 in Game 5.
- U.S. President Gerald Ford became the first incumbent president since Woodrow Wilson (and, as of 2024, the last) to testify in a Congressional hearing as he made a personal appearance before a subcommittee of the House Judiciary Committee to answer questions about his reasons for pardoning former President Richard M. Nixon. Ford testified that the pardon had not been prearranged, and that he made the decision because of his concern over reports of Nixon's deteriorating mental and physical health.
- An early morning fire killed 16 people and injured 30 at the New Nam San Hotel in Seoul in South Korea. Some of the guests, unable to escape, jumped to their deaths from the fourth and fifth floors of the hotel.
- In Stratford, Connecticut, the first flight of the Sikorsky UH-60 Black Hawk helicopter was made by test pilots James R. Wright and John Dixson.
- The first private manufacturer of space rockets, OTRAG (Orbital Transport-und Raketen-Aktiengesellschaft), was founded in Neu-Isenburg in West Germany, near Frankfurt, by aerospace engineer Lutz Kayser. The company would make one successful launch of a launch vehicle on May 20, 1978, from facilities in the African nation of Zaire (now the Democratic Republic of the Congo). International opposition to the first manufacturing, since World War II, of German rockets and missiles led to the West German government closing down OTRAG facilities, after which OTRAG would move its operations to Libya and finally close entirely in 1987.
- Born: Matthew Macfadyen, English actor; in Great Yarmouth, Norfolk
- Died: Johannes Krahn, 66, German architect

== October 18, 1974 (Friday) ==
- Roti Kapada Aur Makaan ("Food, Clothes and Shelter"), the highest-grossing Indian film of the year, was released across the nation. It would gross 52,500,000 Indian rupees and would win a Filmfare Award for its director, Manoj Kumar.
- Dr. James C. Fletcher, the Administrator of NASA, announced that the first orbital flights of the Space Shuttle, then planned for 1979, would end with landings at Edwards Air Force Base in California rather than at Kennedy Space Center in Florida.
- Mary Woodson, a 29-year-old ex-girlfriend of American singer Al Green, dumped a pan of scalding grits on him as he was getting out of the bathtub at his home near Memphis, Tennessee, leaving him with second-degree burns, and then shot herself to death.
- Born: Zhou Xun, Chinese actress and singer; in Quzhou, Zhejiang
- Died: Anders Lange, 70, Norwegian politician, died of heart failure.

== October 19, 1974 (Saturday) ==
Niue

- The tiny South Pacific island of Niue attained self-government as an "associated state" within the Realm of New Zealand (which was 1,500 miles (2,400 km) away), after voters approved the arrangement in a referendum on September 3.
- Japanese-born North Korean sympathizer Mun Se-gwang was sentenced to death for the murder of Yuk Young-soo, the First Lady of South Korea, during the attempted assassination of her husband, President Park Chung Hee, on August 15.
- Ronald F. Piskorski and Gary B. Schrager, members of a motorcycle gang, murdered four men and two women during a $300 robbery at the Donna Lee Bakery in New Britain, Connecticut.
- Died:
  - Nick Licata (born Nicolò Licata), 77, Italian American mobster, boss of the Los Angeles crime family
  - Frank L. Stanley Sr., 69, American civil rights activist and newspaper publisher (Louisville Defender), died of a heart attack.
  - William Tabbert, 53, American stage actor and singer known for the Broadway musical South Pacific, died of a heart attack.

== October 20, 1974 (Sunday) ==
- Voters in a referendum in Switzerland overwhelmingly rejected a proposal to evict 540,000 of the 1.4 million foreigners in the European nation, most of whom were farmhands, restaurant workers, and unskilled laborers, by January 1, 1978.
- The crime series Derrick, starring Horst Tappert, debuted on West German television.
- David Pearson won the 1974 American 500 stock car race at North Carolina Motor Speedway in Rockingham, North Carolina. By finishing third in the race, Richard Petty won the NASCAR Grand National driving championship for the fifth time.
- Born: Mohammad Sidique Khan, Pakistani-British terrorist, leader responsible for the 7 July 2005 London bombings; in Leeds, West Yorkshire (died 2005 in suicide bombing)
- Died:
  - Élie Lescot, 90, President of Haiti from 1941 to 1946, leader in World War II
  - Shathel Taqa, Minister of Foreign Affairs for Iraq, died of a heart attack while in Rabat in Morocco for a meeting of the foreign ministers of the Arab world.
  - Julien Bryan, 75, American photographer and documentarian known for his 1940 film Siege, added in 2006 to the U.S. National Film Registry as "a unique, horrifying record of the dreadful brutality of war".
  - Sampson Hosking, 86, Australian rules footballer for Port Adelaide Football Club, 2-time recipient of the Magarey Medal

== October 21, 1974 (Monday) ==
- The Wiz, a musical based on L. Frank Baum's 1900 children's book The Wonderful Wizard of Oz, but retold in the context of 1970s African-American culture and featuring an all-Black cast, was given its first performance. The show premiered at the Morris A. Mechanic Theatre in Baltimore.
- The white minority government of South Africa announced that it would increase the minimum wage paid to the nation's 400,000 black miners by 33 percent, effective December 1, though still less than the wages paid to 4,000 white miners. For the black and coloured South Africans, the increase for underground miners was to $2.28 per day from $1.71, and surface miner daily wages would increase from to $1.71 from $1.43.
- Former U.S. Ambassador to the United Nations George Bush arrived at the U.S. diplomatic mission in Beijing to begin service as the U.S. liaison to the People's Republic of China. The U.S. and China would not have full diplomatic relations until 1979.
- Died: Donald Goines, 37, African-American writer of urban fiction, and his common-law wife, Shirley Sailor, were murdered in their apartment in Highland Park, Michigan. The murders remain unsolved.

== October 22, 1974 (Tuesday) ==
- Venezuela's President Carlos Andres Perez announced that his government would nationalize the South American nation's oil industry and its iron industry before the end of the year. At the time, Venezuela, a member of OPEC, was the fifth-largest exporter of oil in the world.
- A fire in a pipeline link killed 9 people, including one American and one British oil expert, at the Kuwait Oil Company's installations in Umm al-Aish.
- A bombing at 3:30 in the morning caused $1,500 in damage to a room at the Midway Elementary School southeast of Charleston, West Virginia as violent protests over textbooks continued in Kanawha County. There were no injuries. Two men – Reverend Marvin Horan, a former truck driver and a self‐ordained Fundamentalist minister, and a young coal miner, Larry Elmer Stevens – would be found guilty of charges related to the bombing on April 18, 1975, and sentenced to three years in prison.
- The makers of the American children's television series Sesame Street filed a copyright infringement suit against Bergen Liquidators, Inc., of New Jersey, charging that the company had planned to sell defective hand puppets of characters from the series.
- The explosion of an IRA bomb thrown into a dining room at Brooks's gentlemen's club in London injured three wine stewards.
- Died: Loyd Wright, 81, American attorney, former president of the American Bar Association

== October 23, 1974 (Wednesday) ==
- Georgios Papadopoulos, the former President of Greece, and 4 other leaders of the 1967 Greek coup d'état — Stylianos Pattakos, Nikolaos Makarezos, Ioannis Ladas and Michael Roufogalis — were arrested and sent into exile on the island of Kea in the Aegean Sea.
- The International Olympic Committee awarded the 1980 Winter Olympics to Lake Placid, New York, and the 1980 Summer Olympics to Moscow. The vote for the Summer Olympics was reportedly 39 for Moscow and 22 for Los Angeles, while Lake Placid was the only location that had offered to host the Winter Olympics.
- A landslide on São Tomé Island killed over 30 people.
- In Aragon, Georgia, a maintenance train backed into a school bus, killing 7 children and injuring 73 other people. According to the bus driver, 61-year-old Billy Kellett, failure of the bus' brakes caused the accident.
- An IRA time bomb exploded shortly before midnight in the basement of the caretaker's house at Harrow School in England. There were no injuries.
- Born:
  - Aravind Adiga, Indian-Australian author; in Madras, Tamil Nadu
  - Sander Westerveld, Dutch soccer player and coach; in Enschede
- Died: Melchior Lengyel, 94, Hungarian writer, dramatist and film screenwriter

== October 24, 1974 (Thursday) ==
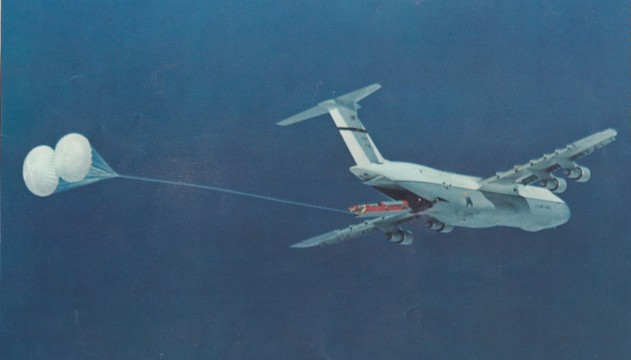
Minuteman air launch test

- The U.S. Air Force successfully fired a Minuteman I intercontinental ballistic missile (ICBM) that had been dropped from a C5A military transport aircraft at an altitude of 20,000 feet (6,100 m) off the coast of southern California. The missile was the largest object ever dropped from an airplane.
- Died:
  - Yekaterina Furtseva, 63, Soviet Minister of Culture since 1960, and the only woman in Soviet history to serve as a member of the Soviet Communist Party's ruling Politburo (serving from 1957 to 1960). Furtseva died of a heart attack, though there were rumors that Furtseva committed suicide after losing her seat in the Soviet Union's Presidium in June.
  - David Oistrakh, 66, Ukrainian violinist, died of a heart attack.
  - James C. Dozier, 89, United States Army lieutenant general, World War I Medal of Honor recipient

== October 25, 1974 (Friday) ==
- The northeastern U.S. railway network Conrail was incorporated in Pennsylvania, officially as the Consolidated Rail Corporation, to take over the operations of Penn Central Transportation Company, Erie Lackawanna Railway, Ann Arbor Railway, Lehigh Valley Railroad, Reading Company, Central Railroad of New Jersey, Lehigh and Hudson River Railway and Pennsylvania-Reading Seashore Lines. The U.S. government owned 85% of the company and its employees owned the other 15%.
- A team of six mountaineers became the first persons to climb the 20,512 ft (6,252 m) high mountain Swargarohini I West.
- Over 6,000 people attended the opening of the Sarah Mellon Scaife Gallery at the Museum of Art, Carnegie Institute, in Pittsburgh.
- Died:
  - Harriot Curtis, 93, American amateur golfer and skier and civil rights activist
  - Leon Kroll, 89, American painter, muralist and lithographer, referred to as "the dean of U.S. nude painters"
  - Rodney Young, 67, American Near Eastern archaeologist known for his excavation of the city of Gordium, capital of the ancient Phrygians and associated with the legendary King Midas.

== October 26, 1974 (Saturday) ==
- At the Scheveningen Prison in the Hague, four convicted terrorists took 22 people hostage, including several children, during a Roman Catholic Mass. Two of the criminals had been convicted for the March hijacking of a British Airways jet. After the terrorists had released all of the children and several adults, Dutch Marines and Hague police stormed the prison chapel on October 31, rescued the remaining hostages unharmed, and arrested the four terrorists.
- In the early morning hours between 2:55 and 3:35, Puerto Rican separatists of the Fuerzas Armadas de Liberación Nacional Puertorriqueña (FALN) terrorist group set off five bombs in Manhattan, with the largest bomb set off in New York's Financial District. Despite the damage, there were no injuries.
- Died:
  - Bidia Dandaron, 59, Soviet Buddhist author and teacher, died in a Soviet labor camp.
  - Thomas J. Herbert, 79, American politician, former Governor of Ohio
  - Bennett E. Siegelstein, 93, Romanian-born American lawyer and politician

== October 27, 1974 (Sunday) ==
- A crowd of 20,000 people attended a rally at Madison Square Garden in New York City in support of Puerto Rican independence. Juan Mari Brás, secretary-general of the Puerto Rican Socialist Party, was the principal speaker at the rally; other speakers included Angela Davis and Jane Fonda. At a post-rally news conference, Mari Brás disclaimed knowledge of the sponsors of the previous day's FALN bombings in Manhattan, but added, "I do not condemn it."
- A two-year experiment in the U.S. to make Daylight Saving Time last year round, and abolish the practice of turning clocks one hour forward in the autumn, ended ten months after it had gone into effect on January 6, 1974, after complaints about the effect of the Emergency Daylight Saving Time Energy Conservation Act, which had turned clocks back in the middle of winter and was intended to stay in effect for at least two years. The U.S. Congress repealed the act on September 30, 1974.
- Died:
  - James M. Cox Jr., 71, American businessman, chairman of Cox Enterprises and Cox Broadcasting Corporation
  - Rudolf Dassler, 76, German cobbler, Nazi Party member, and founder of sportswear company Puma, died of lung cancer.
  - Paul Frankeur, 69, French actor, died of a heart attack.
  - C. P. Ramanujam, 36, Indian mathematician, committed suicide by barbiturate overdose.

== October 28, 1974 (Monday) ==
- The Soviet Union launched the robotic lunar lander Luna 23 toward the Moon, with the goal of drilling 2.5 metres (8.2 ft) into the lunar service, collecting a sample, and returning the sample to Earth. When Luna 23 landed on the Moon on November 6, however, it tipped over and was unable to carry out its mission.
- The Equal Credit Opportunity Act (prohibiting discrimination based on race, gender and other non-financial characteristics of applicants) and its amendment, the Fair Credit Billing Act (protecting consumers from unfair billing practices and giving them remedies for fixing problems), were signed into law by U.S. President Ford.
- A Provisional Irish Republican Army bomb exploded inside a stolen truck near Abercorn Barracks at Ballykinler, Northern Ireland, and destroyed the two-story Sandes Home for Soldiers, killing British soldiers Alan Coughlin and Michael Swanick and injuring 31 other people. On the same day in Birmingham, England, an attempt was made by the Provisional IRA against UK Sports Minister Denis Howell, using a car bomb. Howell's wife and 10-year-old son were in the car but were unhurt.
- Westpark Mustard, a racing greyhound dog, set a record when she made her 20th consecutive win in racing. Westpark Mustard broke the record of 19 in a row set by Mick the Miller in 1930. Coincidentally, her 20th win came in the Mick the Miller Record Stakes. Westpark Mustard lost the next race she ran, ending her streak at 20.
- Born:
  - Joaquin Phoenix (born Joaquin Rafael Bottom and also billed as Leaf Phoenix), American film actor; in San Juan, Puerto Rico
  - Nelly Ciobanu, Moldovan singer; in Cania, Moldavian Soviet Socialist Republic, Soviet Union
- Died:
  - Louis Saillant, 73, French trade unionist and Resistance fighter, former general secretary of the World Federation of Trade Unions (WFTU), died of a heart attack.
  - Walter David Jones CH, CBE, 78, Welsh painter and modernist poet known for In Parenthesis and The Anathemata
  - Everaldo Marques da Silva, Brazilian footballer with 24 caps for the World Cup-winning national team from 1967 to 1972, was killed in a car accident.

== October 29, 1974 (Tuesday) ==
- Former U.S. President Richard Nixon, who had resigned less than three months earlier following the Watergate scandal, was in critical condition after he went into vascular shock six hours after surgery to remove a blood clot from his leg. Nixon remained in the intensive care unit at Long Beach Memorial Medical Center for one week and was released from the hospital on November 14.
- An earthquake near Tuzla, Yugoslavia (now in Bosnia and Herzegovina), left about 500 people homeless.
- The Federal Fire Prevention and Control Act of 1974 was signed into law by U.S. President Ford in order to provide federal funding for educating the general public about how to avoid fires. The legislation followed a report that 12,000 people were killed and 50,000 seriously injured every year by fires. The Act established the National Fire Prevention and Control Administration, the National Academy for Fire Prevention and Control, and a National Fire Data Center.
- New York City Fire Department firefighters Russell T. Linneball and Johnnie Williams were electrocuted when an aluminum ladder they were lowering after a warehouse fire in the Bronx came into contact with an 11,000-volt power line.
- Born:
  - Akashdeep Saigal, Indian television actor and model; in Bombay, Maharashtra
  - Yenny Wahid (born Zannuba Ariffah Chafsoh), Indonesian activist and politician; in Jombang Regency, East Java
- Died: Harry Kalven, 60, American jurist and legal scholar, died of a heart attack.

== October 30, 1974 (Wednesday) ==
- Muhammad Ali regained the world heavyweight boxing title, defeating George Foreman by knockout in the 8th round of a bout at the 20th of May Stadium in Kinshasa, Zaire, billed as "The Rumble in the Jungle". American writer Jay Caspian Kang would later call the fight "arguably the greatest sporting event of the 20th century."
- The crash of Panarctic Oils Flight 416 killed 32 of the 34 people aboard, most of them oil technicians for Panarctic Oils. The Lockheed L-188 Electra came down 2.5 nautical miles (4.6 km; 2.9 mi) short of the airstrip on Melville Island in Canada's Northwest Territories, then sank through the Arctic ice cap.
- Serial killer Carl Eugene Watts, suspected in the murders of at least 14 people, committed the first known homicide for which he was convicted, killing 20-year-old Gloria Steele in Kalamazoo, Michigan.
- Died: Begum Akhtar (born Akhtaribai Faizabadi), 60, Indian singer and actress, reportedly died of stress from singing too high at her final concert.

== October 31, 1974 (Thursday) ==
- A cigarette ignited a bag of fireworks aboard an express train in northern India, causing an explosion and fire that killed 52 people.
- The initial flight of the IAR-93 Vultur, the first jet fighter aircraft produced entirely in Romania, was made by Colonel Gheorghe Stănică, who took off from Bacău and landed again after a 21-minute test fiight.
- In the Houston suburb of Deer Park, Texas, American optician Ronald Clark O'Bryan murdered his 8-year-old son Timothy with cyanide-laced Halloween candy for $40,000 in life insurance money. O'Bryan also provided the poisoned candy to his daughter and 3 other children, none of whom ate it. O'Bryan himself would be poisoned in an execution by lethal injection in 1984.
- Born:
  - Fred Perpall, Bahamas-born African-American architect and businessman, CEO of The Beck Group since 2013, and president of the United States Golf Association since 2023; in Nassau, Bahamas
  - Natasja Saad, Danish singer and rap artist; in Copenhagen (killed in car accident, 2007)
- Died:
  - Mikheil Chiaureli, 80, Soviet Georgian filmmaker known for directing The Fall of Berlin
  - Mordecai Ezekiel, 75, American agrarian economist
  - Buddy Myer (born Charles Solomon Myer), 70, American Major League Baseball second baseman, 1935 American League batting champion
  - Maxwell Reed, 55, Northern Irish actor, died of cancer.
