= FCBA =

FCBA can refer to

- Future Carrier Borne Aircraft, see Joint Combat Aircraft
- Federal Circuit Bar Association
- Federal Communications Bar Association
- Fair Credit Billing Act (1974)
- sometimes: Federación Cubana de Béisbol
