= Tadhg Barry =

Irish republican (1880–1921)

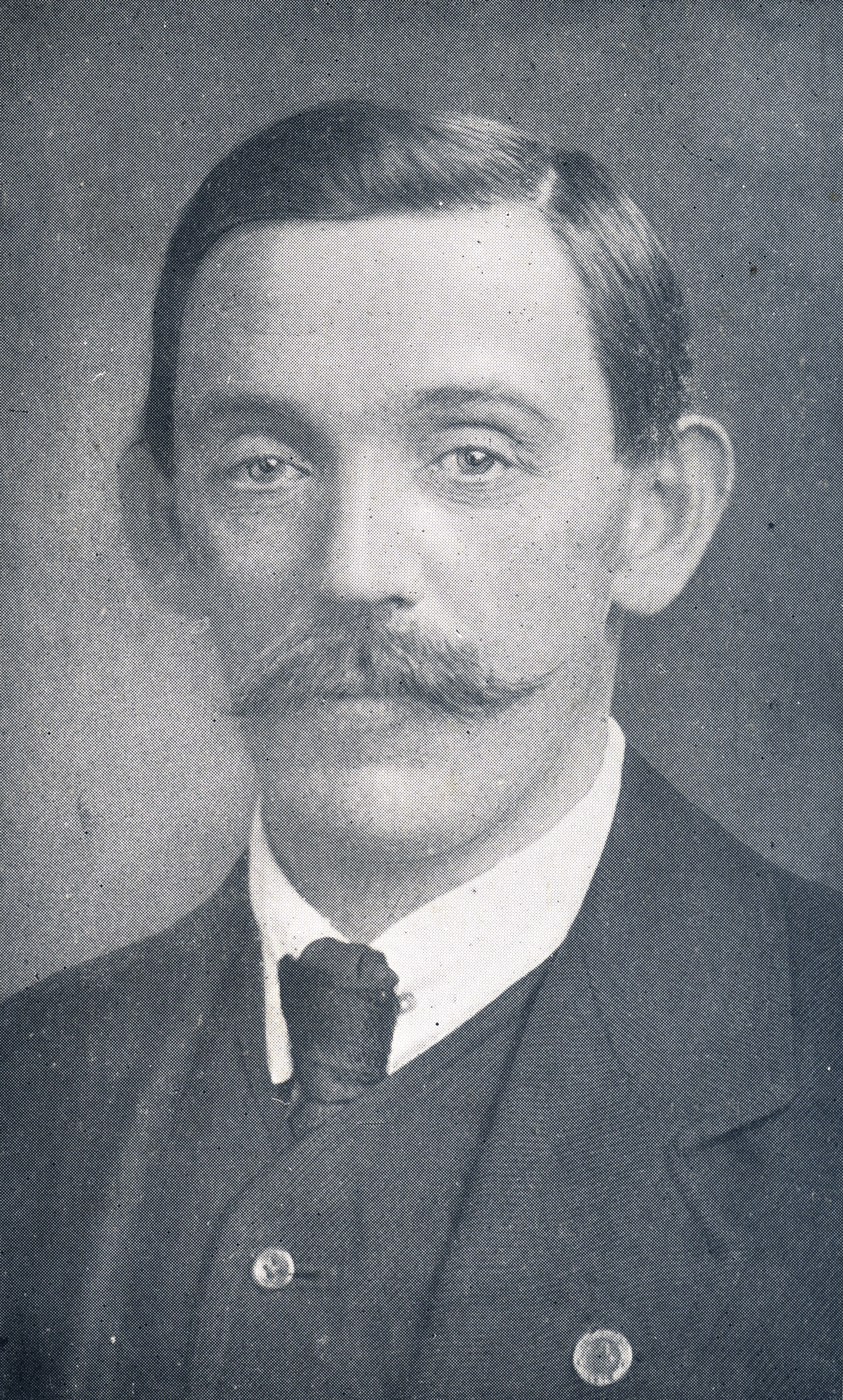

Personal details
- Born: 1880 Cork, County Cork, Ireland
- Died: 15 November 1921 (aged 40–41) Abercorn Barracks, Ballykinler, County Down, Northern Ireland
- Party: Sinn Féin

Tadhg Barry (1880 – 15 November 1921) was a veteran Irish republican, leading trade unionist, journalist, poet, Gaelic Athletic Association official, and alderman on Cork Corporation who was actively involved in, and eventually was killed during, the Irish revolutionary period.

== Background ==
Tadhg Barry was born in 1880 to a working-class family in Cork, Ireland. He was schooled at the Blarney Street National School and later the North Monastery. After school, Barry worked for four years at Our Lady's Asylum until 1909, when his interest in journalism led to him becoming a staff writer at the newly founded Cork Accent. Between 1910 and 1916, he worked at the Cork Free Press, a paper which competed with the Redmondite (Home Rule advocating) Cork Examiner.

Barry had an interest in the Gaelic Athletic Association and reported upon the sports of hurling and camogie under the penname "An Ciotóg" (meaning the "left-hander" or "clumsy one"). He was also a delegate to both county and national GAA boards, a referee, and he trained the first camogie team in Cork. In 1916, Barry wrote the first book on the subject of hurling, entitled Hurling and how to play it.

== Entry into politics ==
In the 1900s, Barry began to be drawn into the world of politics. In c. 1906 he became a founding member and secretary of the Cork Branch of Sinn Féin as well becoming a leading member of the Cork Branch of the Irish Transport and General Workers' Union (ITGWU). In 1911, alongside fellow prominent nationalists in Cork Tomas MacCurtain and Sean O’Hegarty, he had become part of Fianna Éireann, a Boy Scout organisation with an Irish nationalist political outlook. Taking his Fianna experience forward, In 1913 he helped found the Cork Corps of the Irish Volunteers, an armed Irish nationalist organised primary founded to fight the Ulster Volunteers should they have attempted to resist Home Rule in Ireland. In 1914, when the Volunteers split into two factions, Barry aligned with rump Volunteers who vowed not to fight for the British Empire during World War I but instead remain in Ireland.

Tadhg shared a platform with James Connolly in Cork on two separate occasions and was on active service during the 1916 Easter Rising, when Irish nationalists rose up in rebellion in Dublin. In 1917, Barry was selected as a Cork delegate to the historic October Sinn Féin convention in the Mansion House, a meeting which attempted to unify all elements of the now surging nationalist movement into one force which would advocate (and fight) for an independent Irish Republic free of control from the British Empire. That same year, Barry was arrested by British authorities on the ground he had delivered a "seditious speech" and was imprisoned for a time until he was freed following a hunger strike.

Barry was arrested on 30 January 1918 in the city council chamber of Cork and charged with being a conspirator in the so-called German Plot, which British authorities alleged was a plan by members of Sinn Féin to collude with the German Empire to bring firearms to Ireland.

Upon his release in 1919, he became the full-time Branch Secretary to the ITGWU in Cork and was involved with the Irish soviets, a series of strikes by rural Irish workers mainly across Munster. In 1920, Barry was elected to the position of Alderman in Cork, placing him in a position of power alongside the now Lord Mayor Tomas MacCurtain and newly elected MP Terence MacSwiney.

1920 was a tumultuous year all around in Cork. The Irish War of Independence had erupted and Munster was a particular hotbed of activity. On 20 March 1920, Tomás Mac Curtain, whom had become an officer in the newly formed Irish Republican Army, was killed in front of his wife and children in an assassination by members of the Royal Irish Constabulary, the British controlled police force in Ireland. This incident caused widespread unrest in Cork. Terence MacSwiney succeeded Mac Curtain as Lord Mayor of Cork, only to die in October following a hunger strike protesting his own arrest. MacSwiney's death was a matter not just of national but also of international news, particularly in the United States of America. Not much longer after MacSwiney's death, Cork was devastated by the Burning of Cork in December, when members of the Black and Tans torched the city in act of arson born out of anger from losses to the IRA. Amongst the many buildings damaged or destroyed in the fire was ITGWU's Connolly Memorial Hall, the headquarters of the Labour Movement in Cork.

== Imprisonment and death ==
In the wake of MacSwiney's death, Cork's municipal bodies once again gathered to elect a new Lord Mayor. Barry and eight other councillors were arrested. Barry was transported to Ballykinlar internment camp in County Down, where he was placed with 2000 other arrested Irish Nationalists including Seán Lemass and Peadar Kearney. Barry attempted to keep busy while incarcerated. He taught Irish to his fellow prisoners as well as preaching Socialism. He kept a Red flag flown over his quarters, much to his jailers' chagrin.

On 15 November 1921 Barry was conversing with fellow inmates at the edge of the camp and bidding them farewell. What exactly followed is unknown, but the result is not: Barry was shot dead by a young sentry guard, Private A. Barrett, who later claimed Barry had been making an attempt to escape the camp. An eyewitness account of Barry's death was provided by another inmate, Seán D. MacLochlainn, who by his own account was standing next to Barry when he was shot. According to MacLochlainn's account Barry was standing in a line of inmates waving farewell to those leaving when they were asked to move back, when the group refused Barry was shot dead. The statement also describes the shooting of two other prisoners named as Tormey and Sloane. A coroner's inquest into his death was inconclusive, and a trial held on his death resulted in a jury unable to agree on a verdict. The British authorities failed to produce either the sentry or his superiors for cross-examination. A secret report on Barry's death, created by the army's 6th Division for the inquest, recalled him memorably as ‘a mischievous socialist, Bolshevist, or Sinn Féiner, as the occasion demanded’, and as an ‘utter disloyalist’.

Thousands turned out in every town to view the funeral cortege en route to Dublin where, on 19 November, 30,000 marched with the coffin. As the train bringing his body home to Cork passed through Kilmallock, County Limerick, 300 creamery strikers and supporters paraded through the town under the red flag. Barry's subsequent funeral drew an enormous crowd with 30,000 in attendance, chief amongst them Cork's own Michael Collins, who had left the on-going Anglo-Irish Treaty negotiations in order to attend. Barry's death was one of the last during the Irish War of Independence, peace talks led to the ratifying of the Anglo-Irish Treaty (6 December 1921). Tadgh Barry is buried in St. Finbarr's Cemetery, Cork.
