= The Troubles in Ballykinler =

Incidents in Ballykinler, Northern Ireland during the Troubles

The Troubles in Ballykinler recounts incidents during, and the effects of, The Troubles in Ballykinler, County Down, Northern Ireland.

Incidents in Ballykinler during the Troubles resulting in two or more fatalities:

1974

- 28 October 1974 - Michael Swanick (20) and Alan Coughlan (22), both members of the British Army, were killed in a Provisional Irish Republican Army van bomb attack outside Abercorn Barracks. Private Swanick was a member of the Duke of Edinburgh's Royal Regiment and Corporal Coughlan also a member of the Duke of Edinburgh's Royal Regiment.

In 1986 a memorial stone to the two soldiers who died was unveiled outside a new Sandes home built on the site of the one destroyed.

== See also ==
- Ballykinler
