= Elise Sandes =

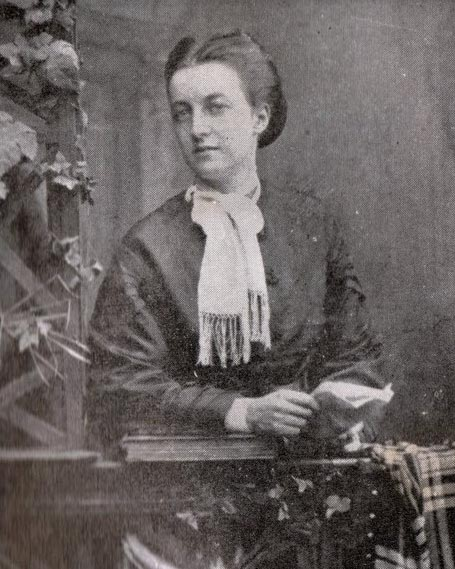
Elise Sandes

Elise Sandes (1851 – August 1934) was the founder of a welfare movement for soldiers that bears her name and still survives today. She was an evangelical Christian and philanthropist and her concern for a young soldier in Tralee in the late 1860s led her to set up a centre for soldiers' recreation and general welfare. By 1913 there were thirty-one such 'soldiers' homes' all situated in the vicinity of various army barracks; twenty-two were in Ireland and the rest in British India. It is widely regarded that Sandes Homes for Soldiers were very well run and filled a real need among young soldiers, often far from their families who were made to feel at home and not faced with the cold commercial atmosphere of the barracks canteen. Sandes believed that a good feminine influence met a real need where young soldiers were concerned, and the 'homes' were the only place where some of the young recruits could receive anything approaching motherly care.

Only three Sandes homes remained open in the Irish Free State after 1921, but there were still 20 homes in total in the late 1920s, most of them in India. In recognition of her work as a humanitarian and her dedication to the soldiers' general well-being Elise Sandes is one of only two civilian women to be buried with full military honours – the other being her successor Eva Maguire.

== Early life ==
Elizabeth Anne (Elise) Sandes was born in 1851 in Oak Villa in Oakpark, Tralee into a relatively wealthy family, which had been settled at Sallow Glen, near Tarbert, County Kerry, for several generations. Her parents were Stephen Creagh Sandes, an Army officer, and Mary Anne Ponsonby. An earlier Stephen Creagh Sandes, Bishop of Cashel, Emly, Waterford and Lismore (died 1842), was a cousin. She had six sisters and two brothers and was described as being a very clever child with an imaginative mind and studious nature. She remembered reading books and writing letters even before she first entered a school classroom. Among her friends on the next estate was the boy who would later become the famous senior British Army officer Earl Kitchener. Sandes was devastated by the death of her father in 1866 when she was just fifteen years of age, and sought solace in the companionship of her good friend Mary Fry. Together the girls resolved to do God's work in helping to lead others towards Christianity. At this time, regiments of British soldiers were stationed in many parts of Ireland and Mary was moved with compassion to see how young lads of around eighteen years of age were being drawn away into bad company and falling deeper and deeper into sin. Mary began to invite the young soldiers to her home and encouraged them to converse and ask questions. Elise's interest was aroused and together the two women worked and prayed together for the young soldiers. Sadly, Mary died not long after these early exchanges, but just before she died she had asked Elise to befriend a young soldier stationed not far from her home in Tralee.

== Sandes Homes for Soldiers ==
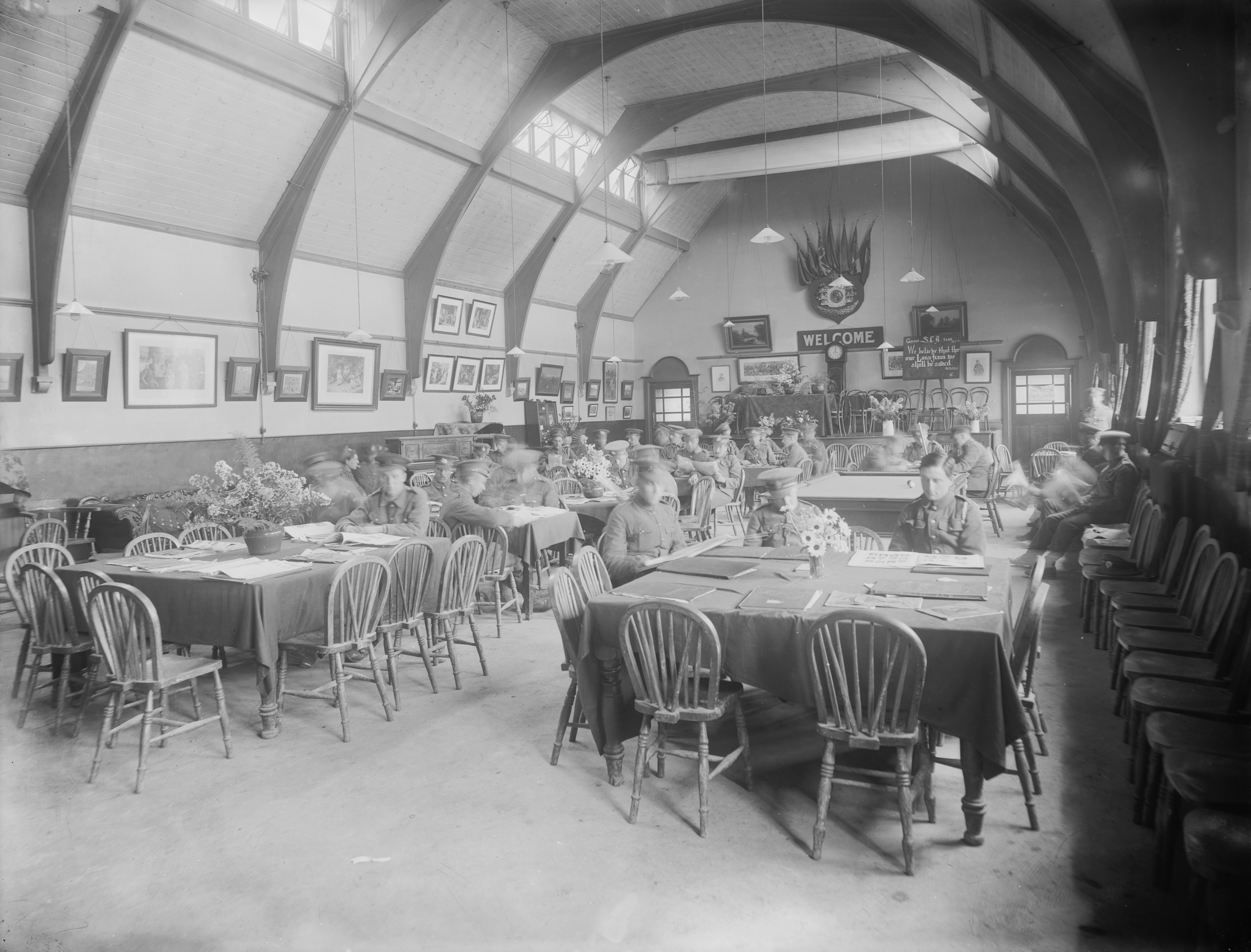
Reading Room, Elise Sandes Soldiers Home, Curragh

In 1869 she invited that young soldier and his friends to her mother's house in Oak Villa for regular sessions of Bible study, prayers, hymn-singing, as well as lessons in reading and writing. Soldiers gladly accepted the invitation and by 1871 the meetings had to be moved to a new location in Nelson Street to accommodate the swelling numbers. Initially, she had felt particularly sorry for the drummer boys (ten to a regiment) who had been recruited into the Army at just fifteen years of age, and yet there were just as many hardened men in the ranks seeking the same friendship and sympathy. Shortly after the regiment had been posted to Cork, she met the soldiers again and discovered how much they missed the friendly atmosphere of the rooms in Tralee. It was also apparent that since arriving in Cork many of the soldiers had since fallen prey to the destructive effects of alcohol and needed help. Elise resolved to find alternative premises in Cork for this purpose and eventually rooms in King Street were purchased for £259 due to the generosity of a retired Naval Officer. It was here that the first 'Sandes Home for Soldiers' opened its doors on 10 June 1877.

Although the movement is officially registered as being founded in 1869, the new premises in Cork was the first building to bear the name, its stated purpose being to steer young soldiers away from the evils of drink and offer them an accommodating centre for companionship, entertainment and self-improvement. The house was a plain ordinary dwelling-house, but Elise made every effort to ensure that the rooms were bright and cosy, and that the atmosphere in the homes was always welcoming. The prayers and religious services were always provided on a voluntary basis for the soldiers. The ground floor of the first homes typically had a tea room, a meeting room and a reading room, while the top floor had private accommodation for the proprietors Very soon, many more homes were established in widely scattered, remote locations of the British Empire.

"I try to make my Homes not institutes or clubs or mission halls, but in the truest sense of the word 'HOMES' that any Christian mother would allow for her boys, I feel free to have for my soldiers." Elise Sandes 1877

There was no shortage of willing helpers ready to assist Elise – many gave life service towards steering men away from sin and onto the path of virtue. Elise Sandes was a charismatic leader who had a profound impact on all who met her.

Bryan MacMahon writes in the History Ireland magazine about the setting up of the Belfast home:

Elise Sandes set up a second home in Belfast in March 1891 in Clifton Street, opposite Victoria Barracks. Very soon, homes in Dublin, Ballincollig, Queenstown and Dundalk became part of a growing network, and Elise Sandes' dream of having a home in every garrison town in Ireland was fast becoming a reality. In 1899 the opening of a home in the Curragh, where there were 5,000 soldiers, was particularly gratifying to Elise Sandes. The erection of 'canvas homes' in South Africa during the Boer war led to a similar type of temporary home for the summer months in army camps like Coolmoney in the Glen of Imaal, Co. Wicklow.

The women in charge were addressed as 'mother', and it is clear from the many testimonies of grateful soldiers that they created a 'homely atmosphere for lonely men, some of whom were alcoholics. Many men came to see themselves as saved in body and spirit, and some went on to become evangelical missionaries.

But contemporary reports indicate that when Miss Sandes was first planning a Home in Belfast in September 1887, there were already Homes established in Dublin, The Curragh and Limerick as well as the original location in Cork. Miss Sandes attended a meeting in Belfast to kick-start the project, talking about the operation and benefits of the Home in Cork. The description of the operations there include: "religions and temperance meetings for the benefit of those who wished to attend them; there were also reading, recreation, smoking, and coffee rooms for social intercourse. The Home was crowded nightly."

=== Sandes Homes in British India ===
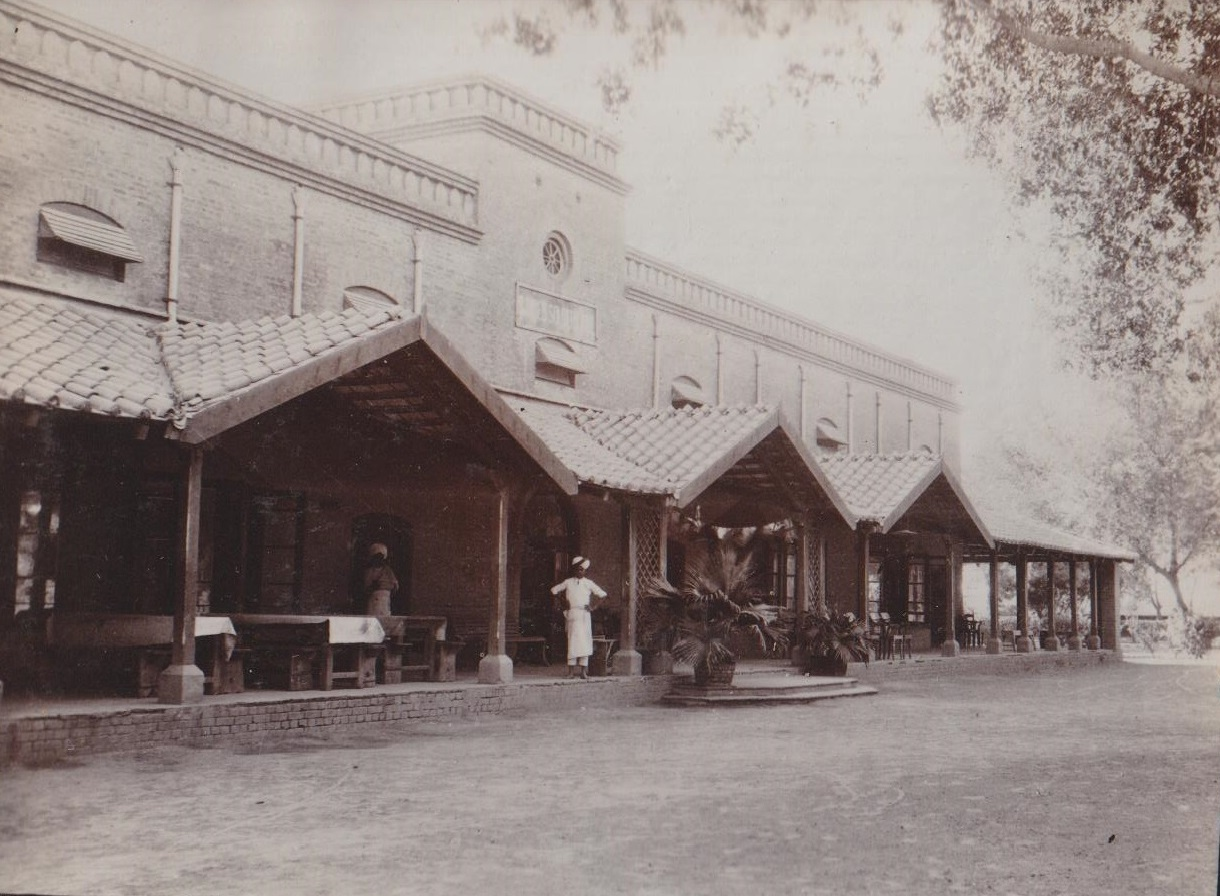
Sande's Soldiers' Home in Ambala, India; c1919

There was a tradition of military service and associations with India in the Sandes family. Elise's uncle had been registrar-general of Calcutta and a plantation owner, and her sister, the wife of an officer, had died in Rawalpindi. Elise was well aware of the discomfort, loneliness and tedium of a soldier's life in India – the awful boredom of barrack-room life between spells of repetitive drilling and rigid discipline. The soldiers found themselves cast into an environment where supplies and medical care were rudimentary and the dangers of cholera, dysentery and venereal disease were ever-present. She responded to military requests for homes to be set up there with the aim of drawing soldiers away from the wet canteens, opium dens and bazaar brothels to more wholesome recreations. Anna Ashe set up the first home in Rawalpindi, with £600 from a donor, and Theodora Schofield and Alice Bailey followed her lead by setting up additional homes in Murree, Quetta, Meerut, and Lucknow. Elise Sandes now resolved to establish a Sandes Home in every cantonment in India. By now she had become widely known as the Mother of the British Army owing to that special 'Sandes' dedication towards providing the much-needed care and attention that the young soldiers required. She coined the phrase 'A Home From Home' which summed up perfectly her vision of the kind of environment she strove to provide

=== World War One ===
Elise Sandes was in Coolmoney camp in 1914 when war was declared. Army camps rapidly expanded with the calling up of thousands of reserves and new recruits, and she and her helpers quickly became familiar with the horror of war as reported in the many letters sent from the trenches. The scale of the casualties was appalling and it was apparent that some of the men were mere boys, clearly below the legal age for active service. The work of these humanitarians for over four years was to prepare men, who had little idea of the horrors of mechanised warfare, for the strong possibility of death. Along with prayers, there were practical supports: parcels sent to men at the front, with food, clothing, books, magazines and treats. Women went on board troopships before they sailed, handing out postcards and pencils for soldiers to send a last message home.

== Death ==
With the establishment of the Irish Free State, most of the homes in Ireland became obsolete and were closed and Elise Sandes departed from the Curragh on 3 August 1922. She moved to a new home in Ballykinlar, Co. Down, where she died in August 1934. She was buried in nearby Tyrella, with full military honours. Elise Sandes and her successor, Eva Maguire, are the only civilian women to have received this distinction. Both women were also awarded the CBE and OBE respectively. Elise Sandes' simple headstone reads: ‘For 66 years the friend of soldiers’.

=== Closure of Sandes' homes ===
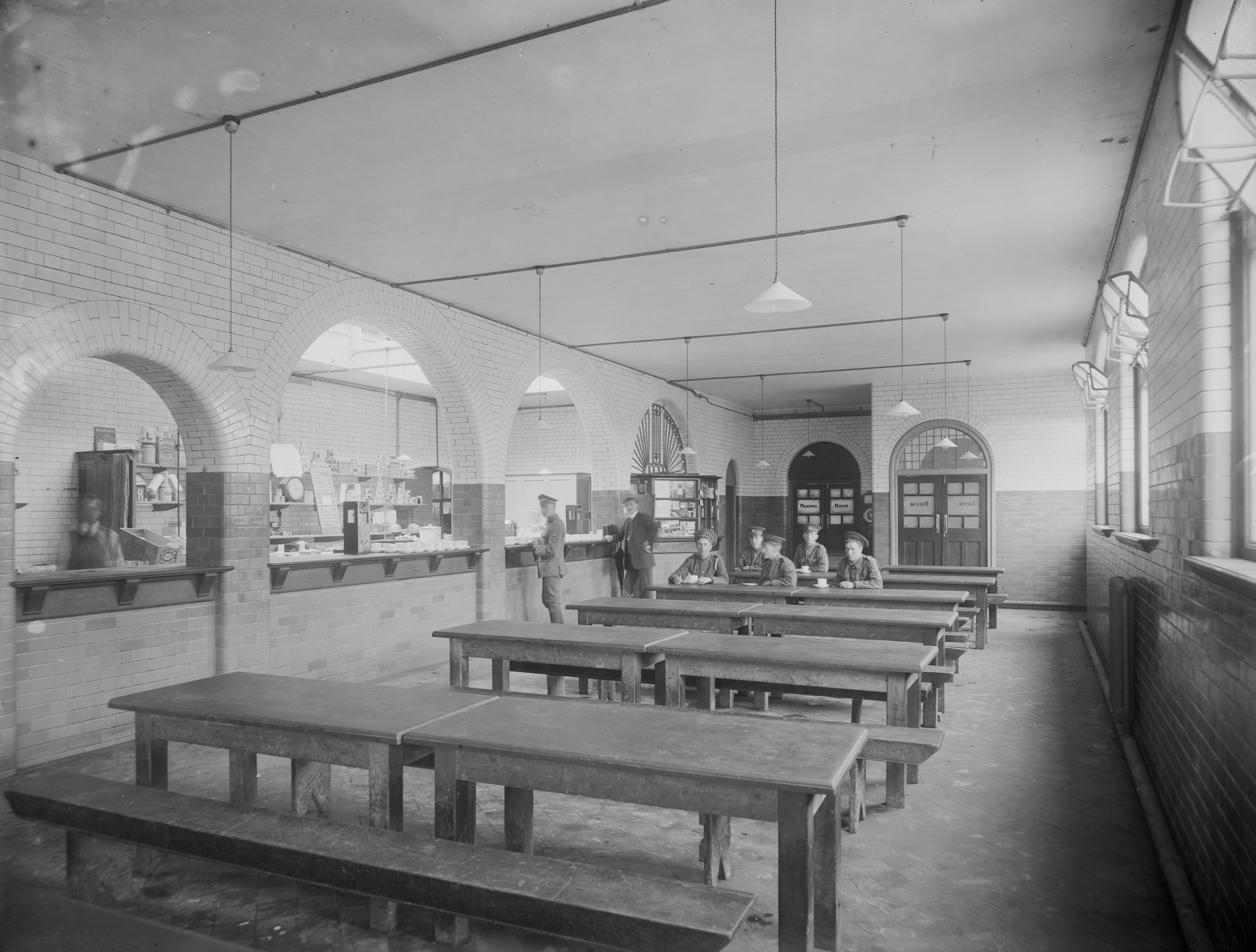
Dining Room, Elise Sandes Soldiers Home, Curragh Camp

All the homes in India closed in 1947 when the former dominion finally gained its independence and the British departed. For a short period after World War II, there were homes in diverse locations such as Borneo, Hong Kong, Jamaica, Malaysia, Singapore and even Iceland. None of these international centres survive today. Three of the homes in Ireland remained open for considerably longer: one in the Curragh, at the request of the Irish Army, one in Cobh (Queenstown) and one in Dublin. These last two closed soon after, but the home in the Curragh remained open until the 1980s, surviving mainly on account of the determination of the women who ran it.

=== 1974 Bombing ===
The Sandes Soldiers Home at Abercorn Barracks, Ballykinler was bombed in a terrorist attack by the Provisional Irish Republican Army on 28 October 1974. A 300lb bomb had been concealed in the back of a delivery van parked on the opposite side of the road from the Sandes Home building which caught fire and was gutted within minutes. Lance Corporal Alan Coughlin and Private Michael Swanick of 1st Battalion Duke of Edinburgh's Royal Regiment (Berks and Wilts) lost their lives. Another thirty-one soldiers of the Battalion and two civilians were injured in the attack. In 1986 a memorial stone dedicated to the two soldiers who died was unveiled outside a new Sandes Home built on the site as the one that had been destroyed.

== Sandes Today ==
Today the organisation survives as 'Sandes Soldiers' and Airmen's Centres' in Thievpal Barracks, Lisburn, Ballykinlar and Holywood in Northern Ireland, and Pirbright and Harrogate in Great Britain. The staff consists of eighteen full-time workers. Since those humble beginnings in 1869, Sandes has become an integral part of the military community and is recognised as such. Over the years Sandes has adapted to meet the changing needs of each new generation of servicemen and women.
