= Abercorn Barracks =

Former military base and internment camp in Northern Ireland

- Ballykinler
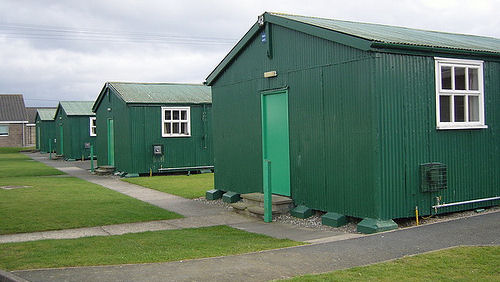
- Abercorn Barracks

Site information
- Type: Barracks
- Owner: Down G.A.A.
- Operator: British Army

Location
- Location within Northern Ireland
- Coordinates: 54°15′26″N 05°48′01″W

Site history
- Built: 1901
- Built for: War Office
- In use: 1901- 2018

Abercorn Barracks, sometimes referred to as Ballykinlar Barracks or Ballykinler Barracks, is a former military base in Ballykinler in County Down, Northern Ireland. The surrounding training area is retained by the Ministry of Defence.

== Early history ==
The Ballykinler Barracks were built in 1901 at the time of the Boer War but often spelled "Ballykinlar". They were renamed Abercorn Barracks in 1949 in honour of James Hamilton, 3rd Duke of Abercorn who was the first Governor of Northern Ireland.

== Internment ==
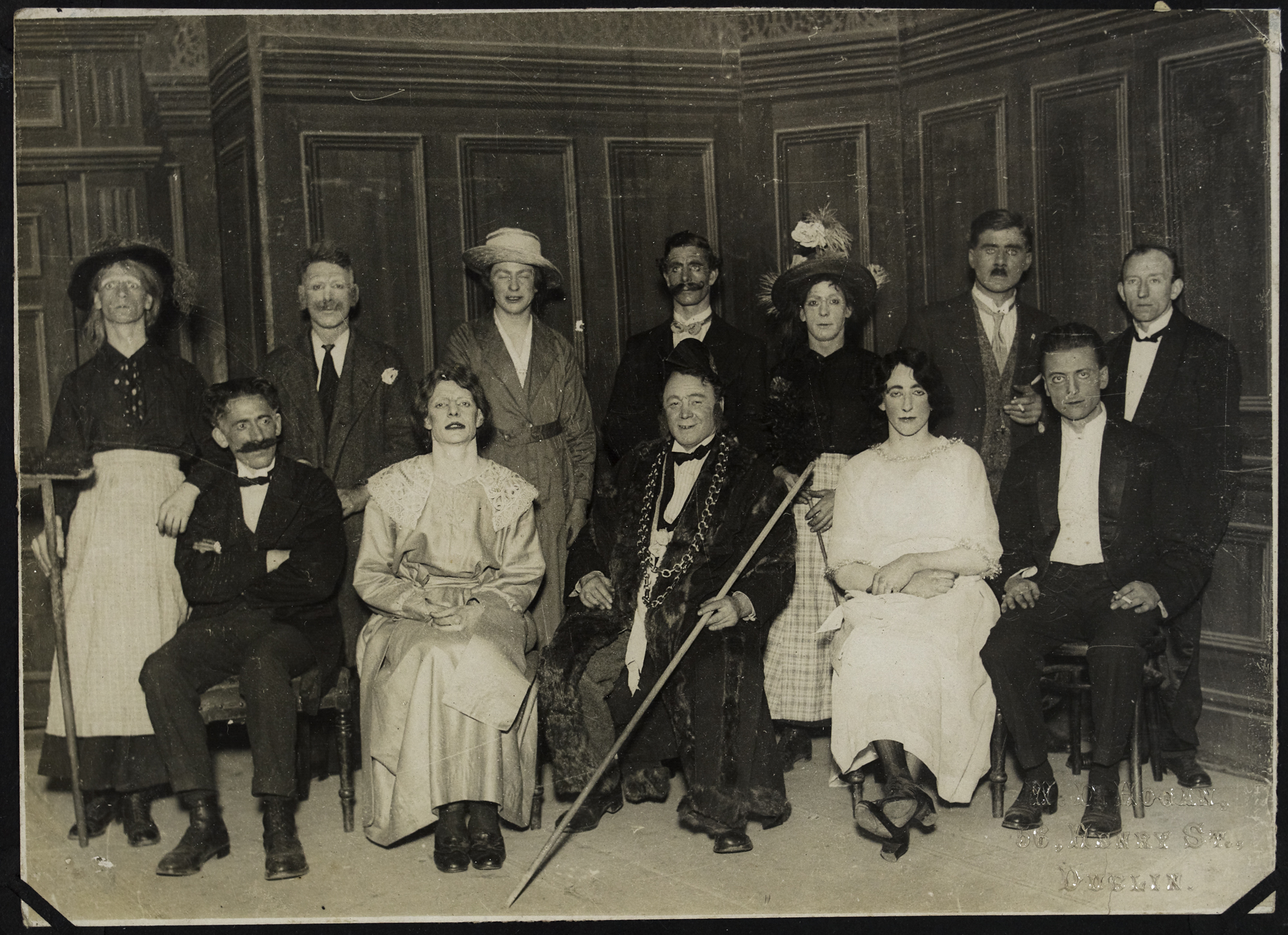
A troupe of prisoners performing during their period of internment (1921)

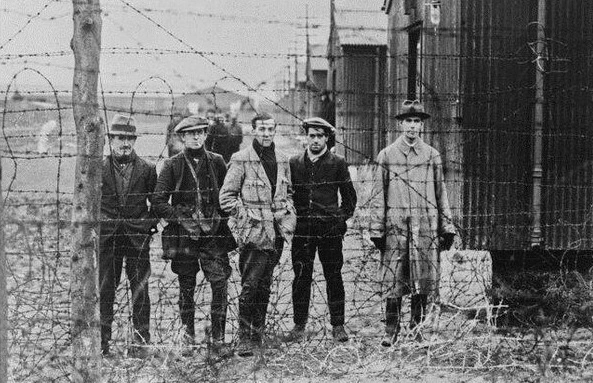
Irish republican internees, 1920

The sprawling site was pressed into service as an internment camp during the Irish War of Independence in 1919. After the Partition of Ireland, the new Government of Northern Ireland continued to use the base for internment. There appear to have been attempts by those incarcerated to maintain a normal social structure within the confines of the camp and evidence exists of an orchestra and some examples of typical prisoner art are still available for viewing in museum collections in Ireland, including examples of humorous cartoons. 'Camp tokens' also circulated within the camp in place of money, being made of printed cardboard.

A former Irish Republican Army (IRA) prisoner, Louis Joseph Walsh (a native of County Londonderry and later a judge in County Donegal), published a book in 1921 about his experiences in various institutions in Northern Ireland including a chapter about his time in Ballykinlar Camp which describes, amongst other things, having to march for three miles, handcuffed and carrying luggage, only to be placed in bare huts with nothing to sleep in except damp straw. He continues in a second chapter to describe how the prisoners set up their own 'Council' which then began to negotiate with the military authorities for better food and conditions within the camp. "The camp regime was notoriously brutal - prisoners were shot dead for minor infractions, such as standing too close to the barbed wire fence that kept them penned in (the camp magazine was titled Barbed Wire)."

Ballykinlar internment camp housed over 2,000 men from the thirty-two counties of Ireland and was the first mass internment camp in Ireland during the Irish War of Independence.

Three prisoners were shot dead and five died of malnourishment/maltreatment in Ballykinlar in 1921: two Westmeath volunteers - Patrick Sloan and Joseph Tormey were shot and killed on 17 January 1921, Tadhg Barry was shot and killed on 15 November 1921. Maurice Galvin died on 9 April 1921 as a result of serious head injuries sustained when loyalists attacked a prison boat in the Lagan River, Belfast (possibly the Prison Ship HMS Argenta). Séan (Jack) O’Sullivan died on 3 May 1921 as a result of a severe beating which allegedly occurred at the time of his arrest. Patrick O'Toole died of pneumonia on 6 February 1921 probably from a cold contracted while being transported on a Royal Navy destroyer to Ballykinlar and Maurice Quinn died on 6 July 1921. Notable internees included Seán Lemass (future Taoiseach) and Peadar Kearney, who wrote the Irish national anthem.

After peace was declared in 1921 the internees were released but it does appear that their ordeal did not necessarily end after leaving as evidence exists that a train carrying released prisoners from Ballykinlar was attacked at Thurles, County Tipperary, injuring three Sinn Féin passengers and several members of the crowd.

In 1971, during Operation Demetrius, which reimposed internment in Northern Ireland, Ballykinlar became a Regional Holding Centre for internees. During this time there were many allegations of physical and mental abuse by Royal Military Police and Royal Ulster Constabulary Special Branch personnel at Ballykinlar.

== Military uses ==
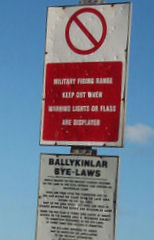
Sign indicating restricted access

During the First World War the 36th Ulster Division formed from the Ulster Volunteers did much of its training at Ballykinlar. A journalist of the time writing in the Belfast Newsletter waxed lyrical about the location describing it as a "camp situated in the centre of picturesque country, with the mountains of Mourne forming an imposing background. On the edge of the camping ground, and within easy walking distance of the tents, is an arm of Dundrum Bay, and here the men will have swimming and bathing drills. Within sight of the camp is the beautifully situated demesne of Tyrella." Later in the war, the camp housed soldiers recovering from injury or illness with nearly 4000 men resident in 1917.

During the Second World War the camp continued to be a military training establishment and the North Irish Horse record moving there to take over Valentine Tanks and convert to an armoured regiment. Troops from the United States, including those from the 1st Armored Division also trained at Ballykinlar.

The camp also held German and Italian prisoners of war. The prisoners built a football pitch which was used after the war for training by both the English and Scottish national sides before Home Championship matches against Northern Ireland. On 10 February 1940 the IRA raided the barracks in search of weapons. The raid was successful and yielded guns, maps, photographs and information on troop movements. During this time several troops stationed there were convicted of selling weapons to the IRA.

The year 1974 saw the Troubles come to Ballykinler when a 300 lb Provisional Irish Republican Army van bomb killed two British Army soldiers, injured many others and destroyed the Sandes Homes for Soldiers on the base. The dead servicemen were Private Swanick, a member of the Duke of Edinburgh's Royal Regiment, and Lance Corporal Alan Coughlan, a member of the Royal Welch Fusiliers.

The base was used as a training centre in the 1970s and 1980s by the Ulster Defence Regiment whose 3rd (County Down) Battalion was also based there.

As peace has returned to Northern Ireland the British troops based there were withdrawn from the streets with the ending of Operation Banner and became garrison troops. In 2008 it was announced that the 2nd Battalion of The Rifles based at Ballykinlar would be deployed to Kosovo to "combat fresh violence between ethnic Albanians and minority Serbs."

Sandes Home, the civilian charity which provides leisure and restaurant facilities in some bases, has had a presence at Ballykinlar Camp for over 100 years. In early 2009 a car bomb was found close to the base, which was thought to have been abandoned by dissident republicans.

== Later military use and closure ==
Major renovation was carried out at the Barracks in 2008 and the camp then had 290 married quarters. The 2nd Battalion The Rifles moved out to Thiepval Barracks in June 2014. In November 2016 the Ministry of Defence announced that the site would close in 2018, with only the "Training Area" (firing ranges) retained. Down GAA plans to build a centre of excellence at the former barracks.
