= Fair Credit Billing Act =

1974 United States federal legislation

The Fair Credit Billing Act (FCBA) is a United States federal law passed during the 93rd United States Congress and enacted on October 28, 1974, as an amendment to the Truth in Lending Act (codified at 15 U.S.C. § 1601 et seq.) and as the third title of the same bill signed into law by President Gerald Ford that also enacted the Equal Credit Opportunity Act. Its purpose is to protect consumers from unfair billing practices and to provide a mechanism for addressing billing errors in "open end" credit accounts, such as credit card or charge card accounts.

== Examples of billing errors ==
The following are examples of billing errors under the FCBA:

- Charges not actually made by the consumer
- Charges in the wrong amount.
- Charges for goods or services not received by the consumer
- Charges for goods not delivered as agreed
- Charges for goods that were damaged on delivery
- Failures to properly reflect payments or credits to an account
- Calculation errors
- Charges that the consumer wants clarified or requests proof of
- Statements mailed to the wrong address
- Significantly not as described product/goods

== Correction of billing errors ==
The FCBA allows consumers to dispute billing errors by sending a written notice of the dispute to the creditor. To trigger duties under the Act, a person must send a written dispute via mail to the "billing inquiries" address on their credit card statement, not the address for sending payments. This dispute must be received by the creditor within sixty days of the statement date on the account statement that first contained the billing error. Notice given by telephone is not sufficient to trigger the protections of the FCBA; a consumer can only protect their rights under the Act by sending a written notice, or online if the creditor indicates to consumers that it will accept notices electronically. Banks may accept disputes by phone while warning their customers that phone complaints do not preserve the customer's rights under the Act. This often leads to a chargeback to the vendor.

After receiving notice of a dispute, the credit issuer must acknowledge the dispute within thirty days, investigate the claim and, within ninety days, either make appropriate corrections to the account or send a letter to the consumer explaining why the creditor believes there was no error. If the creditor responds that they believe there was no error, the consumer can request copies of documentation supporting the validity of the disputed items.

== Other regulations of the FCBA ==
In addition to creating a mechanism for dealing with billing errors, the FCBA contains additional regulations, including the following:

- Billing statements must be sent at least fourteen days before the payment is due for open end credit accounts that have a grace period prior to adding finance charges.
- If banks report payments as delinquent to credit bureaus they must also report a charge is disputed.
- Credit card companies may not prohibit merchants from offering discounts to people who pay with cash or check.
- Banks may generally not use money in checking or savings accounts to pay a delinquent credit account with the same bank.
- The FCBA's § 170 gives a consumer the right to sue or assert defenses against the credit company (instead of the actual merchant) in a dispute about the quality of goods or services received, to the dollar extent of the amount of the charge(s) involved.(The dollar amount of the charge must exceed $50, and the purchase must have been made in the consumer's home state or within 100 miles of their address (unless the creditor is affiliated with the merchant, in which case these restrictions do not apply). The consumer must also make a good faith attempt to resolve the dispute prior to invoking this right.)

== Enforcement of the FCBA ==
The Federal Trade Commission is the "overall enforcing agency" for purposes of administrative enforcement, though compliance by banks is enforced under section 8 of the Federal Deposit Insurance Act.

A consumer may also file a private lawsuit in any state or federal court with jurisdiction over the parties to recover actual damages, statutory damages of double the erroneous finance charge(s), and his or her costs and attorney fees (if the claim is successful). If the alleged unlawful conduct is widespread, the consumer can also seek to file a class action suit and seek damages up to the lesser of $500,000 or 1 per centum of the net worth of the creditor.

== See also ==
- Fair Credit Reporting Act (FCRA)
- Fair Debt Collection Practices Act (FDCPA)
- Fair and Accurate Credit Transactions Act (FACTA) amended the FCRA
- 15 U.S.C. § 1643 (Liability of holder of credit card) which limits cardholder liability for unauthorized use of a credit card to $50
