= Ballykinler =

Village in County Down, Northern Ireland

Coordinates: 54.25°N 5.8°W

Ballykinlar: Irish: Baile Coinnleora
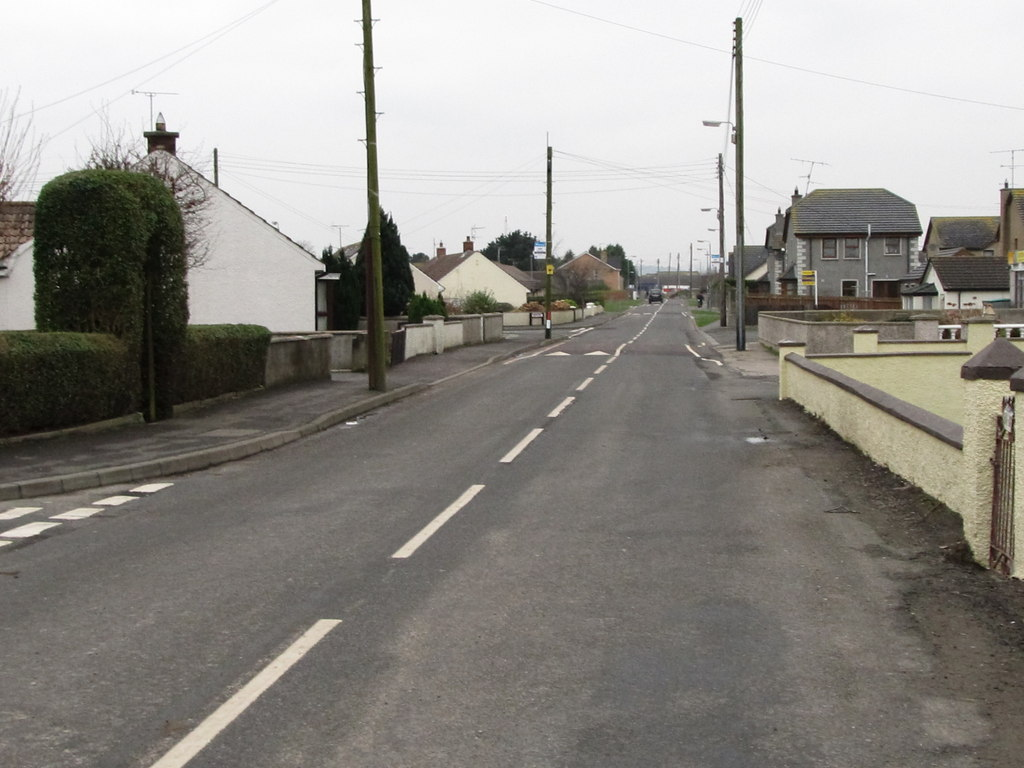
- Commons Road

- Location within County Down
- Population: 348 (2001 Census)
- District: Newry, Mourne and Down
- County: County Down
- Country: Northern Ireland
- Sovereign state: United Kingdom
- Post town: Downpatrick
- Postcode district: BT30
- Dialling code: 028

Ballykinler (Irish: Baile Coinnleora), often transcribed as Ballykinlar, is a village and civil parish in County Down, Northern Ireland. It lies 12 kilometres south west of Downpatrick, in the parish of Tyrella and Dundrum. In the 2001 census it had a population of 348 people. It is within the Newry, Mourne and Down area and runs parallel to the Irish Sea coast. Located within the Lecale Coast Area of Outstanding Natural Beauty, the village is surrounded by low drumlins and marshes. It is also the site of a former British Army base and internment camp known as Abercorn Barracks.

== Etymology ==
At the time of the conquest of Ulster by John de Courcy around 1177, Ballykinlar was called Lesscummalscig. The tithes from the area went to Christ Church, Dublin to pay for wax candles hence it became from Irish Baile Coinnleora 'townland of the candles'.

== Amenities ==
The village has a shop and filling station. Public houses in the area include The Four Roads Inn (2 miles from the village) and the Minerstown Tavern (3 miles to the east).

The preschool playgroup in the village has received some funding from the National Lottery.

Visitors to the area include walkers and hikers on the Ballykinlar to Killough walk which passes the Blue Flag beach at Tyrella. A nearby coastal path is maintained by the Ministry of Defence, although access is prohibited when shooting ranges are active.

== Transport ==
Ballykinlar Halt railway station was opened in March 1915, but closed on 16 January 1950.

A regular bus service runs between Downpatrick and Ballykinlar, via Clough.

== Sport ==
Ballykinlar has three sports pitches, including two changing facilities. It also has several association football teams.

The local Gaelic Athletic Association club, Ballykinlar GAA (Baile Choinnleora in Irish), was founded in 1932. The grounds for this Gaelic football club is named in memory of the Irish nationalist, trade unionist and journalist Tadhg Barry.

== Civil parish ==
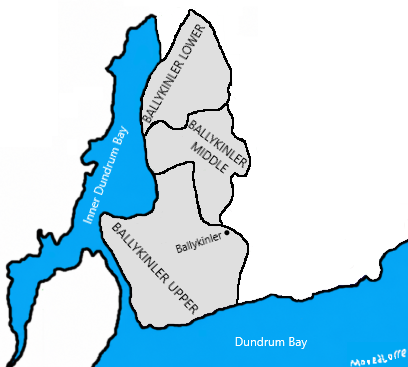
A map of Ballykinler civil parish

The civil parish is in the historic barony of Lecale Upper and contains the settlement of Ballykinler.

The civil parish also contains the townlands of Ballykinler Lower, Ballykinler Middle (which contains the subtownland of Inislochgullion), and Ballykinler Upper.

== See also ==
- List of villages in Northern Ireland
- List of civil parishes of County Down

== Bibliography ==
- Prisoners of War - Ballykinlar Internment Camp 1920-1921, Liam O'Duibhir 2013 ISBN 978 1 78117 0410
- The Ulster Defence Regiment: An Instrument of Peace?, Chris Ryder 1991 ISBN 0-413-64800-1
