= Ethiopian Golden Age of music =

Musical era of Ethiopia spanning from 1960s to 1970s

The Ethiopian Golden Age of Music was an era of Ethiopian music that began around the 1960s to 1970s, when there was widespread innovation in popular music, particularly the Ethio-jazz genre. Several artists and musical companies, as well as recording groups, emerged to produce their own singles and albums, the first ones being Amha Records, Philips Records, Ethiopia Records, and Kaifa Records, which is primarily based in Addis Ababa. Musicians Alemayehu Eshete, Tilahun Gessesse, Mahmoud Ahmed, Mulatu Astatke and others were prominent in this era.

This era lasted until the Derg came to power in 1974, and engaged in politically motivated persecutions and retributions against musicians and companies unless their output celebrated the ruling military regime. Many musicians responded with self-imposed exile to North America and Europe.

After the downfall of the Derg in the mid-1980s, the music industry revitalized. Starting in 1998, the Éthiopiques series of compilation CDs was released internationally and helped popularize Ethiopian music.

== Background ==
The earliest known introduction of Western music in Ethiopia dates back to 1923 when Kevork Nalbandian was hired by the Ethiopian government to organize the first Ethiopian military marching band, later known as the Ethiopian National Defence Force Band. The band quickly became popular across the country, prompting more bands to form, further expediting the combination of Western-style music with traditional Ethiopian instruments. With Ethiopia becoming increasingly modern under the reign of Emperor Haile Selassie from 1930 to 1974, media such as radio, television, and records were crucial in communicating Western music to the country. Jazz, blues, and funk records from America were popular due to their wide distribution and radio broadcasting stations limited listeners to only foreign or Ethiopian-Western hybrid music. This emphasis on Western music established the foundations for the Ethio-jazz genre of the Golden Age.

By 1948, all music production was restricted to being recorded at one government agency—Hager Fikir Theatre. This upset many Ethiopians since the government was legally allowed to exile anyone who attempted to record their own music.

== Ethio-jazz ==
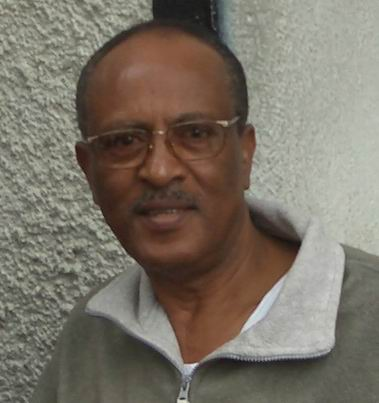
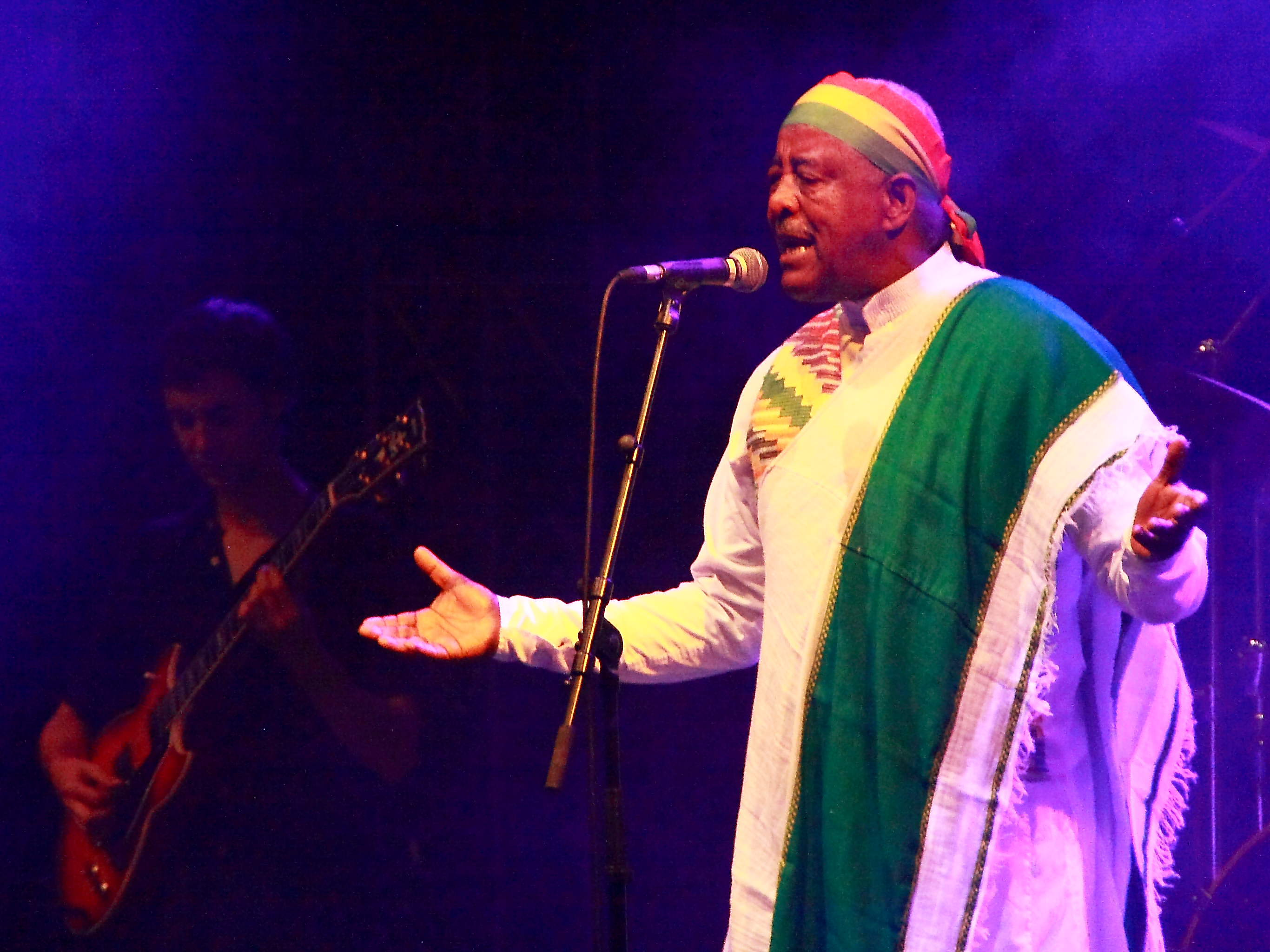
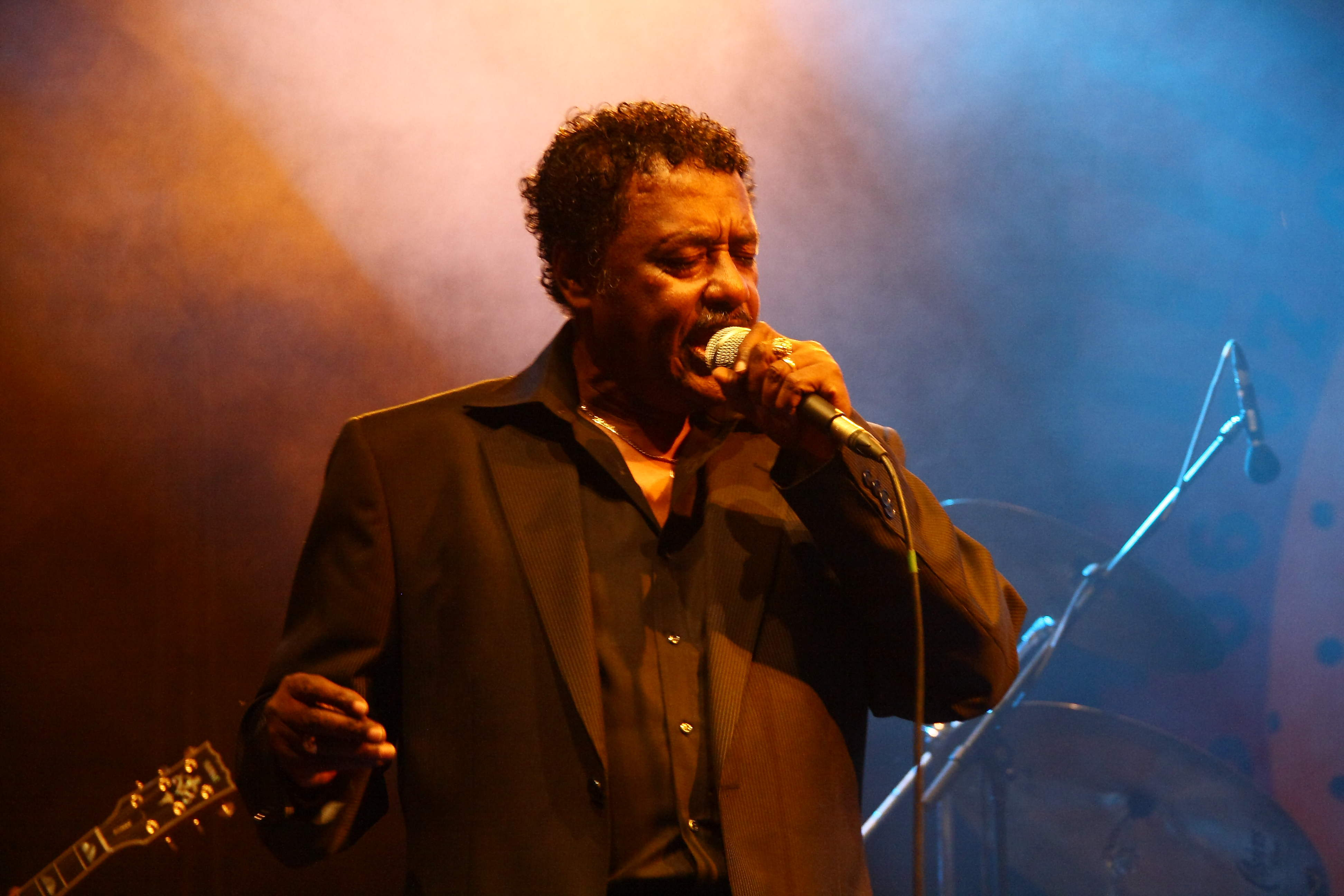
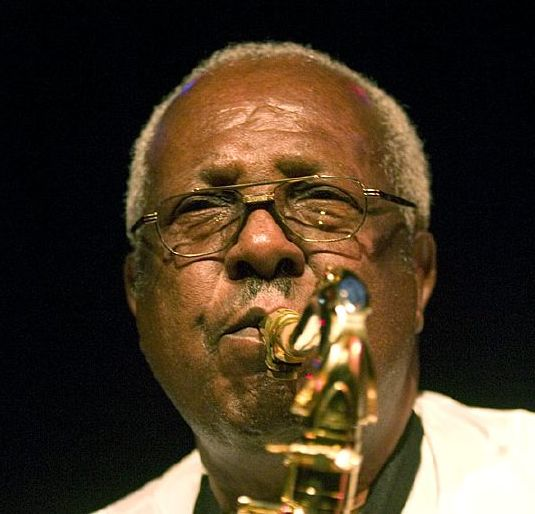
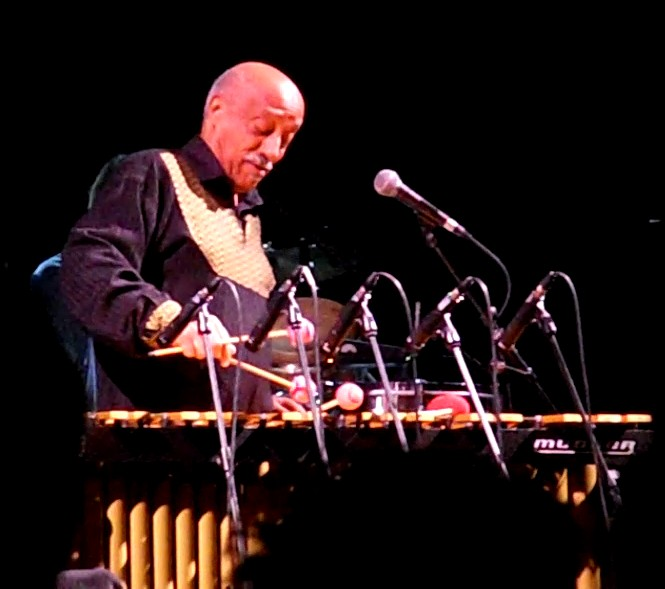
Golden Age era musicians: from left to right, Tilahun Gessesse, Mahmoud Ahmed, Alemayehu Eshete, Getatchew Mekurya and Mulatu Astatke

Ethiopian jazz is a fusion of traditional Ethiopian rhythms and harmonies with the techniques and instruments of Western jazz. One of the key figures in the development of Ethiopian Jazz was Mulatu Astatke. As a teenager, Mulatu was able to leave Addis Ababa in 1959 to study music at the Trinity College of Music in London. There he received training on how to use Western instruments such as the piano and clarinet. After London, he moved to New York to pursue his passion of jazz and Latin pop. However, Mulatu soon returned to his home country in 1969 to discover the upswing of Addis Ababa's Golden Age of Music. Using the five-note pentatonic scale and asymmetrical rhythm from Tizita Qenet and his technical skills from New York, allowed him to create a unique sound he called "Ethio-Jazz". Although Western music was not new to the country, Mulatu met some set-back against his creation as there was still a strong traditional mindset in Ethiopia. Beginning in 1960, a growing number of people began to feel as though Western traditions were contaminating the national identity of Ethiopians. These groups opposed Mulatu's radical style of music that used his 'signature vibraphone' and conga's which contrasted the traditional Masenqo and Washint of Ethiopia. Still, with the help of Amha Eshete, Mulatu was able to gain popularity and release many records of his new sound.

In the span of 6 years, Amha Records recorded over 103 singles from Ethio-Jazz artists with Mulatu as lead producer. These records are known as Éthiopiques—a collection of discs later discovered and re-released by French producer Francis Falceto in the 1990s. Ethiopiques used such styles which borne numerous prominent artists of the time including Tilahun Gessesse, Alemayehu Eshete, Hailu Mergia, and among others. Ethio-jazz clubs and bands became very popular across the country. The Walias Band was formed in 1960 and was led by Hailu Mergia. The band would frequently play at hotels and clubs non-stop due to the high demand for jazz bands.

=== Ethio-Jazz in America ===
Mulatu's first Ethio-Jazz album Afro-Latin Soul 1 & 2 was released in 1966 with his Ethiopian Quartet. His Ethiopian Quartet were actually predominately Puerto Ricans under the small New York Label Worthy. By 1972, he released another album Mulatu of Ethiopia, further establishing the connection between the States and Ethiopia. After the coupe of Haile Selassie and the rise of the Derg in 1974, the exciting Addis Ababa city life was put on curfew and most music was censored or limited to patriotic songs. It became more difficult for Ethio-Jazz artists to continue on in Ethiopia, leaving them to flee to the country or stop making music.

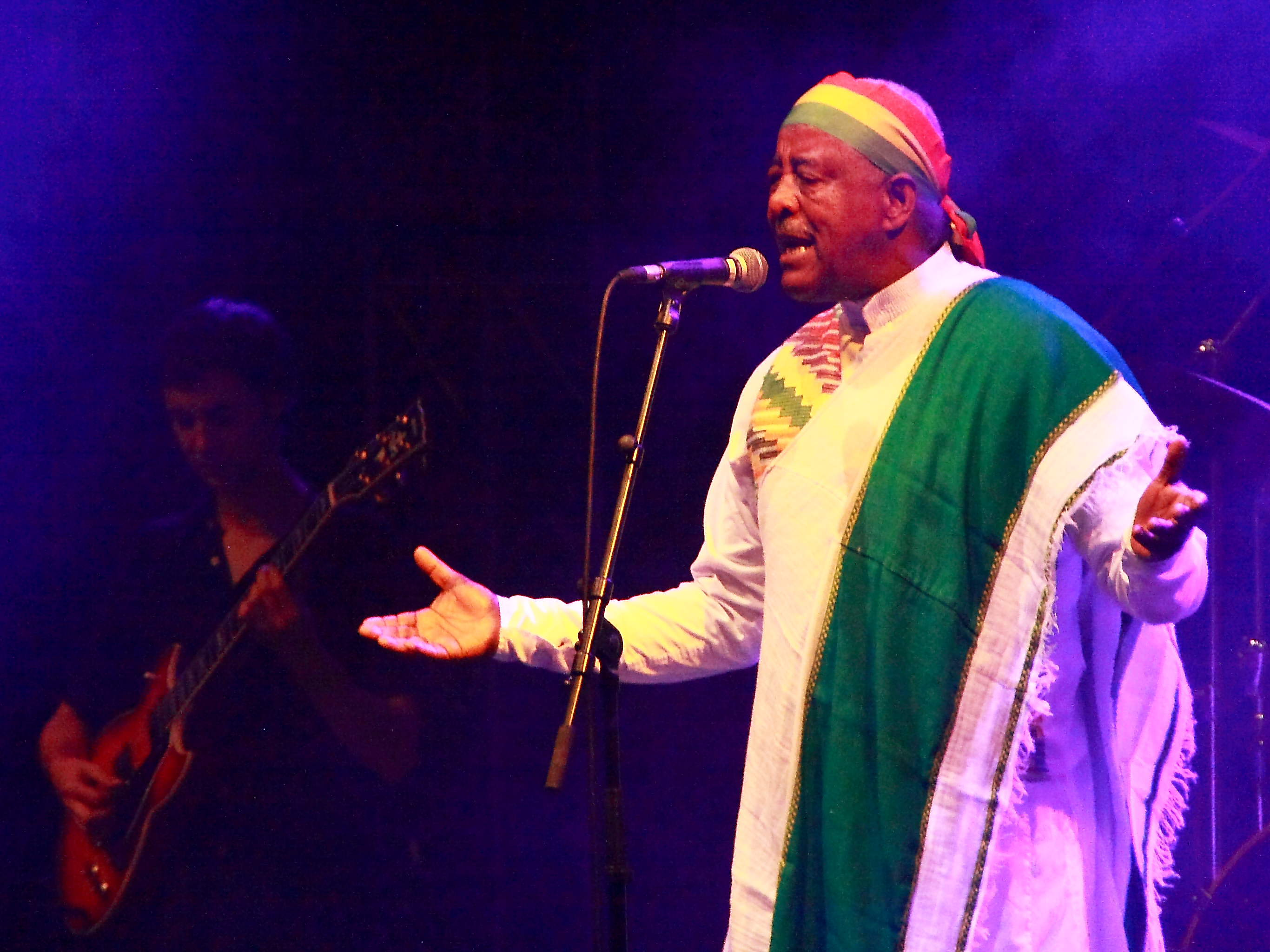
Mahmoud Ahmed performing in 2010

However, due to Ethio-Jazz being primarily instrumental, many bands could technically continue to make music under the Derg. Authorities allowed Mulatu and his band to continue performing at official ceremonies and The Walias released their first album Tezeta in 1975. Although, Mulatu states in an interview "[making music] wasn't like before" the Derg.

While Mulatu stayed in Ethiopia, The Walias (along with Mahmoud Ahmed) were able to travel to the US in 1981 due to their great popularity. Instead of returning to Ethiopia's oppressive regime, Hailu and three other members decided to stay in Washington D.C. where they continued playing as The Zula Band. Hailu and his band went largely unnoticed outside of the Ethiopian diaspora community in D.C. until Awesome Tapes From Africa, a label that released old African cassettes, tracked Hailu down and began re-releasing his music for the first time to a new audience. Since 2013, Hailu Mergia's music is receiving international recognition.

Others such as Mahmoud Ahmed who made appearance at Carnegie Hall and Girma Beyene who took CUNY's Graduate Center. Many musicians associated their release to North America such as major bands like Ras Band, All Star Band, Zula Band, Venus Band, Wabe Shebele Band, Roha Band and Dahlak Band, and Samuel Yirga which released his debut album Guzo. Many musicians associated their release to North America such as major bands like Ras Band, All Star Band, Zula Band, Venus Band, Wabe Shebele Band, Roha Band and Dahlak Band, and Samuel Yirga which released his debut album Guzo.

== Downfall of the Golden Age ==
By the mid-1970s, the Derg—led by Mengistu Haile Mariam—overthrew the monarchy of Ethiopia. Under the dictatorship, music that did not uplift the Derg was prohibited and a strict mandatory curfew was placed—consequently diminishing the nightlife and music scene in Ethiopia. Besides The Walias who were able to tour, many Ethiopian artists stayed within the country since emigration became very difficult. During the next decade, Ethiopian citizens faced many hardships such as the Red Terror (Ethiopia) from 1975 to 1977, and a widespread famine from 1983 to 1985. The consecutive disastrous events in the country led many to long for times before dictatorship.

Girum Merasha, a resident of Piazza in the center of Addis Ababa described fans reaction "I think the closing of music shops takes away something great from Addis Ababa, not just Piassa." The main problem in this period was the closure of music recording companies that weakened the album production and distribution. In the past three decades, 25 albums used to be released, the number now less than 10 annually. Sabisa Film Production manager Sewmehon Yismaw told EBR, "Instead, artists are choosing to reach more people with less expense way by singles. It’s easier to make a career like that because it is expensive and difficult to produce an album in the absence of music companies. Even if the artists managed to produce his own album, due to copyright related problems, he could not refund his investment." Sewmehon added the problem of music industry when distribution consisted of analogue formats like cassette tapes, copyright issues was highly prevalent. Even the introduction of CDs more simplified the copyright infringement.

Francis Falceto, the curator of Buda Musique complained that the current music scene in Ethiopia's "lost generation" with much production was diminishing time by time. In 1998, Ethiopiques reestablished its existence bringing long-term collaboration with musicians like Mahmoud Ahmed, Mulatu Astatke and Tilahun Gessesse to musical scene.

=== Wax and Gold ===
This longing led to the end of the Golden Age and the beginning of a new era of art in Ethiopia. 'Wax and Gold'--popularized in 1985 by Neway Debebe—is a traditional Ethiopian double entendre. It is an analogy to literal wax and gold—where the 'wax' is the superficial layer that covers the hidden 'gold' underneath. Through this form of artistic communication, artists were able to escape the heavy censorships emplaced under Mengistu. Thus, artists were able to have multiple meanings in their music. Tizita (also spelled Tezeta), the most popular style of music in Ethiopia, translates closely to nostalgia or the 'Song of Longing'. With the Wax and Gold strategy, artists were able to connote their longing for a loved one to the nostalgia of Ethiopia's past or culture.

The sound of the music itself did not necessarily change, as artists of the time were heavily influenced by their Ethio-Jazz veterans. Popular artists that used 'Wax and Gold' are Aster Aweke, who recorded multiple versions of 'Tizita'. As well as Neway Debebe, Netsanet Mellesse, and Ephram Tamru.

== List of prominent figures ==
=== Musicians ===
- Mahmoud Ahmed
- Tilahun Gessesse
- Alemayehu Eshete
- Bizunesh Bekele
- Hirut Bekele
- Mulatu Astatke
- Girma Beyene
- Getatchew Mekurya
- Teshome Mitiku
- Theodros Mitiku
- Menelik Wossenachew
- Getachew Hailu
- Neway Debebe
- Muluken Melesse
- Hailu Mergia

=== Bands ===
- Walias Band
- Roha Band
- Debo Band
- Dahlak Band
- Buda Musique

=== Record labels ===
- Philips Records
- Kaifa Records
- Ethiopia Records

=== Compilations ===
- Éthiopiques
