= List of musicians using Amharic vocals =

The following is an alphabetical list of notable musicians using Amharic vocals in their musical compositions. The Amharic language is predominantly used in Ethiopia.

== List of musicians ==
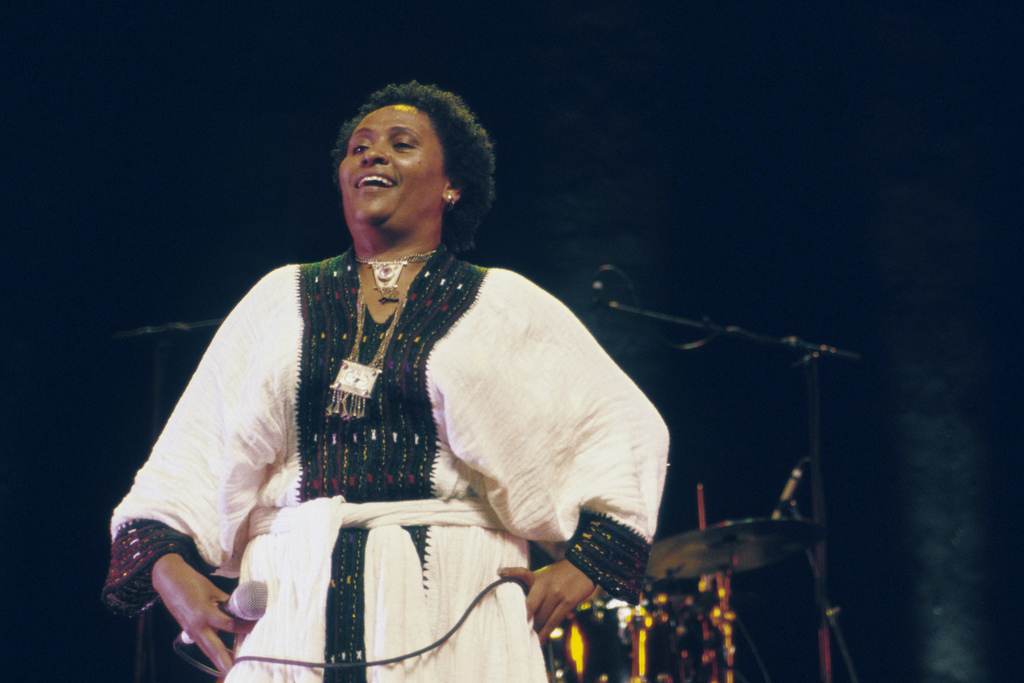
Eténèsh Wassié

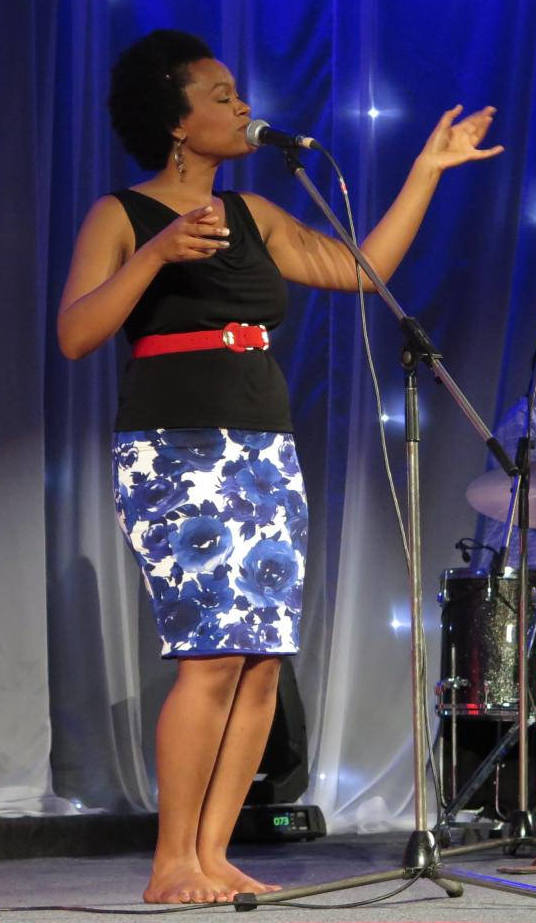
Meklit Hadero

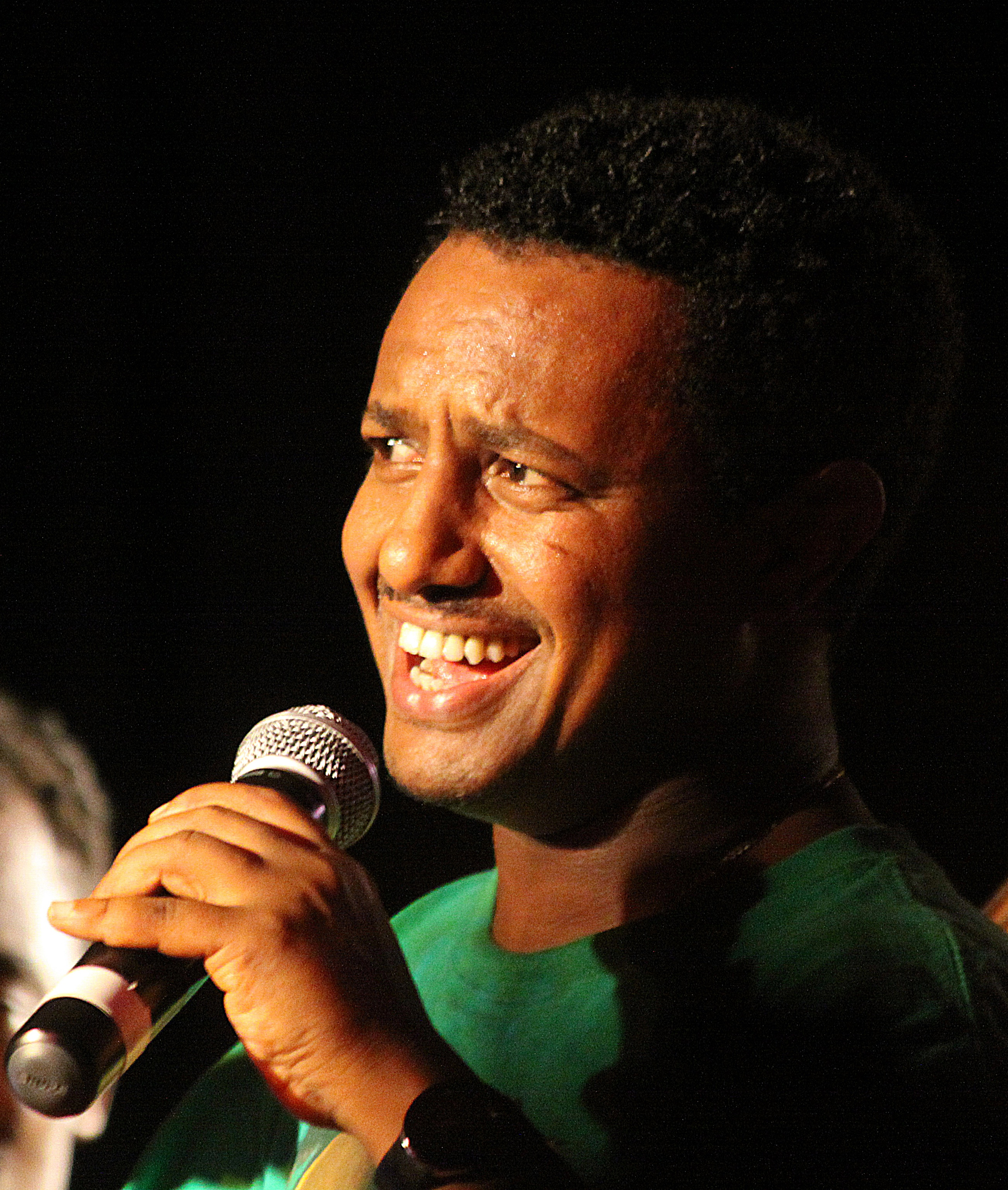
Teddy Afro

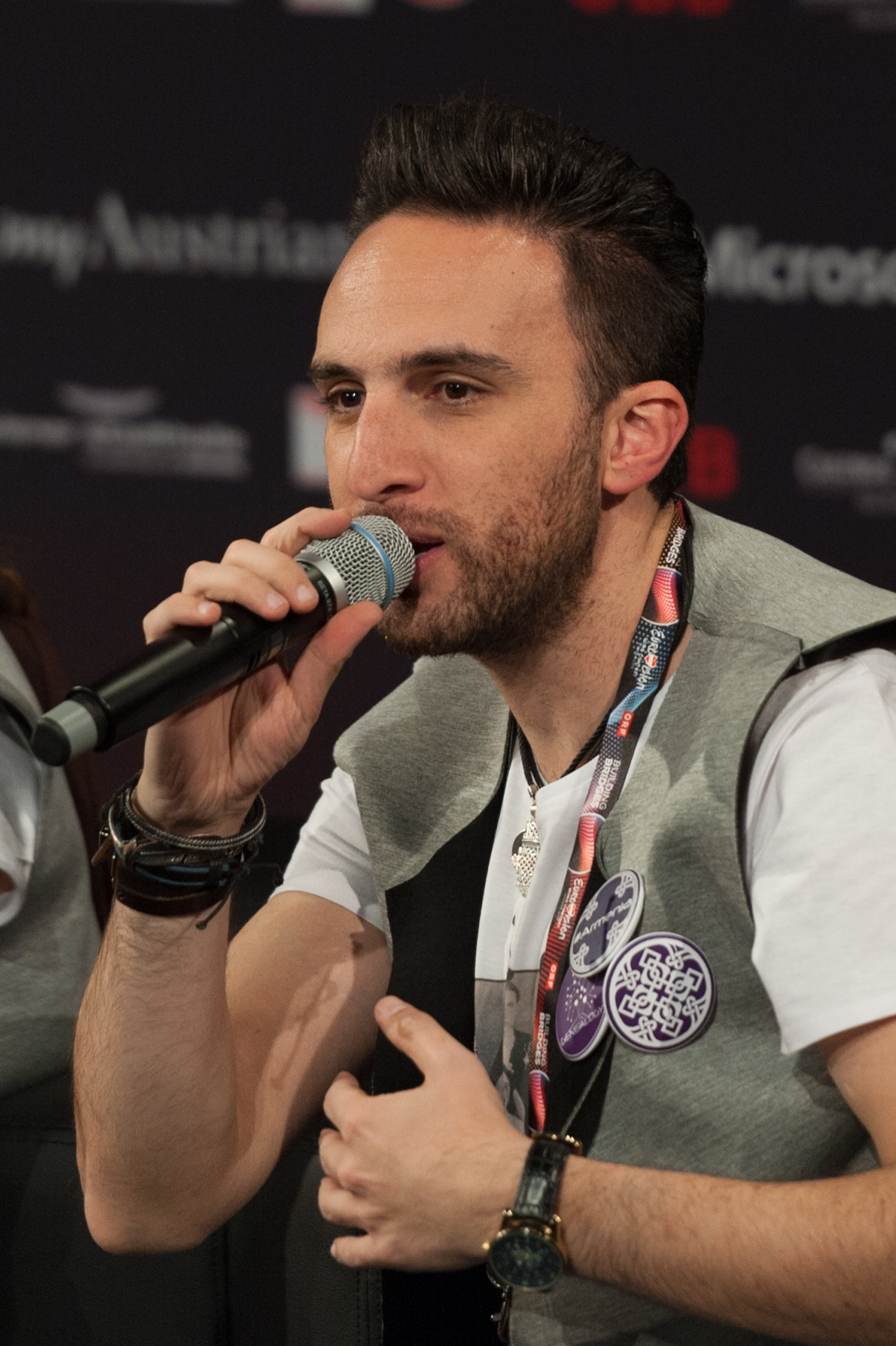
Vahe Tilbian

=== A ===
- Abatte Barihun
- Abby Lakew
- Alemayehu Eshete
- Alemu Aga
- Amsal Mitike
- Ashenafi Kebede
- Asnaketch Worku
- Aster Aweke

=== B ===
- Bahru Kegne
- Berhana
- Betty G
- Bizunesh Bekele

=== E ===
- Eténèsh Wassié
- Eden Alene

=== G ===
- Gigi

=== H ===
- Hagit Yaso
- Hirut Bekele

=== J ===
- Jeremy Cool Habash
- Jonny Ragga

=== K ===
- Kuku Sebsebe

=== M ===
- Mahmoud Ahmed
- Meklit Hadero
- Menelik Wossenachew
- Minyeshu
- Muluken Melesse
- Munit Mesfin

=== N ===
- Neway Debebe

=== T ===
- Tamrat Desta
- Teddy Afro
- Telela Kebede
- Tessema Eshete
- The Weeknd
- Tigist Shibabaw
- Tilahun Gessesse
- Tsedenia Gebremarkos

=== V ===
- Vahe Tilbian

=== Z ===
- Zeritu Kebede
