= Getachew Kassa =

Ethiopian singer and percussionist (1944–2024)

Getachew Kassa ጌታቸው ካሳ

Background information
- Born: 6 September 1944; Addis Ababa, British-occupied Ethiopia
- Died: 21 February 2024 (aged 79) Addis Ababa, Ethiopia
- Genres: Ethio-jazz
- Occupations: Singer; musician
- Instruments: Accordion; saxophone; vocals
- Years active: 1960s–2024
- Labels: Amha Records; Kaifa Records; Philips Records

Getachew Kassa (Amharic: ጌታቸው ካሳ; 6 September 1944 – 21 February 2024) was an Ethiopian jazz singer and percussionist. He rose to famous during the 1960s and 1970s, after performing at the country's famous clubs, the Sombrino and Axum Hall. His music features in the Éthiopiques album series, alongside other musicians of the Ethiopian Golden Age.

== Early life ==
Getachew Kassa was born in Addis Ababa, Ethiopian Empire on 6 September 1944. He began singing at the age of six, despite being discouraged by his parents. His early influences included Elvis Presley, Harry Belafonte and popular Italian songs. He occasionally started to sing for his friends and at home.. He adopted his stage name, “Kassa,” inspired by a suggestion from a friend.

== Career ==
As a young man, he started playing with a band called Fetan Band – or Speed Band – at the Patrice Lumumba Bar in Wube Berha in the 1970s. Getachew established himself as one of the most accomplished Ethiopian musicians of the period. Notable songs include "Addis Ababa", "Tiz Balegn Gize", "Yekereme Fikir", "Bertucan nesh lomi" "Bichayan Tekze" "Agere Tizitash". He played for various groups, such as the Sehebelles, the Venus Band, and later with the Walias Band, alongside Hailu Mergia and Girma Bèyènè. His songs "Tezata - Slow" and "Tezeta - Fast" were featured on the album Éthiopiques, Vol. 10: Ethiopian Blues & Ballads. Getachew was hired to play the accordion for 15 birr a night at The Sombrino club, a popular venue in the 1960s and 1970s. While working there, he met the prominent singer Alemayehu Eshete and performed many of his singles. Subsequently, he moved to another famous club called Axum Hall, playing for Venus Club and Taytu Hotel, thereafter quickly rose to fame, in part due to his fast and slow tezeta songs.

Getachew moved to the United States in 1981, and lived there for many years. In the mid-1980s, he toured through country and drew attention to the fate of the people who had been struck by the famine in Ethiopia. After publishing his first CD in 1983, he briefly returned to Ethiopia, before again living in the U.S. from 1991. His self-image as a "world citizen" brought him the status of an illegal immigrant. He returned to live in Ethiopia in 2012.

In 2000, Ethio-Sound released an album The Best of Getachew Kassa, a 12 track CD of his greatest works throughout his career. Getachew was a part of the Stay Strong Project's Stay Strong Orchestra alongside Alemayehu Eshete and a songwriter and singer.

== Death ==
Getachew died in Addis Ababa on 21 February 2024, at the age of 79 after battling a long illness. He was hospitalized at Yekatit 12 Hospital. A funeral was scheduled for the following day and his body was cremated at Holy Trinity Cathedral in Addis Ababa.

== Discography ==
Singles and EPs
| Title | Year | Label |
|---|---|---|
| 'Bichayene Tekezie" | 1970 | Amha Records |
| "Tizita" | 1972 | Amha Records |
| "Yene Alem"/'Wededkuh Maletish Layker" | 1974 | Philips Records |
| 'Birtukan Wey Lomi"/"Gofere Hugnilign" | 1975 | Philips Records |
| "Endihim Endihim" | 1976 | Kaifa Records |

Compilations
| Title | Year | Label |
|---|---|---|
| The Best Of | 2000 | Ethio-Sound |
