= Theodros Mitiku =

Ethiopian musician

- Died: 22 December 2013; Washington D.C., U.S.
- Genres: Ethio-jazz; instrumental
- Occupations: Musician; saxophonist
- Instrument: Saxophone
- Years active: 1960s–2013
- Labels: Ambassel; Nahom Records; AIT Records
- Formerly of: Soul Ekos Band; Ibex Band; Menelik Band

Theodros Mitiku (Amharic: ቴዎድሮስ ምትኩ; died 22 December 2013), also known as Teddy Mitiku, was an Ethiopian musician and saxophonist who was the brother of renowned Ethiopian musician Teshome Mitiku, and a member of Souk Ekos Band, which was active in the 1960s. He had worked with numerous bands and artists in the 1960s and 1970s, including the Ibex Band, Menelik Band, Mahmoud Ahmed, Tilahun Gessesse and Mulatu Astatke. He mostly worked with Ambassel Records, while AIT Records was a secondary record label.

== Career ==
Theodros Mitiku was the brother of renowned Ethiopian saxophonist Teshome Mitiku and a member of Soul Ekos Band, the first independent musical ensemble that recorded in Ethiopia, as well as Ibex and Menelik Bands. He also supported other bands of the 1960s and 1970s during the golden era of Ethiopian music, and artists such as Tilahun Gessesse and Mulatu Astatke. In the Ibex Band, he was half of the group's two-saxophone horn section on the Mahmoud Ahmed hit "Era Mela Mela". From that time, he collaborated with his brother Teshome, performing on solo albums and performances.

== Death ==
Theodros died while receiving medical treatment on 22 December 2013, and his funeral service was held at Debre Kidist Mariam Church in Washington, D.C. He was laid to rest at Gate of Heaven Cemetery in Silver Spring, Maryland, on 28 December. At the time of his death, he was survived by his wife of 22 years, Meaza Bezu, a daughter, Makeda, his brother Teshome, and his sister Kedist.

== Discography ==
Albums
Title	Year	Label
Instrumental Music No.1	1993	Ambassel
Teddy's Mood	1998	AIT Records
Hsabe	1998	Nahom Records
Fikir Ayaregim	2016	
Instrumental Music No. 2	–	Ambassel
