= The Rough Guide to the Music of Ethiopia (2004 album) =

Compilation album by Various artists
- Released: 24 February 2004
- Genre: World, Ethiopian
- Length: 74:28
- Label: World Music Network

Full series chronology
The Rough Guide to Brazilian Electronica (2003)	The Rough Guide to the Music of Ethiopia (2004)	The Rough Guide to the Music of Canada (2003)

The Rough Guide to the Music of Ethiopia is a world music compilation album originally released in 2004. Part of the World Music Network Rough Guides series, the release covers the music of Ethiopia, focusing largely on 1960s pop. The compilation was curated by Francis Falceto, who also produces Buda Musique's Éthiopiques series. Phil Stanton, co-founder of the World Music Network, was the producer.

This album was followed by a second volume, focusing on music of the early 21st Century, in 2012.

== Critical reception ==
Professional ratings
Review scores
Source	Rating
Robert Christgau	A-
AllMusic	3/5 stars

The compilation's release was met with generally positive reviews. Robert Christgau compared it with Éthiopiques (which had reached eighteen volumes by 2004), calling the recording "peaky" & "fluent". Writing for AllMusic, Adam Greenberg described it as an "outstanding album" portraying an "entirely unique" sound.

== Track listing ==
No.	Title	Artist	Length
1.	"Addis Ababa Bété"	Alemayehu Eshete	5:52
2.	"Ené Nègn Bay Manèsh"	Girma Bèyènè	4:01
3.	"Altchalkum"	Moges Habte	6:17
4.	"Dodge"	Netsanet Mellesse	5:39
5.	"Muziqawi Silt"	Walias Band	3:44
6.	"Tchèwata"	Fanaye Tesfaye	6:02
7.	"Selé Senè Seqlèt"	Alèmu Aga	3:58
8.	"Y'shebellu"	Aster Aweke	7:27
9.	"Antchi Hoyé Lèné"	Yared Tefera	5:59
10.	"Alegntayé"	Tlahoun Gèssèssè	4:38
11.	"Bèmen Sèbèb Letlash"	Mahmoud Ahmed	4:33
12.	"Hasabé"	Tèshomé Meteku	3:56
13.	"Sabyé"	Mulatu Astatke	5:27
14.	"Eté Endénèsh Gèdawo"	Muluken Melesse	4:15
15.	"Medley"	Adanèh Tèka	2:40
