= Walias Band =

Ethiopian jazz and funk band

- Also known as: Wallias Band; The Walias
- Origin: Addis Ababa, Ethiopia
- Genres: Ethiopian music, funk
- Years active: Early 1970s–1990s
- Labels: Amha Records, Kaifa Records. Buda Musique
- Spinoff of: Venus Band
- Past members: Mahmoud Aman; Melake Gebre; Hailu Mergia; Girma Beyene; Temare Haragy; Yohannes Tekola; Tilaye Gebre; Mulatu Astatke

Walias Band (sometimes spelled Wallias Band; Amharic: ዋሊያስ ባንድ) were an Ethiopian jazz and funk band active from the early 1970s until the early 1990s. Formed by members of the Venus Band, Walias backed up many prominent singers with a hard polyrhythmic funk sound influenced by western artists like King Curtis, Junior Walker and Maceo Parker. In 1977 they recorded one of the few albums of Ethiopian instrumental music in collaboration with vibraphonist Mulatu Astatke, whose role as a bandleader and composer was also a major influence on Ethiopian popular music.

== History ==
Walias formed in the early 1970s in Addis Ababa, where they were the house band for the upscale Hilton Hotel. A civilian curfew made it dangerous for clientele visiting the hotel lounge to leave after 11:00 PM, and Walias would end up playing two or three sets until 6:00 AM the next day. The group's first album, Tezeta, was released in 1975 on their own Ethio Sound label. In 1981 Walias became the first modern Ethiopian band to travel to the United States, playing on a tour with singer Mahmoud Ahmed primarily to audiences of Ethiopian refugees. Rather than returning to Ethiopia under its dictatorship, four members of Walias—Girma Bèyènè, Mogès Habté, Mèlakè Gèbrè and Hailu Mergia—stayed in the U.S. and formed a new group called Zula Band. Mergia took work in Washington DC driving a taxi cab, often practicing in his cab while waiting for fares at the airport, and released solo cassette tapes of traditional Ethiopian music played on analog synthesizer, electric piano and accordion. Meanwhile, the members of Walias who returned to Ethiopia—Yohannes Tèkola and Tèmarè Harègou—continued to play together under the Derg dictatorship for another decade.

In the late 1990s Walias Band found a wider audience in the west when the French label Buda Records reissued much of the group's music on the Ethiopiques series of compact discs. Their instrumental "Musicawi Silt" became a popular dance number and has been covered by a number of artists. Not much else of Walias' music was known in the West until African music cassette collector Brian Shimkovitz found a Walias Band tape while traveling in Ethiopia. After hearing it, Shimkovitz found keyboardist Hailu Mergia's phone number on the Internet, called him up, and arranged an official re-release of Walias Band's music.

== Name ==
The Walias Band's name derives from the walia ibex, an endangered species of the Capra genus native to the mountains of Ethiopia. They share no members with the similarly named Ibex Band who also backed up Mahmoud Ahmed during the same epoch.

== Members ==
- Girma Beyene: Piano, electric piano, arranger
- Hailu Mergia: Organ, Moog synthesizer
- Mahmoud Aman: Guitar
- Melake Gebre: Bass
- Temare Haragy: Drums, percussion
- Yohanese Tekola: Trumpet
- Tilaye Gebre: Tenor saxophone

Mulatu Astatke played vibraphone on Walias Band's 1977 album Tche Belew.

Vocalists that Walias worked with included Getachew Kassa, Mahmoud Ahmed, Woubishet Fisseha, Alemayehu Borobor, Seyoum Gebreyes, Netsanet Mellessè and Tilahun Gessesse.

== Selected discography ==
Albums

- Alemayemu Borobor and the Walias "Tez Aleng Hagere" 45 (Kaifa Records)
- Hailu Mergia and the Walias Band Tezeta LP (1975, Ethio Sound Records, reissued 2021 by Awesome Tapes From Africa)
- Hailu Mergia and the Walias Tche Belew LP (1977, Kaifa Records; reissued on LP/CD/MP3 in 2014 by Awesome Tapes From Africa)
- Tilahun Gessesse and Walias Band cassette (1980–81, Misratch Music; reissued on LP in 2011 by Pstchic Sounds)
- Walias Band The Best of Walias LP (1981, Walias Records)
- Alemayehu Eshete & The Wallias Band Addis Ababa CD (1992, Musidisc)

Contributing artist

- The Rough Guide to the Music of Ethiopia (2004, World Music Network)

== Cover versions ==
- Moges Habte & Ethio Jazz Group "Musicawe Silt" (1994)
- The Daktaris "Musicawa Silt" on Soul Explosion (Desco 1998)
- Antibalas Afrobeat Orchestra "Musicawi Silt" on Liberation Afro Beat, Vol. 1 (2000)
- Secret Chiefs 3 "Musicawi Silt" (as "Safina") on Book M (2001)
- Either/Orchestra "Musicawi Silt" on "More Beautiful Than Death" (2000) and Éthiopiques Vol. 20: Live in Addis (2005)
- Getatchew Mekuria and The Ex "Musicawi Silt" on Moa Anbessa (2006)
- Zea "Muziqawi selt" (2007)
- Le Tigre (des Platanes) & Eténèsh Wassié'"Muziqawi Silt" (2008)
- Debo Band "Musicawi Silt" on Flamingoh (Pink Bird Dawn) (2010)
- Akalé Wubé "Muziqawi Silt" (2011)
- Rattlemouth "Muziqawi Silt" (2011)
