= Francis Falceto =

French musicologist and music producer

Francis Falceto is a contemporary French musicologist and music producer, specialising in World music and in particular music of Ethiopia which he helped propagate internationally from 1986 onwards.

== Biography ==
Francis Falceto programmed different world music at the Confort Moderne of Poitiers when in 1984 he discovered a Mahmoud Ahmed LP record, via Bernard Gallodé. In 1985, he decided to undertake a trip to Ethiopia (via Moscow because of the Derg regime) in order to meet Mahmoud Ahmed, then in 1986 again to reissue Mahmoud's Ethio-jazz album Erè Mèla Mèla (1975) on the Brussels-based Crammed Discs label. After the success of the record in Europe and in the United States, he decided in 1996 to create the Éthiopiques series with publisher Buda Musique in order to reissue Ethiopian music of the period 1950–1975, most of them produced by Amha Eshèté for the label Amha Records and Ali Abdella Kaifa for Kaifa Records of which he acquired the full rights, which was not without creating tensions with certain artists, including Mulatu Astatke (The king of sax shining on the world stage in Ethiopian Reporter 28 January 2012). After the important international success of the series, he also conducted numerous lectures on the subject.

Francis Falceto also proposed Lili Boniche to realize a return on stage in the early 1990s and became his impresario.

== Prizes and distinctions ==
- 2008: World Music Award of the BBC.
- 2011: Professional Excellence of the WOMEX Awards.

== Works ==
- (en/fr) Abyssinie Swing: A Pictorial History of Modern Ethiopian Music - Images de la musique éthiopienne moderne, Francis Falceto, éditions Shama Books, 2001 ISBN 978-1-931253-09-3. (in English and French)
- Les Nuits d'Addis-Abeba, Sebhat Gebre-Egziabher transl. Francis Falceto, Actes Sud, 2004 ISBN 978-2-7427-4907-2.
