= Teshome Mitiku =

Ethiopian singer and saxophonist (born 1949)

Teshome Mitiku ተሾመ ምትኩ
- Born: 1949 (age 76–77); Addis Ababa, Ethiopian Empire
- Origin: Ethiopia
- Genres: Ethio-jazz; world music
- Instruments: Saxophone; vocals
- Years active: 1960s–present
- Labels: Buda Musique; Alula Records
- Formerly of: Soul Ekos Band

Teshome Mitiku (Amharic: ተሾመ ምትኩ; born 1949) is an Ethiopian singer and saxophonist. He is the father of Swedish singer Emilia and brother of saxophonist Theodros Mitiku. He was leader of Soul Ekos Band active in 1960s.

== Early life ==
Teshome Mitiku was born in Addis Ababa in 1949. He is the brother of saxophonist Theodros Mitiku and father of Swedish pop and soul singer Emilia. In 1970, he moved to Europe. He initially lived in Denmark and later moved to Sweden where he received a degree in clinical psychology. Teshome currently resides in Washington, D.C.

== Career ==
Teshome started his career in the 1960s during the country's musical Golden Age, accompanied by his appearance in the Either/Orchestra at Chicago Jazz Festival in September. He was a leader of Soul Ekos Band, the first independent musical ensemble recorded in the country. During his stay in the group, he released hits like "Gara Sir New Betesh", "Yezemed Yebada", "Mot Adeladlogn" and "Hasabe", all written by him.

Before settling in the United States in the 1990s, Teshome spent over 20 years in Sweden pursuing a musical career, earning a degree, and supporting his daughter to become a singer.

== Discography ==
Singles and EPs
Title	Year	Label
"Gara Sir Betesh"/"Meche Derische"	1969	Amha Records
"Mote Adeladayou"	1969	Amha Records
"Hasabe"/"Yezemed Yebada"	1969	Amha Records
"Assiyo Belema"	2016	Mr Bongo

Albums
Title	Year	Label
Topia's Deluge	2006	Alula Records
Zemen	2008	Nahom Records
