= The Rough Guide to the Music of Ethiopia (2012 album) =

Compilation album by Various artists
- Released: 25 September 2012
- Genre: World, Ethiopian
- Length: 117:05
- Label: World Music Network

Full series chronology
The Rough Guide to the Music of China (2012)	The Rough Guide to the Music of Ethiopia (2012)	The Rough Guide to Salsa (2012)

The Rough Guide to the Music of Ethiopia is a world music compilation album originally released in 2012. Part of the World Music Network Rough Guides series, the release contains two discs: an overview of the music of Ethiopia—focusing mainly on 21st century pop—is found on Disc One, while Disc Two features dub-style musician Invisible System. The compilation was curated by Dominic Raymond-Barker and Phil Stanton, co-founder of the World Music Network, who was also the producer. It is the second compilation by this name: the first volume, focusing on music of the 1960s, was released in 2004.

== Critical reception ==
Professional ratings
Review scores
Source	Rating
Robert Christgau	A-
AllMusic	4/5 stars
PopMatters	7/10 stars
The Independent	4/5 stars

The compilation's release was met with positive reviews, with Robert Christgau including it in his top albums of 2012. Writing for AllMusic, Chris Nickson described it as an "indispensable primer" and "a real winner". Both Christgau and Deanne Sole of PopMatters compared the album with Buda Musique's Éthiopiques series (which had reached 27 volumes by 2012), with Sole discussing its role in creating the sense of age now attributed by Western world music listeners to Ethiopian music (which she calls "uncanny"), and how most tracks on the Rough Guide album are in fact by the Ethiopian diaspora and foreigners. Howard Male of The Independent said the album is one of the occasional Rough Guide compilations to "hit the bull's eye" and called Disc Two's Invisible System "arguably the most experimental Ethio-fusion project of them all." This disc was the focus of BBC Music's review, where Robin Denselow called the tracks "boldly unusual" and "impressively original stuff".

== Track listing ==
=== Disc One ===
No.	Title	Artist	Length
1.	"Ametballe"	Bole 2 Harlem	4:57
2.	"Guragigna"	Dub Colossus	5:13
3.	"Ohoho Gedama"	Mahmoud Ahmed	4:46
4.	"Musicawi Silt"	The Ex and Guests & Getatchew Mekurya	4:22
5.	"Datchene Koba (Trio Of Emblitas)"	Orchestra Ethiopia	2:25
6.	"Ende Eyerusalem"	Krar Collective	7:22
7.	"Abet Abet [Punt Mix]"	Samuel Yirga	5:11
8.	"Sek'let (Crucifixion)"	Zerfu Demissie	3:22
9.	"Ambassel"	Invisible System	5:29
10.	"Ney-Ney Weleba"	Alemayehu Eshete	3:46
11.	"Gue"	Tirudel Zenebe	7:19
12.	"Mela Mela"	Mohammed 'Jimmy' Mohammed	4:49
13.	"Homesickness"	Tsegué-Maryam Guèbrou	3:51

=== Disc Two ===
All tracks on Disc Two are by Invisible System, a former aid worker in Ethiopia who now creates dub-style tracks with UK-based Ethiopians.

No.	Title	Length
1.	"Closer To The Edge"	3:36
2.	"Gondar Sub"	4:04
3.	"Tizita"	4:04
4.	"Dark Entries"	6:12
5.	"Skunk Funk"	4:33
6.	"Azmari Fuse"	6:41
7.	"Maljam Kehnoelish (If This Is What You Want)"	4:05
8.	"Oumabetty"	3:15
9.	"Hode Baba (I'm Worried He's Moving)"	5:58
10.	"Mama Yey"	5:56
11.	"Fiten Azorkugn (I Turned My Face Away)"	5:49
