= New York–Addis–London: The Story of Ethio Jazz 1965–1975 =

New York-Addis-London: The Story of Ethio Jazz 1965-1975

Compilation album by Mulatu Astatqe
- Released: October 26, 2009
- Genre: Jazz
- Length: 1:16:46
- Label: Strut Records

Professional ratings
Review scores
Source	Rating
Pitchfork Media	9.0/10

New York–Addis–London: The Story of Ethio Jazz 1965–1975 is a compilation album of work by jazz artist Mulatu Astatke.

== Background ==
The album covers his early recordings in the UK in 1965, his work on the Worthy label in New York and his recording in Addis on Amha, Phillips and Axum in the 1970s. The album received the "Best New Reissue" honor from Pitchfork Media.

== Track listing ==
All tracks are written by Mulatu Astatke.

No.	Title	Guest(s)	Length
1.	"Yèkèrmo Sèw"		4:13
2.	"I Faram Gami I Faram"		2:19
3.	"Shagu"		3:05
4.	"Mulatu"		5:01
5.	"Fikratchin"	Menelik Wossenatchew	3:03
6.	"Yègellé Tezeta"		3:14
7.	"Asiyo Bellema"	Frank Holder & Niaaza Alsherif	2:52
8.	"Emnete"		3:29
9.	"Lanchi Biye"	Tlahoun Gessesse	3:08
10.	"Yefikir Tizita"		4:07
11.	"Yèkatit"		3:53
12.	"Ebo Lala"	Seifu Yohannes	3:33
13.	"Wubit"	Muluken Melesse	5:31
14.	"Dèwèl"		4:13
15.	"MascaramSetaba"		1:50
16.	"Girl from Addis Ababa"		3:49
17.	"Kasalèfkut Hulu"		2:42
18.	"Nètsanèt"		5:32
19.	"Ené Alantchie Alnorem"		4:59
20.	"Tezeta"		6:13
Total length:			1:16:46
