= Hirut Bekele =

Ethiopian singer (1942–2023)

- ሂሩት በቀለ
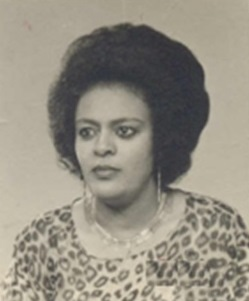
- Hirut portrait in 1962
- Born: 8 October 1942; Addis Ababa, Ethiopian Empire
- Died: 12 May 2023 (aged 80); Addis Ababa, Ethiopia
- Occupation: Singer
- Children: 7
- Musical career
- Genres: Soul; Ethiopian music
- Instrument: Vocals
- Years active: 1958–1994
- Labels: Amha Records; Kaifa Records; Philips Ethiopia; Genet Music Label; Super Sonic Music Label

Hirut Bekele (Amharic: ሂሩት በቀለ; 8 October 1942 – 12 May 2023) was an Ethiopian singer renowned for her contributions to Ethiopian music during the 1960s–1990s. A prominent figure in the Golden Age of Ethiopian music, she recorded over 200 songs throughout her career and became one of Ethiopia's most celebrated female vocalists. She was known for her distinctive voice and collaborations with notable artists and bands, including Mahmoud Ahmed, Alemayehu Eshete, and the Police Orchestra.

== Early life ==
Hirut Bekele was born on 8 October 1942 in Addis Ababa, Ethiopia. Her father, Lieutenant Bekele Kinfe, died when she was four years old, and she was raised by her mother, Tenagnework Mekonnen, and her paternal grandmother, Getenesh Woldeamanuel. Hirut attended elementary school at the Adventist Mission in Kebena, where she excelled academically. However, her education was interrupted when, at the age of 13, she was forced into an arranged marriage by her grandfather, Ato Abegazu. Hirut resisted the marriage and eventually returned to her family, where she continued her education.

== Music career ==
Hirut musical career began in the late 1950s. She initially joined the Army Force Orchestra after being discovered during an audition. Her debut performance, however, was marked by stage fright, and she briefly left the stage during her first show. Despite this setback, her talent was undeniable, and she quickly gained recognition.

In 1961, Hirut released her first album on a 45 RPM record, followed by a second album in 1962. Her early hits, such as "Ye-Hare Shererit," established her as a rising star in Ethiopian music. She later joined the Police Orchestra, where she became one of its leading vocalists. Over the next three decades, Hirut recorded over 200 songs and collaborated with prominent artists, including Mahmoud Ahmed, Alemayehu Eshete, and Theodros Tadesse. She also performed with renowned bands such as the Dahlak Band, Ibex Band, and Roha Band.

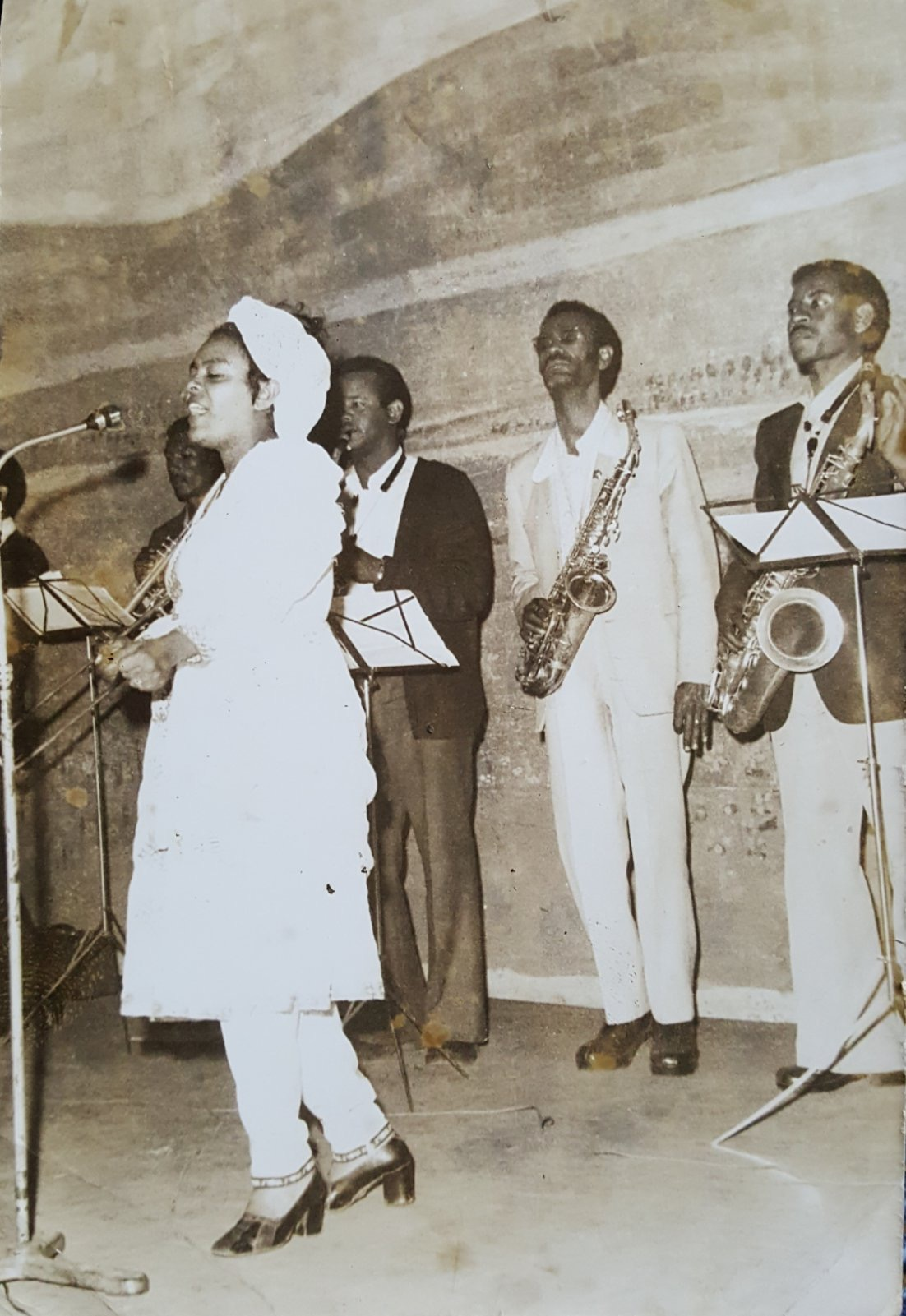
Hirut with Ethiopian Police Orchestra Band in 1970

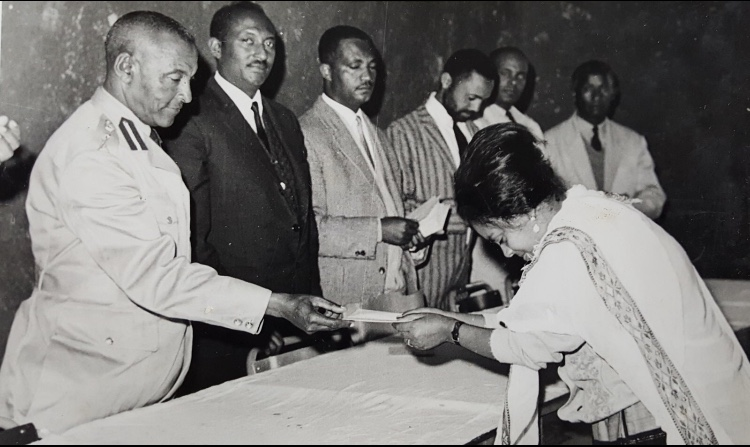
Hirut receiving award from Police Orchestra Band

Hirut's music was characterized by her powerful voice and emotional delivery. She was a key figure in the Golden Age of Ethiopian music, which spanned from the early 1960s to the late 1980s. Her contributions to Ethiopian music earned her numerous awards and widespread acclaim.

== Later life ==
After retiring from the music industry in 1994, Hirut devoted her life to her Christian faith. She became an active member of the Meserete Kristos Church and recorded several gospel albums. All proceeds from her gospel music were donated to her church. Hirut also traveled extensively, spreading her faith and performing gospel music in remote areas of Ethiopia.

In her later years, Hirut battled diabetes and received treatment in the United States before returning to Ethiopia. She died on 12 May 2023, in Addis Ababa, surrounded by her family. Her funeral was attended by many admirers and colleagues, and she was honored with a procession led by the Police Marching Band.

== Legacy ==
Hirut Bekele is remembered as one of Ethiopia's most influential female singers. Her music continues to inspire new generations of artists, and her contributions to Ethiopian culture have left a lasting impact. She was the mother of seven children, ten grandchildren, and six great-grandchildren.

== Artistry ==
Hirut was signed with Amha Records, Kaifa Records, Philips-Ethiopia, Genet Music Label, and Super Sonic Music Label, which were active during the 1960s and 1980s.

== Discography ==
- 1961: First album (45 RPM record).
- 1962: Second album.
- 1977–1994: 14 cassette albums (10 songs each).
- Gelawa (1978)
- Shebelaye (1980)
