= Menelik Wossenachew =

Ethiopian singer (1940–2008)

Menelik Wossenachew ምኒልክ ወስናቸው

Background information
- Born: 1940; Addis Ababa, Scioa Governorate, Italian East Africa (now Ethiopia)
- Died: 24 December 2008 (aged 67–68) Addis Ababa, Ethiopia
- Genres: Ethio-jazz
- Instrument: Vocals
- Years active: 1960–2008

Menelik Wossenachew (Amharic: ምኒልክ ወስናቸው; 1940 – 24 December 2008) was an Ethiopian singer. He was known for his famous singles "Fikir Ayarejim", "Sukar Sukar" "Teyaqiyew Biaschegregn (Ene Wushetenew)" and later "Gash Jembere".

Upon learning at Ethio-Française school in Addis Ababa, Menelik joined Haile Selassie I Theatre Orchestra in 1960. He continued his career as a vocal and director until 1965 meeting with Ras Band, where his fellow Girma Beyene worked in. He exiled to Sudan and Egypt amidst the Derg regime and returned with assistance of Saudi businessman Mohammed Hussein Al-Amoudi in 1993. Menelik died from pneumonia on 24 December 2008; Beyene paid tribute for his death.

== Early life and career ==
Menelik Wossenachew was born in 1940 in Addis Ababa. He spent a childhood years in Harar to enroll a French school, though shortly dropped out and joined Ethio-Française in Addis Ababa for five years. There he joined Haile Selassie I Theatre Orchestra in 1960. He was a backup artist but soon became director of the orchestra.

He sang two songs on the stage such as "Almaz Eyasebkush" and "Fikir Lemn Yiqer", while other "Afer Atinfegign", "Fikir Bastergwami", "Yachi Lij Konjo Nat", "Teyaqiyew Biaschegregn" (Ene Wushetenew)", "YeHarerwa Wetat", "Sukar Sukar" and "Fikir Ayarejim" the latter two were Sudanese origin, written by clarinet player Merawi Sitot.

In 1965, Menelik joined Ras Band while at orchestra, which was assembled by saxophonist Girma Beyene after the first band shifted to newly built Ghion Hotel. The new band consisted of musician of some sort: Beyene as piano and English vocals, Tesfamariam Kidane as saxophonist, Hailu "Zehon" Kebede as bassist, and Menelik and Seyfu Yohannes as vocals. Menelik with Beyene relationship was cordial until the band disbanded in late 1960s.

In early 1970s, Menelik signed with Philips Ethiopia, recorded several tracks throughout the partnership including "Fikirachen", "Mambo Sambo", "Aderech Arada" and "Tebeb Tequami New". While the former two recorded along with All Star Band in assistance with composer Mulatu Astatke, the latter two were recorded with Haile Selassie I Theatre Orchestra arranged by Nerses Nalbandian.

"Tebeb Tequami" was very popular in the time, served as airplay in the Ethiopian Radio education program. He moved to Walias Band in mid-1070s where his old colleagues and Beyene already a member, and began performing at Hilton Hotel in Italian, Sudanese and Amharic languages. The Ethiopian Revolution and the transition of Derg led Menelik uncomfortable to perform. Collaboration with Haile Selassie I Theatre Orchestra has met severe challenges in cases of politically motivation, and ultimately exiled to Sudan and then Egypt.

== Later life and death ==
In 1993, Menelik, with the help of Ethiopian born-Saudi businessman Mohammed Hussein Al-Amoudi, returned to Ethiopia. In 1995, he released a single titled "Gash Jembere" with Ethio-Grooves record. Much of CD's compilation tracklist were ode to Al-Amoudi for his "kindness and assistance showed to him". The song also noted Gash Jembere, a taxi driver near Itege Hotel, who also known for his kindness. The last concert he performed was in December 2005, at the 50th Anniversary of the formation of Haile Selassie I Theatre.

Menelik died from pneumonia on 24 December 2008 in Addis Ababa, after comeback from ear diagnosis in South Africa. Upon notice his death, fellow Beyene paid tribute.

== Discography ==
Albums

Title	Album details
Menelik Wossenachew	Record label: Mahmoud Ahmed Records, Electra Music Shop

Singles and EPs

Title	Single/EP details
"Tibebe New Tekami"	Released: 1967; Record label: Philips, Philips
"Aderech Arada"	Released: 1970; Record label: Philips, Philips
Fikirachen	Released: 1970; Record label: Philips, Philips
Belew Bedubaye	Released: 1973; Record label: Amha Records
"Asha Gedawo"	Released: 1972; Record label: Amha Records
"Menew Bacher Kere"	Released: 1973; Record label: Amha Records
"Mekaberene Liyew"/"Chereka"	Released: 1974; Record label: Amha Records
"Bati"/"Min Nekash"	Released: 1974; Record label: Philips, Philips

Compilation

Title	Compilation details
Gash Jembere	Released: 1995; Record label: Ethio-Grooves
