= Black Jesus Experience =

Melbourne band

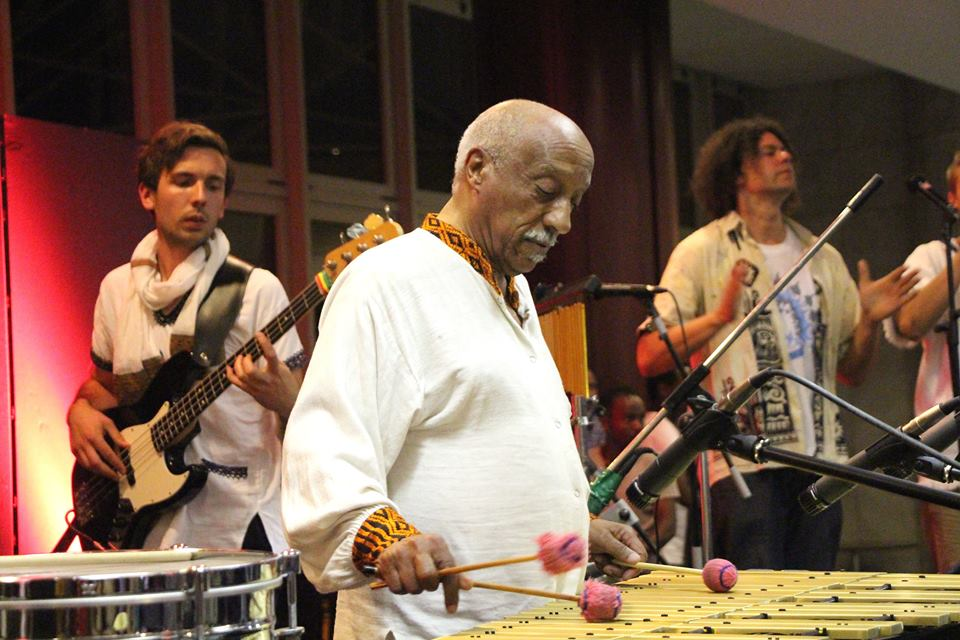
- Mulatu Astatke performing with Black Jesus Experience at the 50th Anniversary of Australian and Ethiopian diplomatic relations event 2015.

Background information
- Also known as: BJX
- Origin: Melbourne, Victoria, Australia
- Genre: Ethio-jazz
- Years active: 2008–present
- Members: Enushu Taye; Peter Harper; Ian Dixon; Liam Monkhouse; Richard Rose; James Davies; Zac Lister; Larry Crestani; Bob Sedergreen; Kahan Harper
- Past members: Chris Frangou; Matthew Head; Patrick Kearney; Cass Horsfall; Hue Blanes; Nashua Lee; Nui Moon; Stuart Perera
- Website: blackjesusexperience.com

Black Jesus Experience are a nine-piece Ethio-jazz band based in Melbourne, Australia. Since 2009 they have been best known for collaborations with Mulatu Astatke as well as a growing discography of independent work. Black Jesus Experience blend traditional Ethiopian music with hip-hop and funk.

Black Jesus Experience have played numerous festivals including Glastonbury Festival, Big Chill, City of London Festival, WOMADelaide, The Big Day Out and Melbourne Jazz Festival, supported Tony Allen and toured Europe and Ethiopia. In June 2009, they appeared on a segment of Sunday Arts, which was broadcast nationally by ABC-TV. They are winners of The Age's "Best Tour 2010" award for their Australian tour with Astatke.

Their fourth album, Migration, received the 'Best Global/Reggae album' accolade at The Age's 2014 Music Victoria awards. In 2016, Black Jesus Experience released their fifth studio album, Cradle of Humanity, a collaboration with Mulatu Astatke, followed by an Australian and New Zealand tour including the 2016 Melbourne Jazz Festival.

In July 2020, Black Jesus Experience released their second collaborative album with Mulatu Astatke entitled To Know Without Knowing following a 2019 Australian tour. The album received critical acclaim, vocals by Taye were hailed 'mesmerising' and the album deemed an 'irresistible collective effort'. As of 2020, the band holds a weekly residence at Melbourne's The Horn African Cafe and Restaurant performing their catalogue each Sunday as well as holding regular live concerts across Melbourne.

== Discography ==
=== Studio albums ===
Title	Album details
Black Jesus Experience	Released: 2008; Label: BJX (BJX 01)
Dark Light	Released: 2009; Label: BJX (BJX 02)
Yeluinta	Released: 2010; Label: BJX (BJX 03)
Migration	Released: 2014; Label: BJX (BJX 04)
Cradle of Humanity (with Mulatu Astatke)	Released: 2016; Label: BJX (BJX 05)
To Know Without Knowing (with Mulatu Astatke)	Released: 2020; Label: BJX (BJX 06)
Good Evening Black Buddha	Released: 2022; Label: BJX (BJX 06)

== Awards and nominations ==
=== Music Victoria Awards ===
The Music Victoria Awards, are an annual awards night celebrating Victorian music that commenced in 2005.

Year	Nominee / work	Award	Result	Ref.
2014	Migration	Best Global or Reggae Album	Won	
2014	Migration	Best Jazz Album	Nominated	
2016	Cradle of Humanity	Best Global or Reggae Album	Nominated	
2020	Black Jesus Experience	Best Intercultural Act	Won	
2021	Black Jesus Experience	Best Intercultural Act	Nominated	
2022	Black Jesus Experience	MAV Diasporas Award	Nominated	
2023	Black Jesus Experience	MAV Diasporas Award	Nominated	
