= Begena =

String musical instrument from Ethiopia

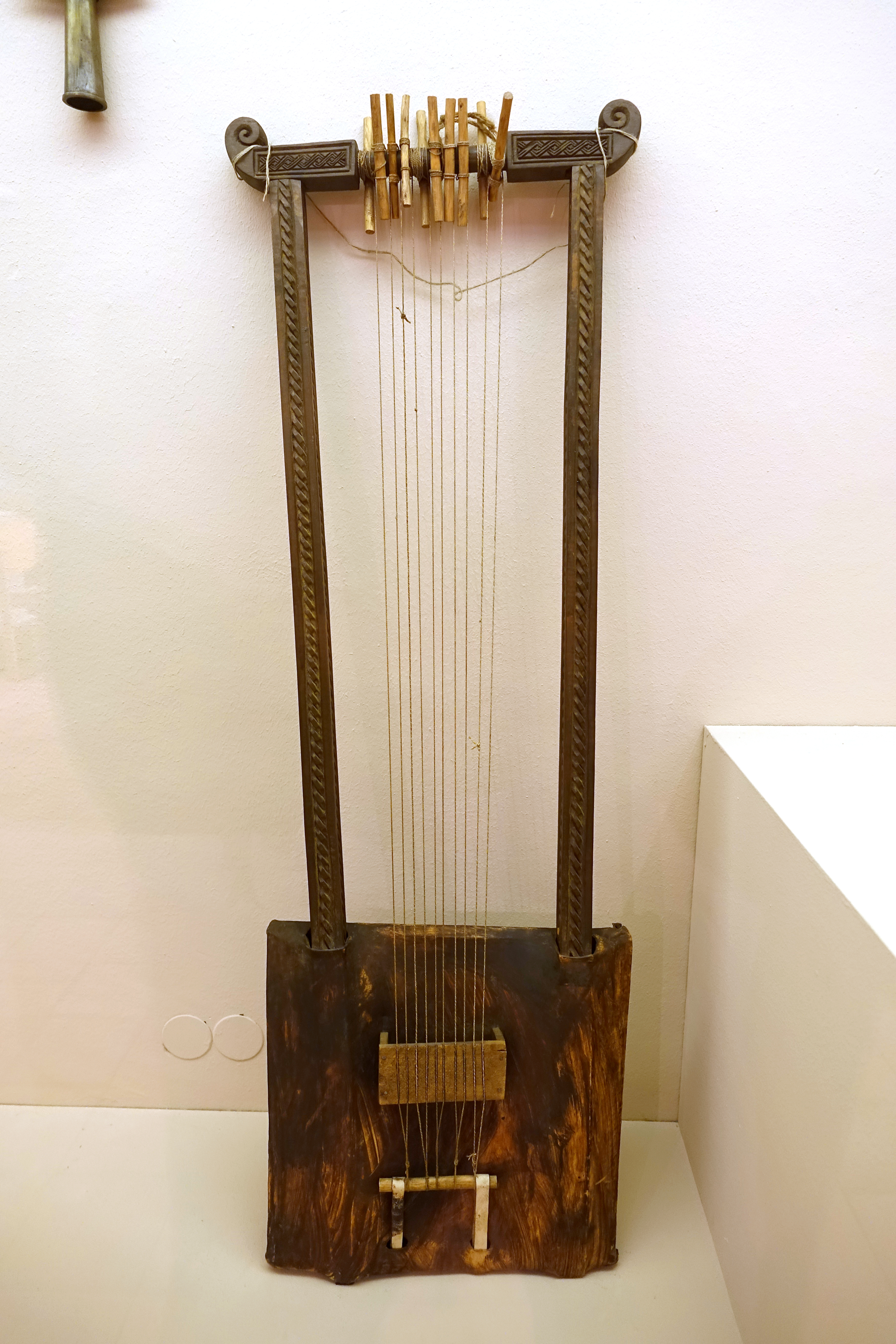
- A wooden Begena with leather skin, gut strings and iron nails

String instrument
- Classification: string
- Hornbostel–Sachs classification: 321.2 (Composite chordophone sounded with a plectrum)
- Developed: early 15th century

Related instruments
- lyre

The begena, (Amharic: በገና) is a ten-stringed box-lyre instrument from Ethiopia, and is the sole melodic instrument devoted only to the zema, the spiritual part of Ethiopian music.

== Etymology and origin ==
The instrument's name is derived from bägänä, "to buzz, pluck, play;" it is etymologically related to the Hebrew נגנ (nagan), "touch/play [a stringed instrument]."

Oral tradition identifies the instrument with the kinnor of the Israelites played by David to soothe King Saul's nerves and heal him of insomnia, and later brought to Africa by Menelik I. Its actual origin remains in doubt, though local manuscripts depict the instrument at the beginning of the 15th century AD.

== Instrument ==
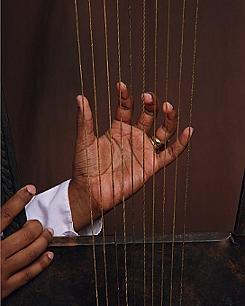
The begena's standard finger positioning.

Known as the instrument of noblemen, monks and the upper class it is used to perform by both men and women.

The begena was used primarily as an accompaniment during meditation and prayer. It is played in the framework of religious occasions. During Lent, the instrument is often heard on the radio and around churches Begena is accompanied by singing voice only. The singer may compose his or her own texts or they may be taken from the Bible, from the Book of Proverbs, or from the Book of Qine, an anthology of proverbs and love poems. Subject matter includes the futility of life, the inevitability of death, saints, mores, morality, prayer, and praises to God. The song's duration varies according to the text, the audience, and the persistence of the player. Though many texts are of a religious nature, the instrument is not used in the Ethiopian Orthodox church services, even if it is seen occasionally in religious processions outside the church. In 1972, the Yared Music School in Addis Ababa began formal instruction in the begena, and in 2004 began evening courses are organized.

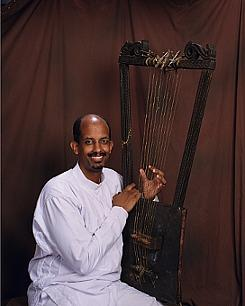
A begena stylist in the common playing position.

The begena has ten strings. However, different musicians use varying numbers of strings to play the begena. For example, begena teacher Memhr Sisay Demissae uses all ten strings to play the begena, while other players may use five or six of the strings. The left hand is used to pluck the strings.

When all ten strings are plucked, one method of tuning the begena is to tune each pair of strings to one of the pitches in a pentatonic scale. When using five of the strings, only the first, fourth, sixth, eighth and tenth strings are tuned and plucked to give sound. Finally, while playing the begena using six strings, the left hand plucks strings one, three, four, six, eight, and ten (starting from the left side when facing the instrument). The pointing finger plucks strings three and four while the other fingers are in charge of controlling one string each. The remaining strings are used for the finger rests or stops after the strings have been plucked, allowing the plucked string to vibrate.

The begena may also be played using a system called girf, wherein a plectrum made of horn or wood is used to pluck the ten strings of the begena. Megabe Sebhat Alemu Aga plays begena both by using his fingertips and girf.

The begena is characterized by a very specific buzzing sound, due to U-shaped leather pieces placed between each string and the bridge. The thong for each string is adjusted up or down along the bridge so that the string, when plucked, repeatedly vibrates against the edge of the bridge.

== Listening ==
Begena scale

- Alemu Aga, The Harp of King David. Ethiopiques Vol. 11, 1994.
- "Éthiopie, les chants de bagana / Ethiopia, bagana songs." Archives Internationales de Musique Populaire [Ethnographic Museum of Geneva, Switzerland] LXXVIII / VDE 1206, 2006.
- Alemu Aga, Seyoum Mengistu, Admassu Fikre, Tafesse Tesfaye. The Begenna of Elders. The Harp of David in Ethiopia. Laika-Records, 2009.

== See also ==
- Alemu Aga
