= Bizunesh Bekele =

Ethiopian soul music singer (1936–1990)

- ብዙነሽ በቀለ
- Born: 1936; Harar, Ethiopia
- Died: 25 June 1990 (aged 53–54); Los Angeles, California, U.S.
- Years active: 1960s–1990
- Musical career
- Genres: Soul
- Instrument: Vocals
- Label: Kaifa Records

Bizunesh Bekele (Amharic: ብዙነሽ በቀለ; 1936 – 25 June 1990) was an Ethiopian soul singer who was popular in the 1960s and 1970s of Golden Age. She was referred to as "Aretha Franklin of Ethiopia" due to similitude of musical style. Her songs were released in her native Amharic language.

== Life and career ==
Bizunesh Bekele was born in 1936 in Harar. After joining Kebur Zabagna Band, by her friend's persuasion, she hosted Tikil Radio entertainment program in 1957, and became prominent in the era. In an interview with Music, Theatre, Art, Bizunesh had not released albums by 1969. Bizunesh recorded popular songs in the 1970s such as "Chenk Tibeb" and "Ayasayegn Chinkun". She sometimes performed with the Gurage singer Mahmoud Ahmed in Amharic. They were both known for appearing with the Imperial Body Guard Band or the Dahlak Band.

She is featured on the recording Ethiopian Groove - The Golden Seventies (1994, Buda Musique).

=== Artistry ===
She has been called the "Mariam Makeba of Ethiopia" and the "First Lady of Addis Ababa".

=== Personal life ===
Bizunesh first married to Kebur Zabegna member Constable Nuru Wondeafrash, who served in the Korean War. Bizunesh was Christian while her husband was Muslim. The second marriage was to Mohammed Endris, a young journalist. In her later life, Bizunesh suffered from health deterioration, with many arguing that she had hearing impairment that prevented her from performing in a tour of the U.S., and an inability to sing after brief recovery. She died in 1990 before her second trip in the U.S. for her medical follow-up.
