= Alemu Aga =

Alemu Aga ዓለሙ አጋ
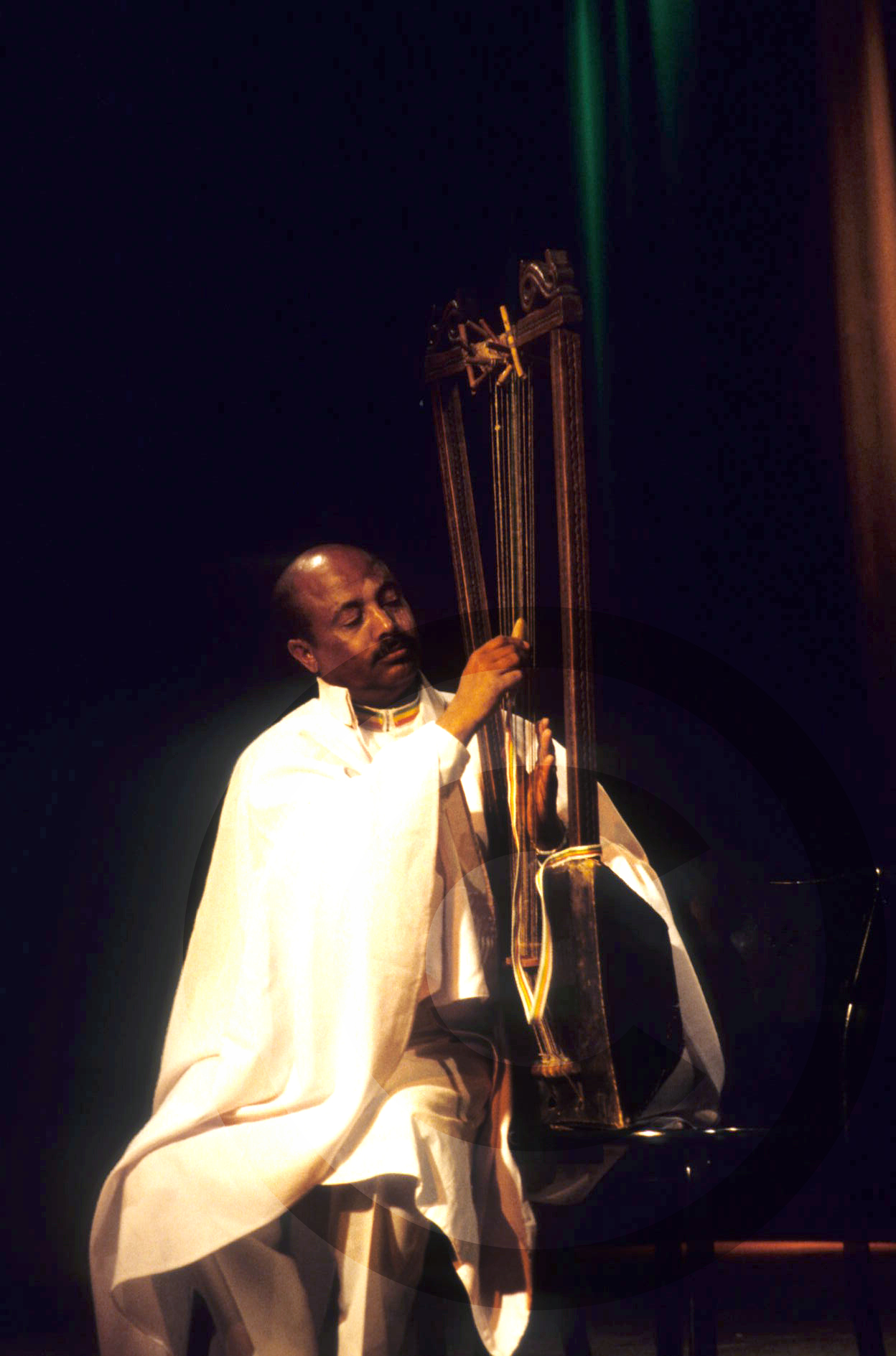
- Alemu playing the Harp of David

Background information
- Born: 1950 (age 74–75); Entoto, Shewa province, Ethiopian Empire
- Genres: Traditional Amharic folk music; Ethiopian music
- Occupation(s): Instrumentalist and vocalist
- Instrument: Begena
- Years active: 1960s–present

Alemu Aga (Amharic: ዓለሙ አጋ; born 1950) is an Ethiopian musician, singer, and master of the Begena.

== Life ==
Born in Entotto, near Addis Ababa, Alemu became interested in the begena (a ten-stringed member of the lyre family, also known as "King David's Harp") at the age of twelve, when a master of the instrument, the Aleqa Tessema Welde-Emmanuel, stayed next door to his family. Aleqa Tessema began teaching at Ras Desta school, where Alemu was a pupil. As well as studying the begena at school, Alemu carried his master's instrument to and from school, and thus benefited from more of Tessema's time.

He went on to study geography at Addis Ababa University, and after graduation went to work as a geography and begena professor at the Yared Music School, where for seven years he also taught begena. Alemu went on to become an acknowledged master of the instrument, first recorded in 1972 by Cynthia Tse Kimberlin for a major UNESCO collection, and performing and broadcasting around the world. In 1974, however, the Derg military junta came to power in Ethiopia; their anti-religious policies also included the banning of the begena from radio broadcasts, and the closing down of the Yared School's teaching of the instrument. As a result, Alemu Aga decided to give up his teaching post in 1980, and opened a shop in Addis Ababa Piazza district.

For a time he played only in private, but the collapse of the Derg's régime led eventually to a change in state policy, and Alemu again began to teach and perform in public. Since the early 1990s Alemu travelled to many countries to perform with his begena. In 1995, together with the krar player Asnaketch Worku, he released the album Ende Jerusalem for Acoustic Music in Germany. In 2009, he released the CD "The Begenna of Elders – The Harp of David in Ethiopia" as well featuring the begena music of Seyoum Mengistu, Admassu Fikre and Tafesse Tesfaye. Laika-Records, 2009.

== Discography ==
Albums

- Ende Jerusalem (1995, Acoustic Music)
- The Begenna of Elders – The Harp of David in Ethiopia (2009, Laika-Records)
- The Harp of King David. Ethiopiques Vol. 11, 1994.

Contributing artist

- The Rough Guide to the Music of Ethiopia (2004, World Music Network)
