= Samuel Yirga =

- Born: Addis Ababa
- Origin: Ethiopia
- Genres: Ethiopian music fused with different styles
- Occupation(s): Musician, composer, singer-songwriter
- Instrument: Piano
- Labels: Real World
- Website: samuelyirga.com

Samuel Yirga is an Ethiopian musician and composer signed to Peter Gabriel's Real World Records.

== Overview ==
At the age of 16, Samuel was accepted into Yared School of Music in Addis Ababa. He was later dismissed for his tendency to experiment and his insistence on playing traditional and contemporary Ethiopian music, instead of adhering to the classical curriculum. His music fuses traditional azmari music, Ethio-jazz, dub, reggae, jazz, Latin, and classical music.

The title of his debut album, Guzo, means "journey". Featured vocalists include the Creole Choir of Cuba, Iraqi-British singer Mel Gara, and Nigerian-British singer Nicolette. Dubulah (Nick Page) produced the album. Instrumentalists on the album hail from Ethiopia, Europe and the Caribbean.

Samuel is also a member of Dub Colossus and Ethiopian funk band Nubian Arc.

== Discography ==
Albums

- Guzo - 2012 (Real World Records)

Contributing artist

- The Rough Guide to the Music of Ethiopia - 2012 (World Music Network)
- Hagere - 2011 (EP, 4 tracks)
- The Habesha Sessions - 2011 (6 tracks)
