= Tilahun Gessesse =

Ethiopian singer (1940–2009)

Tilahun Gessesse ጥላሁን ገሠሠ
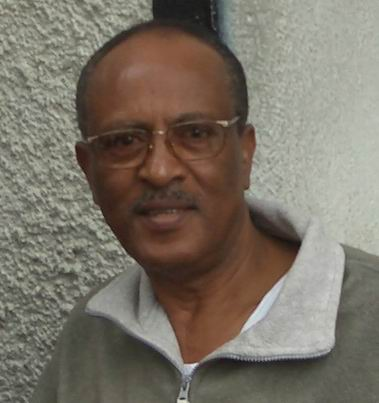

Background information
- Born: 27 September 1940; Waliso, Shewa Governorate, Ethiopia (now Oromia Region, Ethiopia)
- Died: 19 April 2009 (aged 68) Addis Ababa, Ethiopia
- Genres: Ethiopian music; soul jazz; swing; funk
- Instrument: Vocals
- Years active: 1955–2009
- Label: Ethio Grooves

Tilahun Gessesse (Amharic: ጥላሁን ገሠሠ; 27 September 1940 – 19 April 2009) was an Ethiopian singer regarded as one of the most popular Ethiopian artists of the 20th century. Noted by his tenor voice, he was nicknamed "The Voice" during his country's "Golden Age" in the 1960s. Tilahun was an eminent singer whose works are attributed legacy to Ethiopian music. Besides his popularity, he raised money for aid during the famines of the 1970s and 1980s and earned the affection of the nation, being awarded a doctorate degree by the Addis Ababa University and also winning a lifetime achievement award from the Ethiopian Fine Art and Mass Media Prize Trust.

Tilahun died from diabetes on 19 April 2009 shortly after returning from the United States. His funeral took place in Addis Ababa at Holy Trinity Cathedral on 23 April with mass public figures and mourners gathered.

== Life and career ==
=== Early years ===
Tilahun Gessesse was born on 27 September 1940 in Waliso to a father named Gessesse Negusse and a mother named Gete Gurmu.

Tilahun attended the Ras Gobena Elementary school in Waliso where his grandfather lived. As time went by, his interest in music became increasingly clear, although his grandfather urged him to concentrate on his academic studies. The Ras Gobena School principal Shedad (who was from Sudan), encouraged Tilahun's interest in music and urged him to go to Sudan to pursue his music career. Although Tilahun did not go to Sudan, he took Shedad's advice very seriously. When Woizero Negatwa Kelkay, Eyoel Yohanes and other artists from the Hager Fikir Theatre came to his school to perform, Tilahun took the opportunity to discuss his interest in music with Eyoel. He was told to go to Addis Ababa if he wanted to pursue a career in the field.

Tilahun dropped out of school at age 13 and tried to travel to Addis Ababa to pursue his career, a journey he began on foot without his family's consent. Tilahun traveled fifteen kilometers on foot, he was caught in the small town of Tulu Bolo and stayed overnight with his aunt. The next day, he was forced to return to his grandfather in Waliso. Since his interest in music is perceived enthusiastic, Tilahun chose not to stay at his grandfather's house in Waliso. After staying only one night at his grandfather's house, he again began his journey to Addis Ababa, this time hiding in the back of a loaded truck.

=== Achievements and career ===
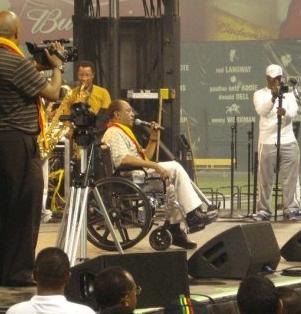
Tilahun at the Washington DC Ethiopian Soccer Tournament in summer 2008

In Addis Ababa, Tilahun was first hired by the Hager Fikir Association, which is now known as Hager Fikir Theatre. After a few years at the Hager Fikir Theater, he joined the Imperial Bodyguard Band where he became a leading star singer. During his time with the band, Tilahun came into conflict with the Ethiopian government after an attempted coup d'état in December 1960 by the Imperial Bodyguard. He was arrested and put in prison for some time.

Tilahun moved to the National Theater where his success continued. His tenor singing was regarded as the best Ethiopian pop voice of the 1960s. His popularity was such that he appeared three times in front of Emperor Haile Selassie I. During a visit, the Emperor advised him not to abuse his talent.

Recordings made by Tilahun during the 1970s and 1980s helped raise large sums of money to aid famine victims. The majority of his recordings were in Amharic, but he did also record a few in Oromo. In 1975, Tilahun released eponymous LP Tilahun Gessesse, Amha Records served as the label.

When collaborating with The Walias, they together worked to re-recording the older version of LPs since 1983 under Misrach Music Group.

Tilahun released his debut single "Yehagere Shita" in 1970, accompanied with 7", mono formats and Philp Philips served as the record label. With these formats, Tilahun continued to release singles and EPs, including "Tiz Alegn Yetintu" (1970), with Mulatu Astatke, "Kulun Manqualesh", "Min Libejegn" (1972), "Aykedashm Lebe" (1974), and "Yikir Yibelatchew / Leyito Blaskerew" (1974).

He received an Honorary Doctorate Degree from Addis Ababa University, in appreciation of his contribution to Ethiopian music. He also received an award for his lifetime achievements from the Ethiopian Fine Art and Mass Media Prize Trust.

Despite some health problems, especially following a life-threatening slash to his neck after a stabbing attempt which occurred on Ethiopian Easter Sunday in 1993, Tilahun still managed to continue to record his music, especially after spending time in the US where he recorded three different CDs with Ethio-Grooves Records. First in 1992 with Tilahun Gessesse Volumes 1 & 2, a double CD of his best works and the first time his music was available to a wider audience outside of Ethiopia. Three years later, he released Wegen Alegn in 1995 followed by Andand Negeroch in 1999. Each album were re-recordings of his older songs which were done by prominent instrumentalists such as Abegasu Kibrework, Fasil Wuhib, Teddy Mak, Theodros Mitiku, Yared Tefera, and other artists. In 2000, Ethio-Sound released a collection CD of his old recordings entitled Tilahun Gessesse Greatest Hits

=== Death and funeral ===
Tilahun died on 19 April 2009 in Addis Ababa as he was being taken to hospital by his wife. He had just returned to Ethiopia from the United States. He had been in poor health for several years due to diabetes. Ethiopian Prime Minister Meles Zenawi stated that "Tilahun stood out as an artist of great renown with his lifetime contributions to Ethiopia's modern music, which he popularized across the world". The Patriarch of the Ethiopian Orthodox Tewahedo Church, Abune Paulos said that "whoever is said dead is he who leave[s] nothing worthwhile behind. Tilahun left numerous, though secular, legacies behind to survive the mortal body for generations to come". As well as the United States Ambassador Donald Yamamoto stated that "Ethiopians owe a great deal to the late Tilahun Gessesse, who promoted Ethiopian music across the world".

A candlelit vigil was held by friends and family in the garden of the National Theatre in Addis Ababa on the night of 22 April 2009. On 23 April, a state funeral was held. About one million Ethiopians, including government officials, and entertainers, gathered in Meskel Square, Addis Ababa and heard messages of condolence from the prime minister and President Girma Wolde-Giorgis. A funeral mass was held in the Holy Trinity Cathedral. Messages of condolence from fans all over the world were posted on a memorial website.

=== Legacy/posthumous ===
Tilahun's death left a lasting impact on the Ethiopian music community, one that has been unmatched with wavering support from other Ethiopian figures. Most notably, Tamagn Beyene, a close friend to Tilahun. A year after Tilahun's passing, a memorial service was held by Tamagn to honor the life and legacy of Tilahun. During the ceremony, Tamagn revealed Kome Limerkish, an unfinished project that was started sometime around 2003. A sample of the first version of the track was revealed to the public during the memorial service before being released as an album in 2021 posthumously. The album was produced by Abegasu Kibrework who dedicated lots of time to put together the project from start to finish.

== Discography ==
Albums
| Title | Year | Label |
|---|---|---|
| Tilahun Gessesse (LP) | 1975 | Amha Records |
| Tilahun Gessesse Vol. 1/ Vol.2 | 1992 | Ethio-Grooves |
| Wegen Alegne | 1995 | Ethio-Grooves |
| Andand Negeroch | 1999 | Ethio-Grooves |
| Greatest Hits | 2000 | Ethio Sound ES-116 |

Singles and EPs
| Title | Year | Label |
|---|---|---|
| "Yehagere Shita" | 1970 | Philips Records |
| "Alegn Yetintu"/"Emnete" | 1970 | Philps, Philip |
| "Kulun Manqualesh" | 1970 | Philips Records |
| 'Sithed Siketelat"/'Yefikir Tizita" | 1970 | Philips Records |
| "Ketero Yikeber"/Ewnet Marign" | 1974 | Philips Records |
| "Sew Manen Yimeslal" | 1975 | Amhara Records |
| "Atkelidge"/"Fikir Sew Ayimertim" | 1975 | Philips Records |
| "Erishiw"/"IIhud" | 1976 | Philips Records |

Contributing artist

- Éthiopiques Volume 17 – Buda Musique 82266-2 (2003)
- The Rough Guide to the Music of Ethiopia – World Music Network (2004)

== See also ==
- Music of Ethiopia
