= Kaifa Records =

Ethiopian record label

- Founded: 1973
- Founder: Ali Abdella Kaifa
- Country of origin: Ethiopia

Kaifa Records was an Ethiopian record label. It released 53 records between 1973 and 1977. Ali Abdella Kaifa, better known as Ali Tango, managed the company.

Singers who recorded for Kaifa included Alemayehu Eshete, Bizunesh Bekele, Mahmoud Ahmed and Hirut Bekele.

== See also ==
- List of record labels
- Éthiopiques
- Amha Records
