= Mulatu Astatke =

Ethiopian multi-instrumentalist (born 1943)

Mulatu Astatke ሙላቱ አስታጥቄ
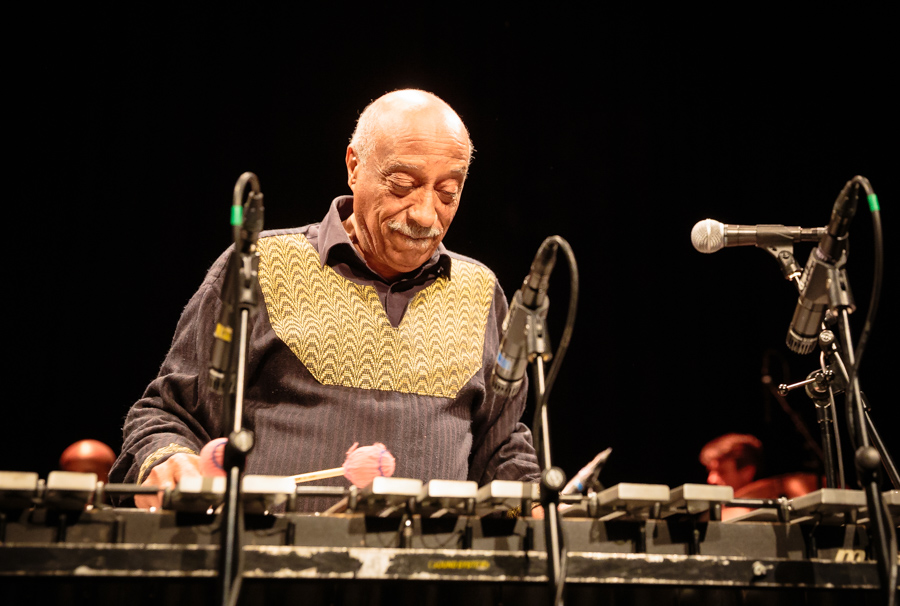
- Mulatu Astatke performing live at Cosmopolite in Oslo in 2017

Background information
- Born: 19 December 1943 (age 82); Jimma, Kaffa Province, Ethiopian Empire (now Oromia Region, Ethiopia)
- Genre: Ethio-jazz
- Occupations: Musician; composer; arranger
- Instruments: Vibraphone; conga drums; percussion; keyboards; organ
- Years active: 1963–present

Mulatu Astatke (Amharic: ሙላቱ አስታጥቄ, romanized: Mulatu Ästaṭḳe; French transliteration: Astatqé; born 19 December 1943) is an Ethiopian musician and arranger considered the father of "Ethio-jazz".

Born in Jimma, Mulatu was musically trained in London, New York City, and Boston where he combined his jazz and Latin music interests with traditional Ethiopian music. Mulatu led his band while playing vibraphone and conga drums—instruments that he introduced into Ethiopian popular music—as well as other percussion instruments, keyboards, and organs. His albums focus primarily on instrumental music, and Mulatu appears on all three known albums of instrumentals that were released during the Ethiopian Golden Age of Music in the 1970s.

== Biography ==
=== Early life ===
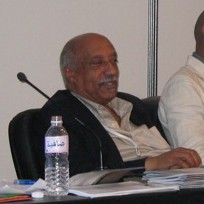
Mulatu in 2005 at the WSIS

Mulatu Astatke is of Christian Amhara descent. Mulatu's family sent the young Mulatu to learn engineering in Wales during the late 1950s; he arrived in Britain in 1959, at the age of 16. Instead, he began his education at Lindisfarne College near Wrexham, and later at Bangor University, before earning a degree in music through studies at the Trinity College of Music in London, where he took piano, clarinet and harmony. In these years he played in Soho clubs alongside African and Caribbean musicians living in London and worked in dance halls with the Edmundo Ros orchestra. He collaborated with jazz vocalist and percussionist Frank Holder. In 1963 Mulatu moved to the United States to enroll at Berklee College of Music in Boston as the school's first African student. He studied vibraphone and percussion.

While living in the U.S., Mulatu became interested in Latin jazz and recorded his first two albums, Afro-Latin Soul, Volumes 1 & 2, in New York City in 1966. The records prominently feature Mulatu's vibraphone, backed by piano and congas playing Latin rhythms, and were entirely instrumental with the exception of the song "I Faram Gami I Faram," which was sung in Spanish.

Mulatu returned to Addis Ababa in 1969 and brought his new sound, which he called Ethio-jazz, back to his homeland while continuing to work in the U.S. He worked largely as an arranger, recording instrumentals that were issued as B-sides of vocal records for Amha Eshete's Amha Records, the first independent label in the country. He collaborated with many notable artists in both countries, arranging and playing on recordings by Mahmoud Ahmed, and appearing as a special guest with Duke Ellington and his band during a tour of Ethiopia in 1973. The tour was sponsored by the United States Department of State, and the two played together at a concert attended by Haile Selassie.

Mulatu recorded Mulatu of Ethiopia (1972) in New York City, but most of his music was released by Amha Eshete's label Amha Records in Addis Ababa, Ethiopia, including several singles, his album Yekatit Ethio Jazz (1974), and six out of the ten tracks on the compilation album Ethiopian Modern Instrumentals Hits. Yekatit Ethio Jazz combined traditional Ethiopian music with American jazz, funk, and soul, and was the first Ethiopian album planned as a single work rather than assembled from earlier singles.

By 1975, Amha Records had ceased production after the Derg military junta forced the label's owner to flee the country. Mulatu remained, earning a living by teaching music, and played vibes for Hailu Mergia and the Walias Band's 1977 album Tche Belew (which included "Musicawi Silt") before the Walias also left Ethiopia to tour internationally. Relations between the Derg and the Cuban government allowed him to visit Havana, where he studied Latin music at first hand.

=== Career ===
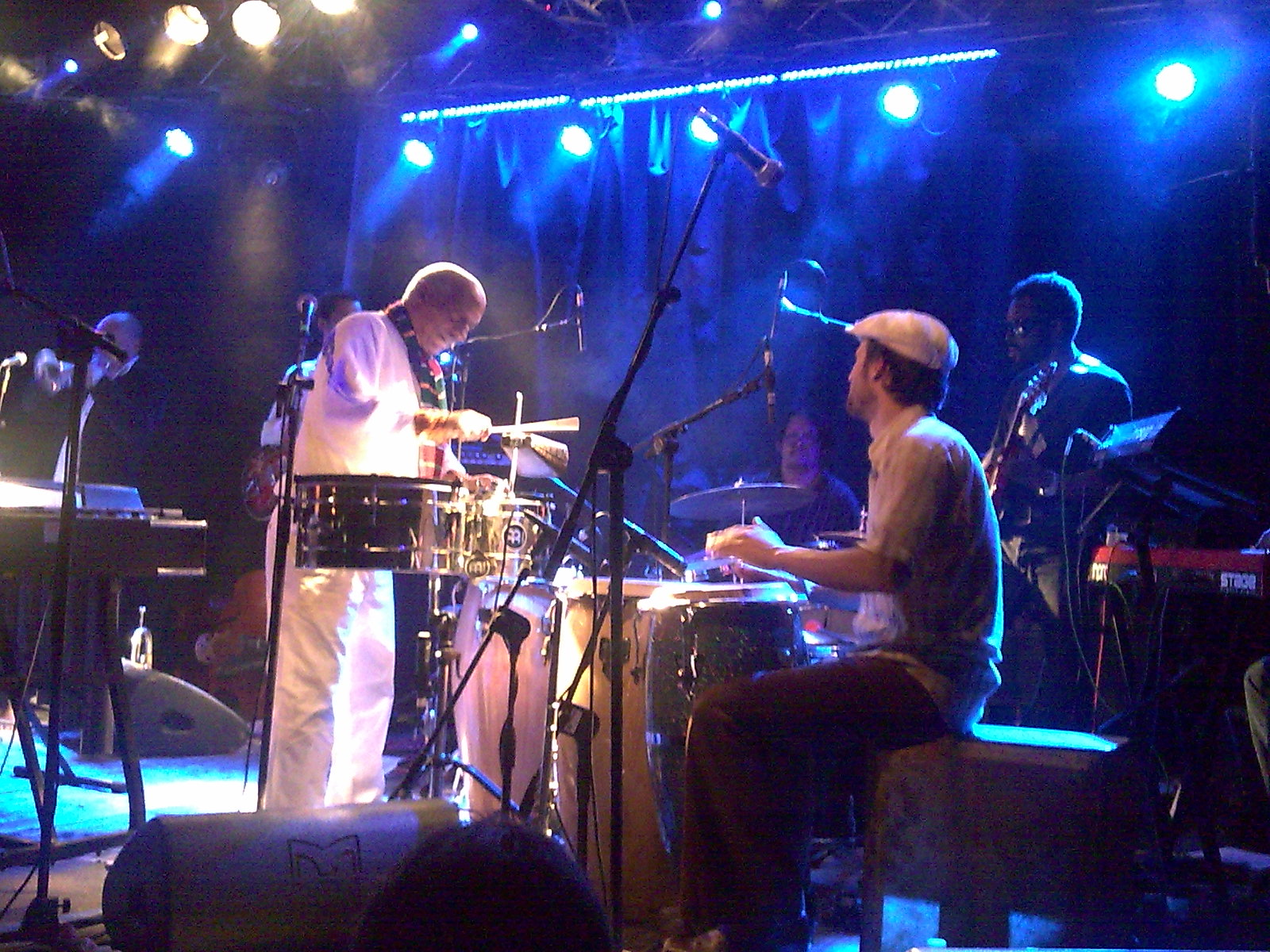
Mulatu Astatke on stage with the Heliocentrics in Rome, Italy, 2009

In the early 1990s, many record collectors rediscovered the music of Mulatu Astatke and were combing stashes of vinyl for copies of his '70s releases. The French producer Francis Falceto traced Amha Eshete, who had returned to Ethiopia after the fall of the Derg, and the master tapes were retrieved and restored. In 1998, the Parisian record label Buda Musique began to reissue many of the Amha-era Ethio-jazz recordings on compact disc as part of the series Éthiopiques, and the first of these reissues to be dedicated to a single musician was Éthiopiques Volume 4: Ethio Jazz & Musique Instrumentale, 1969–1974. The album brought Mulatu's music to an international audience, and by 2014 the series had run to 29 volumes.

Mulatu's music has had an influence on other musicians from the Horn region, such as K'naan. His Western audience increased when the film Broken Flowers (2005) directed by Jim Jarmusch featured seven of his songs, including one performed by Cambodian-American rock band Dengue Fever. National Public Radio used his instrumentals as beds under or between pieces, notably on the program This American Life. Samples of his were used by Nas, Damian Marley, Kanye West, Cut Chemist, Quantic, Madlib, and Oddisee.

After meeting the Massachusetts-based Either/Orchestra in Addis Ababa in 2004, Mulatu began a collaboration with the band beginning with performances in Scandinavia in summer 2006 and London, New York, Germany, Holland, Glastonbury (UK), Dublin, and Toronto in 2008. In the fall of 2008, he collaborated with the London-based collective The Heliocentrics on the album Inspiration Information Vol. 3, which included re-workings of his Ethio-jazz classics with new material by the Heliocentrics and himself.

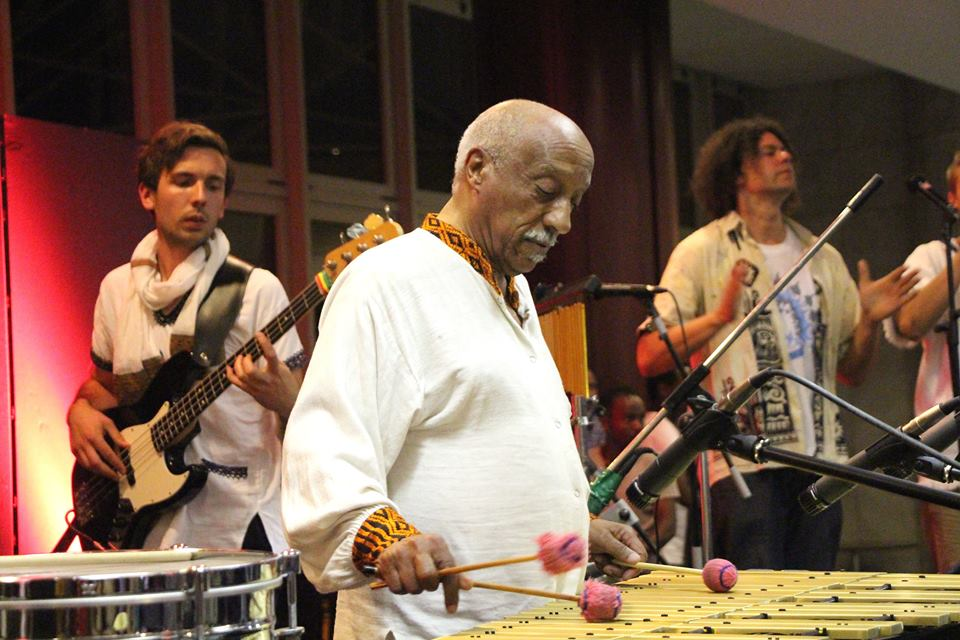
Mulatu performs with Black Jesus Experience members Chris Frangou (bass) and Liam Monkhouse (MC) in Addis Ababa in 2015.

In 2008, he completed a Radcliffe Institute Fellowship at Harvard University, where he worked on modernization of traditional Ethiopian instruments and premiered a portion of a new opera, The Yared Opera. He served as an Abramowitz Artist-in-Residence at the Massachusetts Institute of Technology, giving lectures and workshops and advising MIT Media Lab on creating a modern version of the krar, a traditional Ethiopian instrument. The aim, funded in part by UNESCO, was to extend the range of the instrument to the twelve-tone scale. He has also founded a music school and the African Jazz Village club in Addis Ababa, where concerts are held and arranging and composition are taught.

On 1 February 2009, Mulatu performed at the Luckman Auditorium in Los Angeles with a band that included Bennie Maupin, Azar Lawrence, and Phil Ranelin. He released a two-disc compilation album to be sold exclusively to passengers of Ethiopian Airlines, with the first disc containing a compilation of styles from different regions of Ethiopia and the second consisting of studio originals. On 12 May 2012, he received an honorary doctorate of music from the Berklee College of Music. In September 2019 the French minister of culture, Franck Riester, travelled to Addis Ababa to present him with the Ordre des Arts et des Lettres at the French embassy.

In 2015, Mulatu began recording with Black Jesus Experience for Cradle of Humanity, which premiered at the Melbourne Jazz Festival in 2016 and was followed by a tour of Australia and New Zealand.

Although not featured on the original soundtrack recording, his performance of his composition "Tezeta" is featured over the closing credits in the 2024 film Nickel Boys.

In 2025 Mulatu announced a farewell tour after six decades of performing, playing the Paradiso in Amsterdam in September and the Royal Festival Hall in London in November as part of the London Jazz Festival. The tour accompanied the album Mulatu Plays Mulatu, recorded in London and Addis Ababa with the producer Dexter Story, on which older compositions were rearranged around the krar, the masenqo and the kebero drum. European dates continued into 2026.

Mulatu headlined We Out Here Festival in the UK in August 2026.

== Discography ==
=== As bandleader ===
- Maskaram Setaba, 7" (Addis Ababa, 1966)
- Afro-Latin Soul, Volume (Worthy, 1966)
- Afro-Latin Soul, Volume 2 (Worthy, 1966)
- Mulatu of Ethiopia (Worthy, 1972)
- Yekatit Ethio-Jazz (Amha, 1974)
- Plays Ethio Jazz (Poljazz, 1989)
- Assiyo Bellema (Ethio-Grooves Records, 1994)
- Éthiopiques, Vol. 4: Ethio Jazz & Musique Instrumentale, 1969–1974 (Buda Musique, 1998)
- Ethio Jazz Vol. 1 (AZMARI, 2006)
- Mulatu Steps Ahead with the Either/Orchestra (Strut, 2010)
- Sketches of Ethiopia (Jazz Village, 2013)
- Timeless (Live) (Mochilla, 2022)
- Tension (Batov Records, 2024)
- Mulatu Plays Mulatu (Strut Records, 2025)

=== As a musician and collaborator ===
- Tche Belew with Hailu Mergia & The Walias Band (Kaifa, 1977)
- E così sia and "Ethiopia" with Baustelle (2008)
- Inspiration Information with The Heliocentrics (2009)
- Cradle of Humanity with Black Jesus Experience (2016)
- To Know Without Knowing with Black Jesus Experience (2020)

=== Compilation appearances ===
- Ethiopian Modern Instrumentals Hits (Amha, 1974)
- New York–Addis–London: The Story of Ethio Jazz 1965–1975
- The Rough Guide to the Music of Ethiopia (World Music Network, 2004)
- Broken Flowers (Decca, 2005)
