= Ethio-jazz =

Music genre blending jazz with traditional Ethiopian music

- Other names: Ethiopian jazz
- Stylistic origins: Traditional Ethiopian music; Armenian jazz; afrofunk; soul music; Latin music
- Cultural origins: 1950s, Addis Ababa and northern Ethiopia
- Typical instruments: Saxophone; vibraphone; drums; bass instrument

Ethiopian jazz, also referred to as Ethio-jazz, is a blend of traditional Ethiopian music with jazz, combining the pentatonic scale-based melodies of Amharic music with the 12-tone scale and instrumentation of western music. Over time the genre has gained popularity outside Ethiopia and grown to include elements from other genres such as afrofunk, soul, and Latin rhythms. The genre originated in the 1950s with Armenian refugees such as musician Nerses Nalbandian, who created a fusion of Ethiopian and Western music while working at the National Theatre. Ethiopian jazz was revolutionized by Mulatu Astatke in the early 1960s. Mulatu is considered the father of Ethio-jazz music.

== History ==
=== Nerses Nalbandian ===
The origin of Ethio-jazz can be traced to the 1950s with Nerses Nalbandian, a musician of Armenian descent whose family (including his uncle Kevork Nalbandian, composer of Ethiopia, Be Happy) migrated to Ethiopia in 1915. Nalbandian became the leader of Ethiopia's National Opera after his uncle, Kervok Nalbandian, retired. When Emperor Haile Selassie commissioned Nalbandian to compose music for the Ethiopian National Theatre, he created a fusion of traditional Ethiopian music and Western instrumentation. This was considered the basis of the evolution of Ethio-jazz music.

=== Mulatu Astatke ===
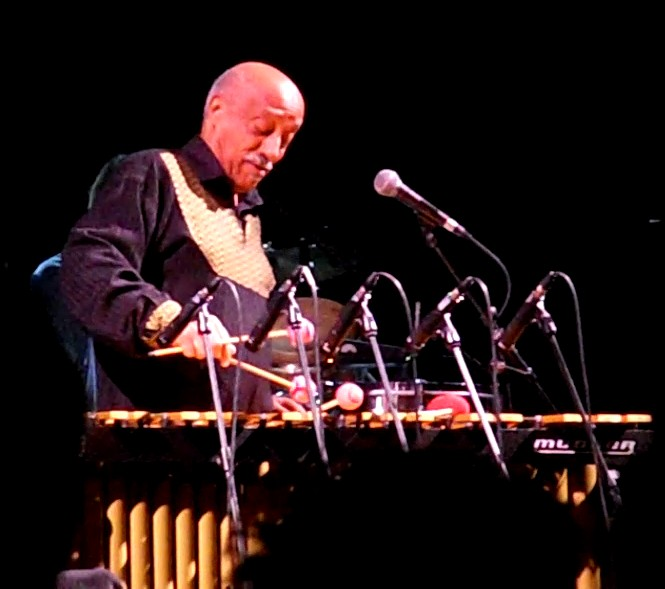
Mulatu Astatke is considered the father of Ethio-jazz music

Multi-instrumentalist Mulatu Astatke has been considered the father of Ethio-jazz. He was born in 1943 in Jimma and developed an interest in music while studying aeronautical engineering in Wales. He went on to pursue a formal education in music at Holy Trinity College in London. Mulatu was interested in promoting traditional Ethiopian music to Western audiences. Beginning in 1963, he also studied jazz at Berklee College of Music in Boston. There, he successfully combined Ethiopian music with Western jazz and rhythms, conceiving "Ethio-jazz".

== List of musicians ==
- Alemayehu Eshete
- Emahoy Tsegué-Maryam
- Teshome Mitiku
- Menelik Wossenachew
- Kai Williams
- Ellie Jaques
- Tilahun Gessesse
- Kibrom Birhane
- Hailu Mergia
- Getatchew Mekurya
- Girma Beyene
- Getachew Kassa
- Tewodros Tadesse
- Samuel Yirga
- Teddy Mak
- Henok Temesgen
- Teferi Assefa
- Esy Tadesse
- Doctor Jonovan Cooper
- Jorga Mesfin
- Fasil Wuhib
- Nadav Haber
- Tewodro Aklilu
- Abegaz Kibrework
- Aster Aweke
- Letarik Tilahoun
- Abiy Woldemariam
- Abiy Osman
- Dawit Getachew
- Dawit Adera
- Henok Mehari
- Yizzac
- Liben Tinos
