= Amha Records =

Ethiopian record label

- Founder: Amha Eshete
- Country of origin: Ethiopia

Amha Records was an Ethiopian record label founded by Amha Eshete. The company released 103 singles and 12 albums between 1969 and 1975.

Prominent singers and musicians who recorded for the label included Alemayehu Eshete, Bizunesh Bekele, Mahmoud Ahmed, Hirut Bekele, Mulatu Astatke and Tilahun Gessesse.

== See also ==
- List of record labels
- Éthiopiques
- Kaifa Records
