= Muluken Melesse =

Ethiopian singer and drummer (1954–2024)

Muluken Melesse ሙሉቀን መለሰ

Background information
- Born: 1954; Gojjam Province, Ethiopian Empire
- Died: 9 April 2024 (aged 70); Washington D.C., U.S.
- Genres: Ethiopian music
- Occupation(s): Singer, instrumentalist
- Instruments: Drums; vocals
- Years active: 1960s–2024

Muluken Melesse (Amharic: ሙሉቀን መለሰ, 1954 – 9 April 2024) was an Ethiopian singer and drummer. He later abandoned his music career to involve himself in the Pentecostal Church.

== Biography ==
Melesse was born in Gojjam, a province in northern Ethiopia now a Zonal Administration in the Amhara regional state. When he was six, he moved to Addis Ababa with his uncle. In 1966, aged 12, he began his musical career singing at night clubs and in groups founded by night club owners, with his first song to be performed on stage, Enate Sitewoldgne Metchi Amakerchign.

His first song on vinyl was Hedetch Alu, which was recorded in 1972 by Girma Bèyènè (piano and arrangements), Tesfa Mariam Kidane (tenor sax), Tekle Adhanonm (guitar), Fekade Amde Meskel (bass), Tesfay Mekonnen (drums) and Melesse himself. In 1975, he recorded his second song, "Wetetie Mare and Ete Endenesh Gedawo", with Equator Band. While the rest of the band emigrated to the United States of America, Melesse remained to join the Pentecostal Church in the 1980s, having ended his musical career.

While he remained one of the singers during 1970s, unlike other performers of the time, Melesse never seems to have been taped by the official state television.

Sometime in the early 1980s Melesse became a born-again Christian, mostly associated with the Ethiopian Evangelical movement.

Melesse was supposedly repeatedly approached to return to his secular music roots but his refusal remained steadfast. Late in life he had some interviews where he decried having been misquoted by magazine editors in Ethiopia. He came out on EBS TV to set the record straight.

Melesse was married and resided in the Washington D.C. metropolitan area. He ministered by traveling all over the world. Famous songs by Melesse include "Menew Kerefede", "Yeregeme Lebe", "Lebo Ney", "Kumetish Loga New", "Wedijesh Nebere" and "Tenesh Kelbe Lay". His song "Nanu Nanu Ney" was an old favorite.

One of Melesse's qualities as a musician was to work on the lyrics given to him by the songwriters. He never took every word as it was presented to him. He changed a lot of the writing to suit his style, sometimes to the point that he seemed to have co-written the music. He was lucky that most of the writers understood him to consent to his whims. Tesfaye Lemessa and Alemtsehay Wodajo are among the most celebrated song writers whose work he performed.

Melesse died on 9 April 2024, at the age of 70.

== Sources ==
- GeoCities, retrieved on March 10, 2012
- Melesse information page retrieved on March
- Fan site 'Music' page:
  - nanu nanu ney
  - agerwa wasa megena
  - lakilgn
  - sewnetwa
  - yelbe endiders
