= Alemayehu Eshete =

Ethiopian singer (1941–2021)

Alemayehu Eshete ዓለማየሁ እሸቴ
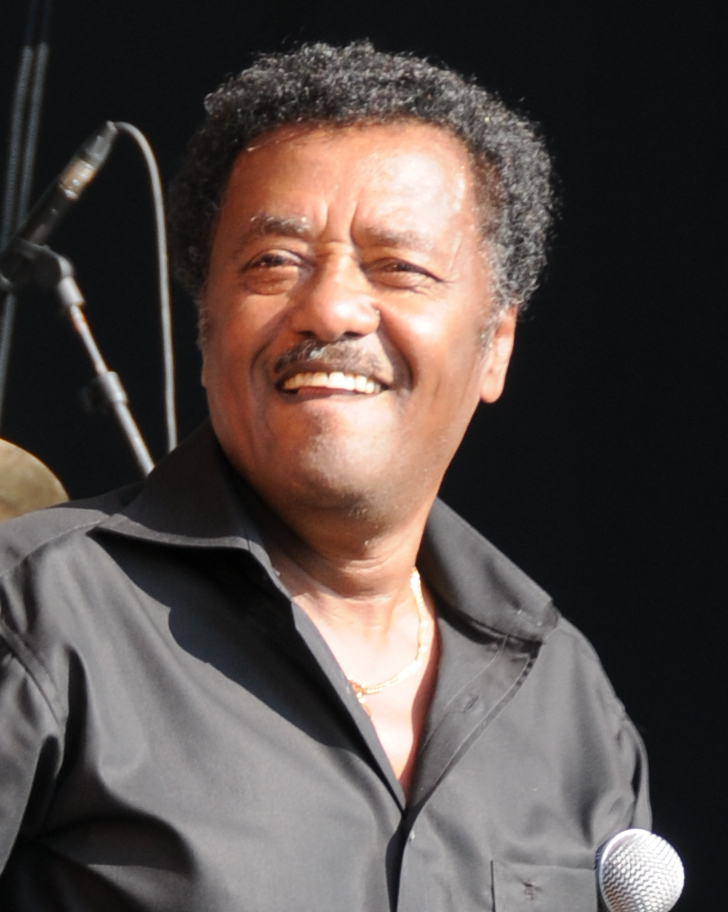
- Alemayehu in 2010

Background information
- Born: June 1941; Addis Ababa, Occupied Enemy Territory Administration (now Ethiopia)
- Died: 2 September 2021 (aged 80) Addis Ababa, Ethiopia
- Genres: Ethiopian music; Ethio-jazz; funk; boogie-woogie; rock and roll
- Occupation: Singer
- Years active: 1960s–2021
- Label: Buda Musique

Alemayehu Eshete Andarge (Amharic: ዓለማየሁ እሸቴ አንዳርጌ; June 1941 – 2 September 2021) was an Ethiopian singer, widely known as the "Abyssinian Elvis" for his dynamic performances and his fusion of traditional Ethiopian music with Western rock and roll influences. He emerged in the 1960s and became a prominent figure in the Ethio-jazz movement, alongside musicians such as Mulatu Astatke. Eshete's music blended Ethiopian rhythms with elements of funk, soul, and jazz, and his hit songs include Temar Lije and Addis Ababa Bete. His international recognition grew following the release of the Éthiopiques series, which featured many of his early recordings. Eshete continued to perform until his death in 2021, leaving a lasting legacy in Ethiopian and world music. His contributions were widely recognized both in Ethiopia and internationally.

== Life and career ==
=== Early life ===
Alemayehu Eshete was born in June 1941 in Addis Ababa, where his father worked as a taxi driver. When Alemayehu was two months old, his mother took him to Dessie, where they stayed until he was three. His father brought him back to Addis Ababa to ensure he received an education. Alemayehu enrolled at the Christian Training Institute near Yohannes Church, where his musical talent was first recognized while singing hymns. As a young boy, he idolized Elvis Presley, mimicking his style and performing songs like Jailhouse Rock (song) for his friends.

=== Career ===
Alemayehu’s talent was recognized by Colonel Retta Demeqe, who invited him to perform with Addis Ababa's Police Orchestra. In 1961, he had his first hit, "Seul," and later founded the Alem-Girma Band with Girma Bèyènè. Throughout his career, Alemayehu became known for blending American rock with traditional Ethiopian music, particularly during the late 1960s' "swinging Addis" era. His fame expanded globally after the release of the Éthiopiques series: Volume 9 is entirely devoted to his early recordings, while Volume 22 covers his work between 1972 and 1974. Other songs appear in Volumes 3, 8, 10, and 13. In 2008, he toured the United States with Mahmoud Ahmed, performing with Boston's Either/Orchestra.

== Death ==
Alemayehu Eshete died at midnight on 2 September 2021 in a hospital in Addis Ababa. He had been suffering from heart disease in the years leading up to his death, and had undergone surgery for blocked arteries five years prior. In his final days, he spent time with friends but experienced discomfort before being admitted to the hospital. He was buried on 7 September 2021 at Holy Trinity Cathedral, Addis Ababa. A large farewell ceremony took place at Meskel Square, attended by tens of thousands of people, where his iconic songs Temar Lije and Addis Ababa Bete were played in tribute. Alemayehu is survived by seven children and six grandchildren.

== Discography ==
Album list
Addis Ababa
- Released: 1992

Compilation albums
Ethiopiques, Vol. 9
- Released: 2001
The Rough Guide to the Music of Ethiopia
- Released: 2004
Ethiopiques, Vol. 22 (1972–1974)
- Released: 2007
The Rough Guide To Psychedelic Africa
- Released: 2012
The Rough Guide to the Music of Ethiopia
- Released: 2012
