= Mahmoud Ahmed =

Ethiopian singer (born 1941)

Mahmoud Ahmed ማሕሙድ አሕመድ
- Mahmoud Ahmed performing in 2005

Background information
- Born: 8 May 1941 (age 85); Addis Ababa, Ethiopia
- Origin: Gurage, Ethiopia
- Genres: Ethiopian music; Ethio-jazz; World music
- Instrument: Vocals
- Years active: 1970s–present
- Label: Philips Records

Mahmoud Ahmed (Amharic: ማሕሙድ አሕመድ; born 8 May 1941) is an Ethiopian singer. He gained great popularity in Ethiopia in the 1970s and among the Ethiopian diaspora in the 1980s, before rising to international fame with African music fans in Europe and the Americas.

== Biography ==
Born in Addis Ababa, Mercato district, Mahmoud was enthralled with the music he heard on Ethiopian radio from an early age. Having received a poor education in school, he worked as a shoeshiner before becoming a handyman at the Arizona Club, which was the after hours hangout of Emperor Haile Selassie I's Imperial Bodyguard Band. One night in 1962 when the band's singer didn't show up, Mahmoud asked to sing a few songs. He soon became part of the band's regular lineup, where he remained until 1974.

After cutting his first single with Venus Band "Nafqot New Yegodagn" and "Yasdestal" in 1971, Mahmoud continued to record with several bands for the Amha and Kaifa record labels throughout the 1970s. The overthrow of Emperor Selassie and the suspension of musical nightlife under the military government created shifts in the Ethiopian music industry—the Imperial Body Guard Band were no more, and Mahmoud continued to make hit records and cassettes with many musicians who remained in the country, including the Dahlak Band, and the Ibex Band. He also began to release solo cassettes, accompanying himself on the krar, guitar or mandolin.

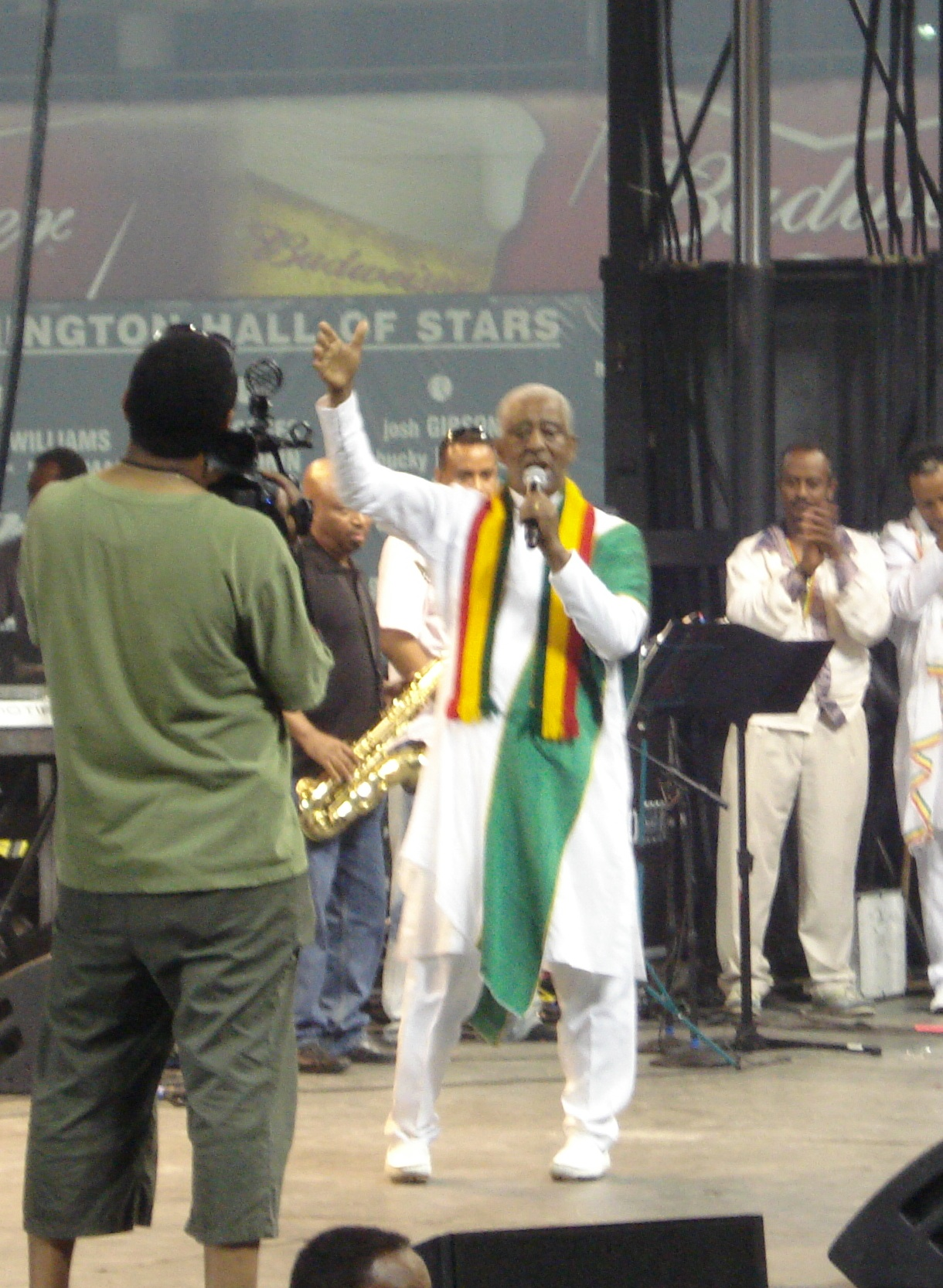
Mahmoud Ahmed performing in Washington DC at the 2008 Ethiopian Soccer Tournament

By 1978, censorship laws prevented Mahmoud from releasing his music on vinyl and so he switched to releasing cassettes. In the 1980s, Mahmoud operated his own music store in Addis Ababa's Piazza district while continuing his singing career. With many Ethiopian refugees living abroad, Mahmoud became one of the first modern Ethiopian music makers to perform in the United States on a 1980–1981 tour with the Walias Band, Getachew Kassa, and Webeshet Fisseha. Mahmoud soon began releasing records with the Roha Band and became popular in diaspora communities.

In 1986, Mahmoud's music reached a larger western audience when the Belgian label Crammed Discs released the collection Ere Mela Mela drawn from two Kaifa LPs Mahmoud had recorded in Addis with the Ibex Band a decade earlier, one being self-titled (ማሕሙድ፡ኣሕመድ). Ethiopia was making headlines in the west because of political repression and famine, and the contrasting tone of Mahmoud's first international release received much acclaim in the burgeoning world music community. Mahmoud gained even greater international popularity in the late 1990s after Buda Musique launched the Éthiopiques series on compact disc. This led to new recordings and tours in Europe and the United States with Boston's Either/Orchestra and Badume Band. Though he has made his home in Addis Ababa and works with a number of NGOs and philanthropic causes, he continues to tour internationally, performing concerts both for world music fans as well as the Ethiopian diaspora.

In 1996, Mahmoud released Tizita, a 10 track CD and Cassette of his best works over the years. He later followed up with a Volume 2, which released about two years later. Both were done by a few members of the Roha Band but they were also joined alongside Abegazu Kibrework and Tilaye Gebre. While Ere Mela Mela made him a household name, Mahmoud is generally known for his Tizita, a genre that reminisces the past with its slow and groovy style of music. The word Tizita translates as memories, which is comparable to the concept of saudade prevalent in Portuguese fado. The song titles on his 1997 album Soul of Addis all speak to similar themes with the words love, lonely, longing and alone are all recurring refrains.

Though unknown to many people, Mahmoud is a visual artist who creates art in drawings and illustrations. He illustrates various themes with a pencil, depending on the mood of the period. He was once approached by the Alliance Ethio-Française in Addis Ababa to exhibit his works but he declined.

In 2000, Mahmoud released Hulum Yisma. The album bombarded fans with new melodies and lyrics that many haven't seen from him in many years. While most songs were arranged by Dawit Yifru, a notable member of the Roha Band, Mahmoud was accompanied by the much newer and younger 3M Band, with notable members such as Elias Melka and Yenesew Tefera.

Members of the 3M Band would later collaborate with Mahmoud to record Yitbarek in 2003, a collection of traditional Ethiopian wedding songs mixed with some of Mahmoud's older songs. The title track along with Musheraye and Hay Loga are notable traditional melodies featured in this album.

Although he hasn't had new recording release in years, Mahmoud's career had remained alive as he has recorded with other notable artists such as Tsehay Yohannes, Gossaye Tesfaye, Tommy T, and other big names.

In 2007, Mahmoud won a BBC World Music Award. In 2015 he featured in an episode of Anthony Bourdain's Parts Unknown in Ethiopia.

== Discography ==
- Almaz with Ibex Band (1973 LP; reissued on CD in 1999 as Éthiopiques Volume 6 by Buda Musique)
- Alemye (1974 LP, reissued on CD in 2005 as Éthiopiques Volume 19 by Buda Musique)
- Ere Mela Mela (1975 LP, rereleased on Crammed Discs in 1986 with extra tracks, remixed, expanded and reissued on CD in 2000 as Ethiopiques Volume 7 by Buda Musique)
- Soul of Addis (1997, Earthworks/Stern's Africa)
- Slow Collections (1998, Sounds of Abyssinia)
- Live in Paris (1998, Long Distance)
- Yitbarek (2003, Yene Production, rereleased by Nahom Records in 2007)
- Tizita Vol. 1 (The Best of...) (2003, AIT Records)
- Tizita Vol. 2 (The Best of...) (2003, AIT Records)
- The Rough Guide to the Music of Ethiopia (2004, World Music Network)
- Ethiogroove: Mahmoud Ahmed & Either/Orchestra, with Tsedenia G. Markos (2007, EthioSonic DVD)
- Éthiopiques Live: Mahmoud Ahmed, Alemayehu Eshete & Badume's Band (2009, Innacor DVD)
- Éthiopiques 26: Mahmoud Ahmed & Imperial Bodyguard Band, 1972–1974 (collects music from singles released on the Philips label)
- The Rough Guide to the Music of Ethiopia (2012, World Music Network)
