= Girma Bèyènè =

Ethiopian musician and multi-instrumentalist

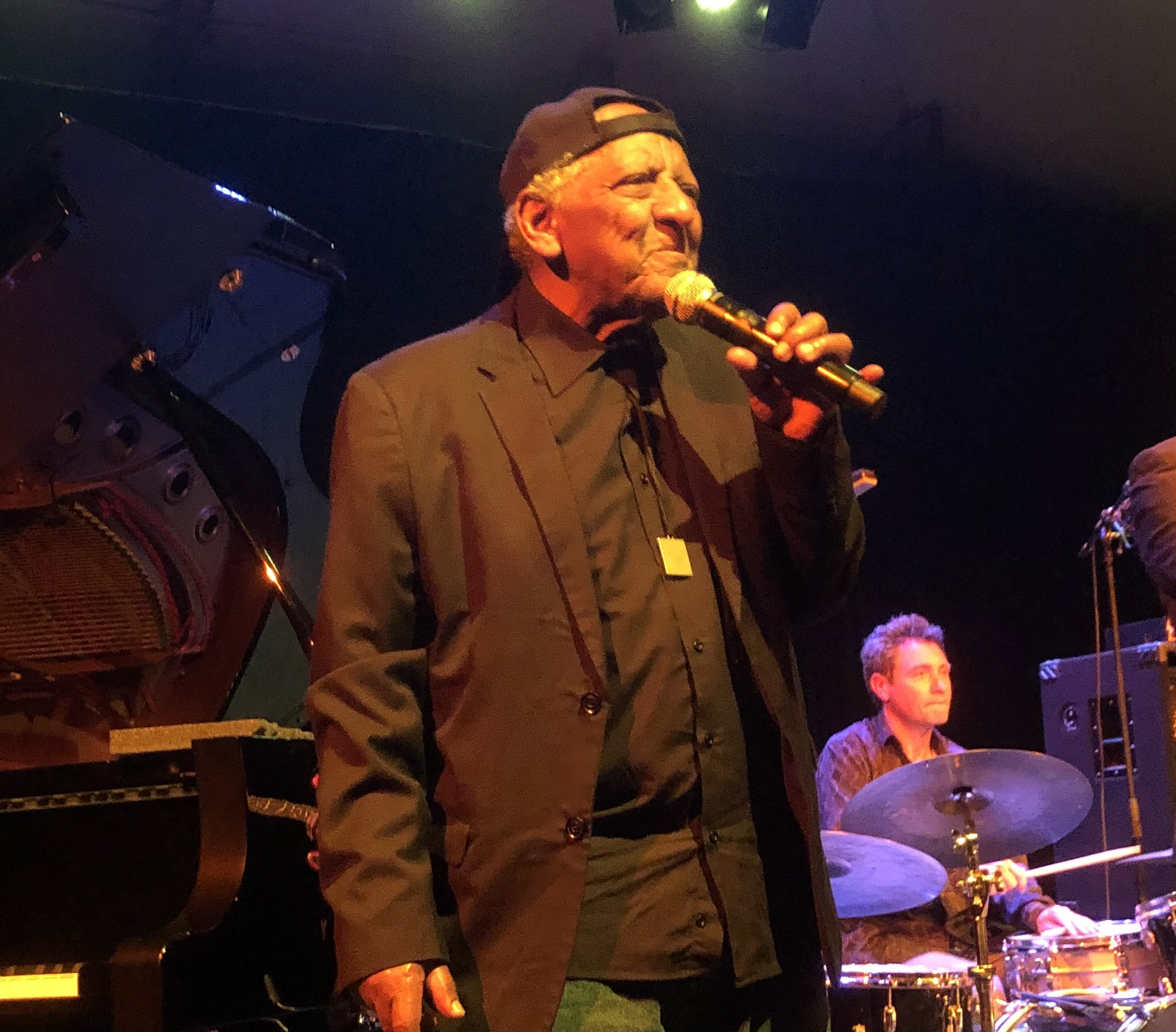
- Born: 1957 (age 68–69); Addis Ababa
- Occupations: Organist; Singer

Girma Bèyènè (Amharic: ግርማ በየነ), born in Addis Ababa, is an Ethiopian lyricist, composer, arranger, vocalist, and pianist, most active during the golden era of Ethiopian vinyl records (1969–78). He is expressed by many as "Ethiopian gem". He only recorded four songs as a vocalist, but arranged more than 60 titles, and collaborated on at least 25 other tracks. Girma left Ethiopia during the Derg military dictatorship to live in the United States, where he disappeared into the diaspora and ceased to play music. He released a new album in 2017, part of the Ethiopiques collection.

== Discography ==
Contributing artist

- Éthiopiques Volume 8: Swinging Addis (2000, Buda Musique)
- The Rough Guide to the Music of Ethiopia (2004, World Music Network)
- Ethiopiques Vol. 20: Live in Addis (2005, Buda Musique)
- Éthiopiques Volume 22: Alèmayèhu Eshèté, featuring Girma Bèyènè (2007, Buda Musique)

Lead artist

- Éthiopiques Volume 30: "Mistakes On Purpose", Girma Bèyènè & Akalé Wubé (2017, Buda Musique)
