= Éthiopiques =

Compilation album by various Ethiopian artists

Éthiopiques is a series of compact discs featuring Ethiopian singers and musicians. Many of the CDs compile songs from various singles and albums that Amha Records, Kaifa Records and Philips-Ethiopia released during the 1960s and 1970s in Ethiopia. Prominent singers and musicians from this era appearing on Éthiopiques releases include Alemayehu Eshete, Asnaketch Worku, Mahmoud Ahmed, Mulatu Astatke and Tilahun Gessesse. However, some other releases contain new recordings.

== Overview ==
The Paris-based world music record label Buda Musique began the Éthiopiques series in 1997 and initially compiled Ethiopian popular music releases from the 1960s and 1970s. Some of the subsequent CDs focus on traditional music, while others highlight individual musicians or specific styles. As of 2017, there have been 30 releases. None of the CDs feature modern-day synthesizer-based Ethiopian pop music. Francis Falceto is the producer of the series. 32 volumes have been released, each spotlighting different artists or styles.

Some songs from Éthiopiques Volume 4 were featured in the Jim Jarmusch film Broken Flowers.

== Discography ==
- (1998) Éthiopiques Volume 1: The Golden Years of Modern Ethiopian Music, various artists
- (1998) Éthiopiques Volume 2: Tètchawèt! Urban Azmaris of the 90s, various artists
- (1998) Éthiopiques Volume 3: Golden Years of Modern Ethiopian Music 1969–1975, various artists
- (1998) Éthiopiques Volume 4: Ethio Jazz & Musique Instrumentale, 1969–1974, Mulatu Astatke
- (1999) Éthiopiques Volume 5: Tigrigna Music, various artists
- (1999) Éthiopiques Volume 6: Almaz, Mahmoud Ahmed
- (1999) Éthiopiques Volume 7: Ere Mela Mela, Mahmoud Ahmed
- (2000) Éthiopiques Volume 8: Swinging Addis, various artists
- (2001) Éthiopiques Volume 9: Alemayehu Eshete
- (2002) Éthiopiques Volume 10: Tezeta - Ethiopian Blues & Ballads, various artists
- (2002) Éthiopiques Volume 11: The Harp of King David, Alemu Aga
- (2003) Éthiopiques Volume 12: Konso Music and Songs, various artists
- (2003) Éthiopiques Volume 13: Ethiopian Groove, various artists
- (2003) Éthiopiques Volume 14: Negus of Ethiopian Sax, Getatchew Mekurya
- (2003) Éthiopiques Volume 15: Jump to Addis, various artists
- (2003) Éthiopiques Volume 16: The Lady with the Krar, Asnaketch Worku
- (2004) Éthiopiques Volume 17: Tilahun Gessesse
- (2004) Éthiopiques Volume 18: Asguèbba! various artists
- (2005) Éthiopiques Volume 19: Alemye, Mahmoud Ahmed
- (2005) Live in Addis, Either/Orchestra with Mulatu Astatke, Getatchew Mekurya, Tsedenia G. Markos, Bahta Hewet, Michael Belayneh
- (2006) Éthiopiques Volume 21: Ethiopia Song, Emahoy Tsegué-Maryam Guèbrou
- (2007) Éthiogroove (DVD): Mahmoud Ahmed & Either/Orchestra, with Tsedenia G. Markos
- (2007) Éthiopiques 22: More Vintage! 1972-1974: Alèmayèhu Eshèté
- (2007) Éthiopiques Volume 23: Orchestra Ethiopia
- (2007) The Very Best of Éthiopiques: Hypnotic Grooves from the Legendary Series
- (2009) Éthiopiques Volume 24: Golden Years of Modern Ethiopian Music 1969–1975
- (2009) Éthiopiques Volume 25: Modern Roots 1971–1975
- (2010) Éthiopiques Volume 26: Mahmoud Ahmed & His Imperial Bodyguard Band 1972-74
- (2010) Éthiopiques Volume 27: Centennial of the First Ethiopian Recordings, Azmari Tèssèma Eshèté 1910
- (2011) The Very Best of Éthiopiques: Cult Hits from the Original Series
- (2013) Éthiopiques Volume 28: Great Oromo Music, Ali Mohammed Birra
- (2014) Éthiopiques Volume 29: Kassa Tessema, Mastawesha
- (2017) Éthiopiques Volume 30, "Mistakes On Purpose": Girma Bèyènè & Akalé Wubé
- (2026) Éthiopiques Volume 31: Muluken Mèllèssè
- (2026) Éthiopiques Volume 32: Nalbandian The Ethiopian, Either/Orchestra & Ethiopian Guests
