= Buda Musique =

French record label

- Founded: 1987; 38 years ago
- Founder: Gilles Fruchaux, Dominique Buscall
- Genre: World music
- Location: France
- Official website: budamusique.com

Buda Musique is a French record label specializing in world music. It was founded in 1987 by Gilles Fruchaux and Dominique Buscall. After Buscall died in 1990, Fruchaux became the sole owner. The label is especially known for its 32 Volume Éthiopiques series.

Buda Musique has released over 400 albums, including recordings by ethio-jazz figures Mulatu Astatke, Mahmoud Ahmed, Alemayehu Eshete, saxophonist Getatchew Mekurya; klezmer musicians as Nano Peylet, Denis Cuniot, Yom; and world-music singers and bands like Les Yeux Noirs, Lo Còr de la Plana, Los Incas, Ray Lema, Cheikha Remitti, Cheb Hasni, Mugar and Jean-Pierre Drouet among others.
