= Culture of Ethiopia =

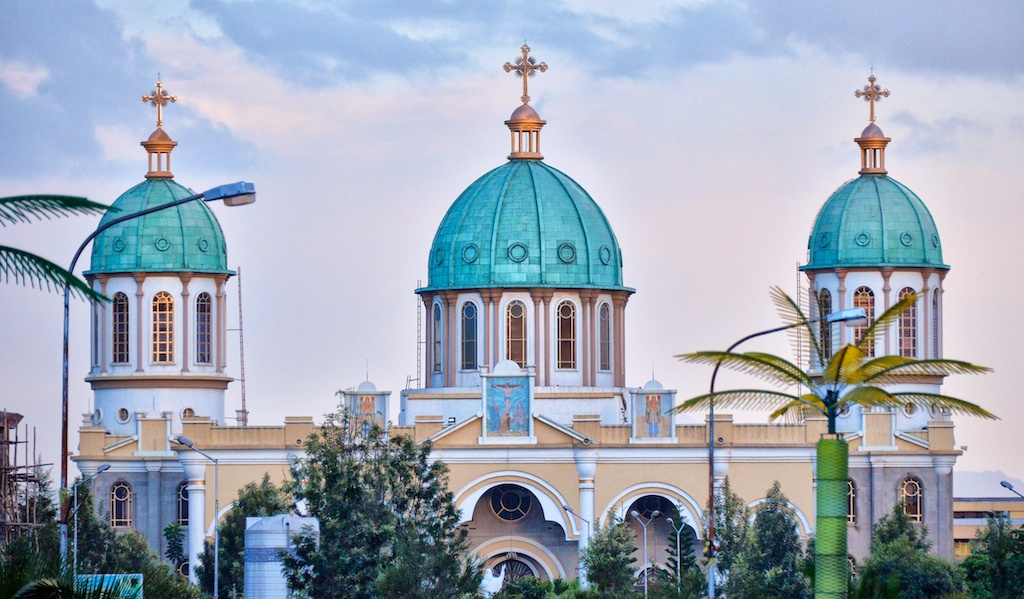
Medhane Alem Cathedral in Addis Ababa

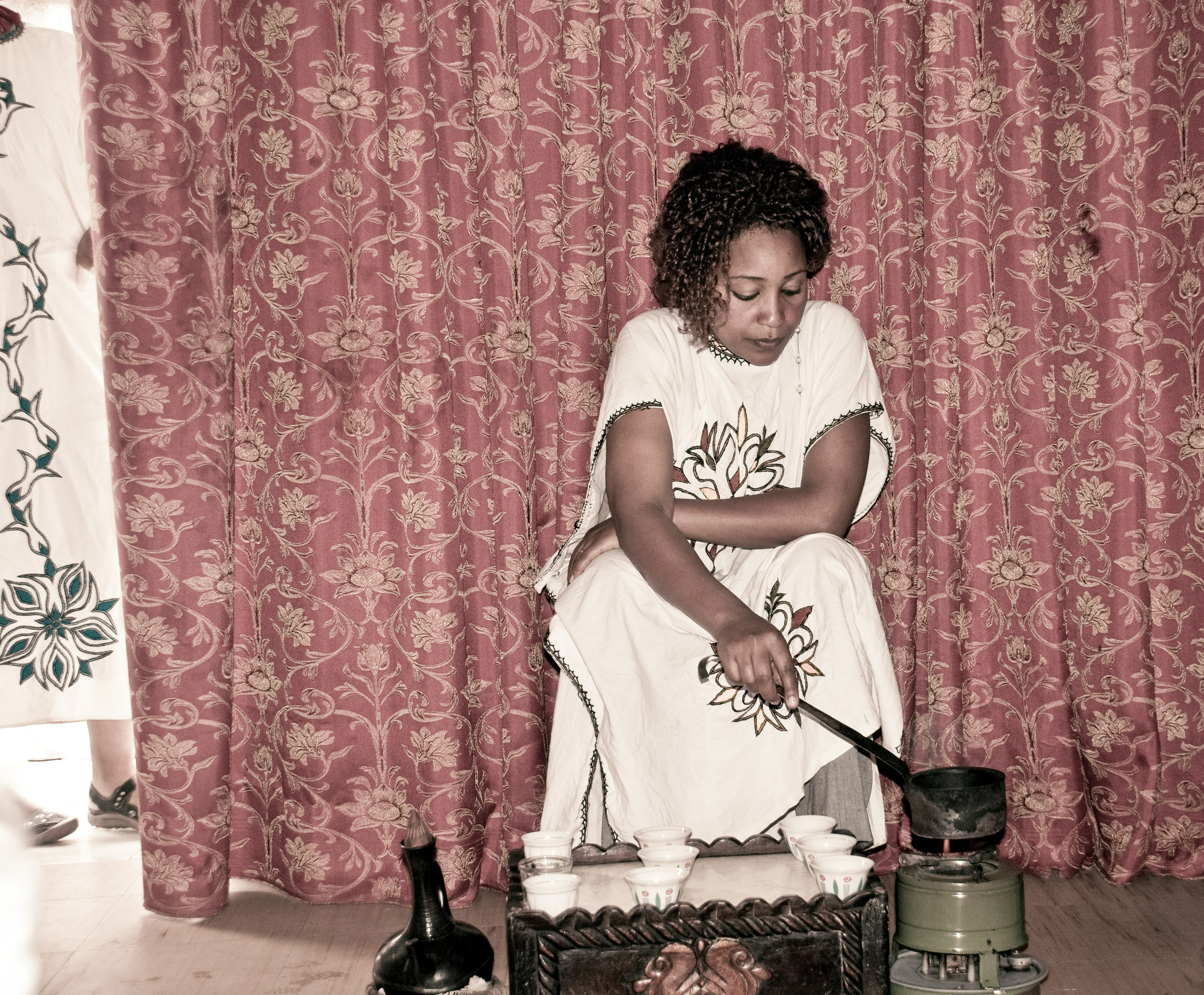
Ethiopian woman wearing a traditional Habesha kemis dress, preparing coffee using a Jebena

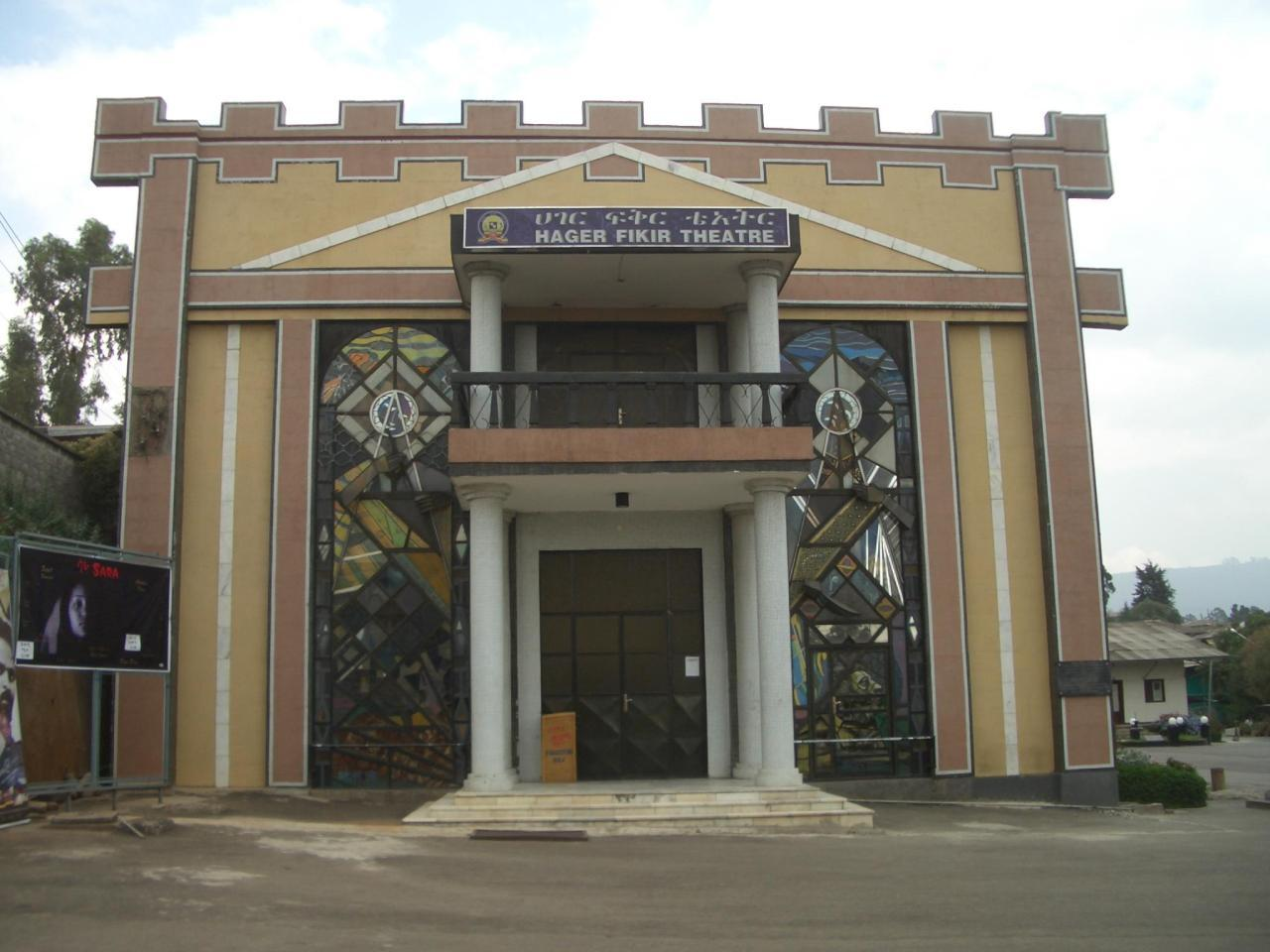
The Hager Fikir Theatre in Addis Ababa, founded in 1935

The culture of Ethiopia is diverse and generally structured along ethnolinguistic lines. The country's Afro-Asiatic-speaking majority adhere to an amalgamation of traditions that were developed independently and through interaction with neighboring and far away civilizations, including other parts of Northeast Africa, the Arabian Peninsula, India, and Italy. By contrast, the nation's Nilotic communities and other ethnolinguistic minorities tend to practice customs more closely linked with South Sudan or the African Great Lakes region.

== Music ==
The music of Ethiopia is extremely diverse, with each of the country's ethnic groups being associated with their own sounds. Some forms of traditional music are strongly influenced by folk music from elsewhere in the Horn of Africa, especially Somalia. In southeastern Ethiopia, in Wollo, a Muslim musical form called manzuma developed in 1907. Sung in Amharic and Oromo most notably in Dire Dawa, Harar and Jimma where Ethiopian Muslims reside. In the Ethiopian Highlands, traditional secular music is played by itinerant musicians called azmari (Zageth), who are regarded with both suspicion and respect in Ethiopian society.

=== Chordophones ===
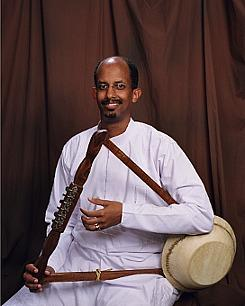
A krar player.

In the North, traditional string instruments include the masenqo, a one-string bowed lute; the krar (also known as kirar), and a large ten-string lyre. The dita (a five-string lyre) and musical bows (including an unusual three-string variant) are among the chordophones found in the south. Also "kebero" ( a drum) used by the religious group like the Orthodox's or other Christian religious group to praise what they believe in.

=== Aerophones ===
The washint is a bamboo flute that is common throughout or in the highlands (Central and North). Trumpet-like instruments include the ceremonial malakat used in some regions, and the holdudwa (animal horn; compare shofar) found mainly in the south. Embilta flutes have no finger holes, and produce only two tones, the fundamental and a fourth or fifth interval. These may be metal (generally found in the north) or bamboo (in the south). The Konso and other people in the south play fanta, or pan flutes.

=== Idiophones ===
In the Ethiopian Orthodox Church, liturgical music employs the senasel, a sistrum. Additionally, the clergy will use prayer staffs, or maqwamiya, to maintain rhythm. Rural churches historically used a dawal, made from stone slabs or pieces of wood, in order to call the faithful to prayer. The Beta Israel use a small gong called a qachel as liturgical accompaniment, though qachel may also refer to a small bell. The toom, a lamellophone, is used among the Nuer, Anuak, Majangir, Surma, and other Nilo-Saharan groups. Metal leg rattles are common throughout the south.

=== Membranophones ===
The kebero (ከበሮ) is a large hand drum used in the Orthodox Christian liturgy. Smaller kebero drums may be used in secular celebrations. The nagarit (ነጋሪት), played with a curved stick, is usually found in a secular context such as royal functions or the announcement of proclamations, though it has a liturgical function among the Beta Israel. The Gurage and other southern peoples commonly play the atamo, a small hand drum sometimes made of clay.

=== Popular music ===
Ethiopia is a musically traditional country. Popular music is played, recorded and listened to, but most musicians also sing traditional songs, and most audiences choose to listen to both popular and traditional styles. A long-standing popular musical tradition in Ethiopia was that of brass bands, imported from Jerusalem in the form of forty Armenian orphans (Arba Lijoch) during the reign of Haile Selassie. This band, which arrived in Addis Ababa on 6 September 1924, became the first official orchestra of Ethiopia. By the end of World War II, large orchestras accompanied singers; the most prominent orchestras were the Army Band, Police Band, and Imperial Bodyguard Band. Most of these bands were trained by Europeans or Armenians.

From the 1950s to the 1970s, Ethiopian popular musicians included Bizunesh Bekele, Mahmoud Ahmed, Alemayehu Eshete, Hirut Bekele, Ali Birra, Ayalew Mesfin, Kiros Alemayehu, Muluken Melesse and Tilahun Gessesse, while popular folk musicians included Alemu Aga, Kassa Tessema, Ketema Makonnen, Asnaketch Worku, and Mary Armede. Perhaps the most influential musician of the period, however, was Ethio-jazz innovator Mulatu Astatke. Amha Records, Kaifa Records, and Philips-Ethiopia were prominent Ethiopian record labels during this era. Since 1997, Buda Musique's Éthiopiques series has compiled many of these singles and albums on compact disc.

During the 1980s, the Derg controlled Ethiopia, and emigration became almost impossible. Musicians during this period included Ethio Stars, Wallias Band and Roha Band, though the singer Neway Debebe was most popular. He helped to popularize the use of Sem ena Worq (wax and gold, a poetic form of double entendre) in music (previously only used in qiné, or poetry) that often enabled singers to criticize the government without upsetting the censors.

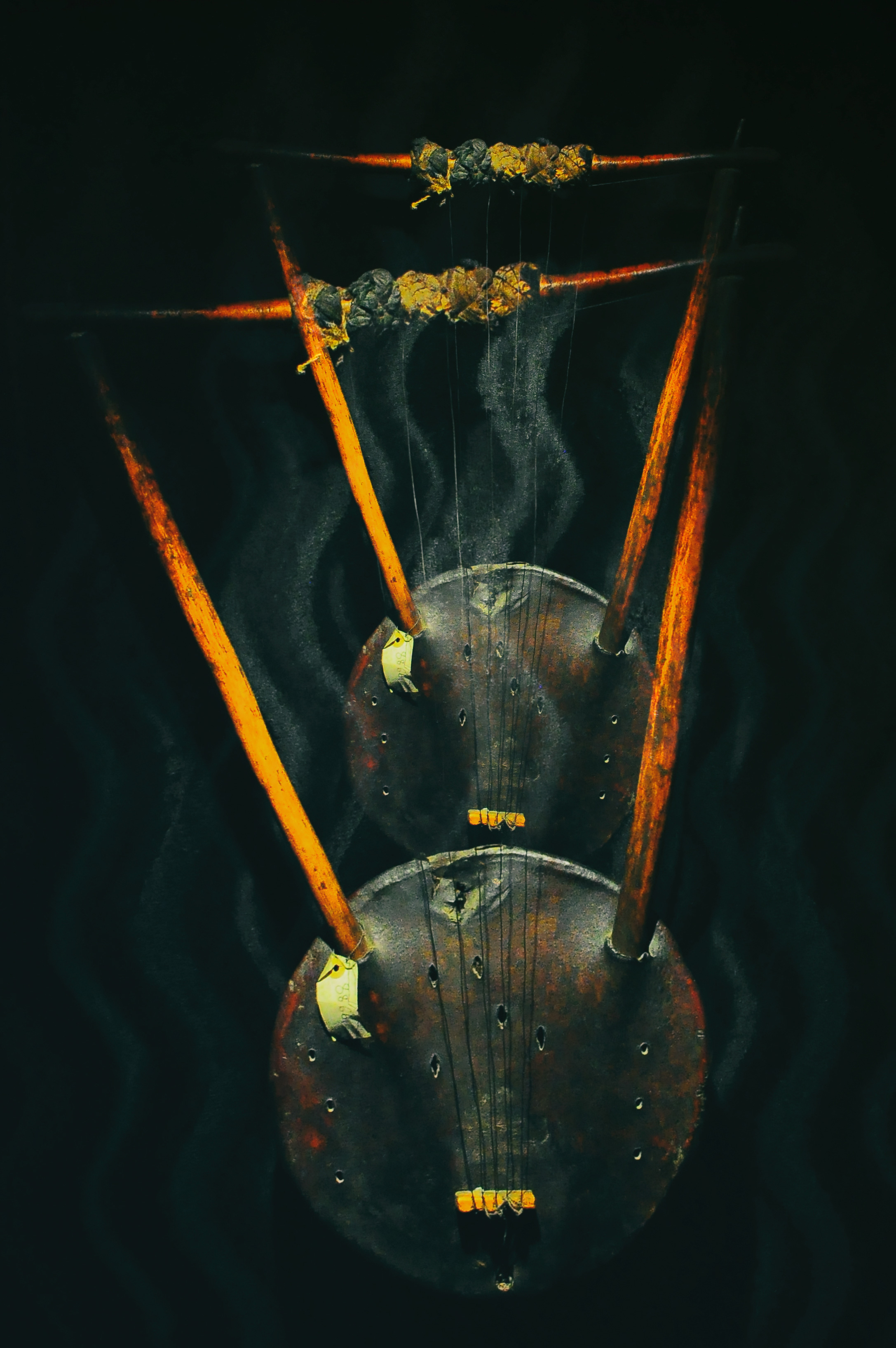
Ethiopian traditional musical instrument called kirar

=== Contemporary scene ===
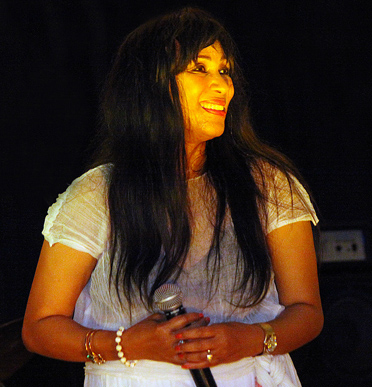
Popular Ethiopian singer Aster Aweke.

Popular musicians from Ethiopia include internationally renowned and recognized artists such as the Los Angeles–area expatriate Aster Aweke, The Weeknd and Teddy Afro, who is often accredited with the fusion of Rastafarian styles into mainstream Ethiopian music. More recently, music from Tigray and Eritrea has become popular in Ethiopia and among exiles, especially in Italy. One of the biggest new trends, however, has been the rise of bolel, a sort of blues-like music, played by sarcastic azmari playing in parts of Addis Ababa, especially Yohannès Sefer and Kazentchis. Bolel musicians include Tigist Assefa, Tedje and Admassou Abate.

Other popular performers include Tewodros Tadesse, Neway Debebe, Ephrem Tamiru, Tadesse Alemu, Hamelmal Abate, Martha Ashagari, Yohannes Berhanu, Kuku Sebsebe, Aster Aweke, and Manalemosh Dibo. Neway was very popular among the youth of the 1980s and early 1990s with such songs as "Yetekemt Abeba," "Metekatun Ateye," "Safsaf," and "Gedam," among others. Abatte Barihun has exemplified all four main qenets on his 2005 album Ras Deshen.

Éthiopiques producer Francis Falceto criticizes contemporary Ethiopian music for eschewing traditional instruments and ensemble playing in favor of one-man bands using synthesizers. Harvard University professor Kay Kaufman Shelemay, on the other hand, maintains that there is genuine creativity in the contemporary music scene. She further points out that Ethiopian music is not alone in shifting to electronically produced music, a point that Falceto acknowledges.

== Dance ==
There are many different types of Ethiopian dances, each unique to the diverse regions of the country. In a 1964 ethnographic study, a Hungarian sociologist visiting Ethiopia recorded one hundred and fifty variations of Ethiopian dance using videos and photos. This study postulates that Ethiopian dances can be divided into three forms: group dances, dances divided by gender, and coupled dances. In group dances, men and women gather and dance in ways that are not partnered or gender-specific. One such example is the traditional Amhara dance, eskista. Dances that have gender-specific movements include certain Oromo dances like the dances of Shewa/Tulama region in which men tend to have more stiff, jilted moves that mimic riding into war and emphasize physical power whereas women step to the same beat, but with an emphasis on technical and delicate neck movements. In most traditional Ethiopian dances, women tend to dance in ways that emphasize the movement of their neck and hair through the momentum of the bounce of their steps. Ethiopian dances usually involve short, repetitive movements of the legs, neck and shoulders. The speed and intensity of these movements varies depending on the rhythms being played. The third category of dance is the coupled dances. These dances involve partnership between a man and a woman, and often involve direct physical contact or a physical closeness that is coupled with complementary dance moves that create a sort of back and forth between the partners. One of the most popular coupled dances in Ethiopian traditional dance is the 'shagoyee' dance which originates from the Harerghe region of the Oromo ethnic group. In this dance, the male partner stands close and places his hands on the woman's shoulders and guides her from side to side, while the woman bends at the waist, twists, and fluidly swings her hair in the direction that her partner pushes her. Another popular coupled dance is called Awris, a playful traditional dance of the Tigre ethnic group. In this dance, the woman holds her arms near her chest, as if she is cradling a child, and glides around her partner while ducking and acting coy, while the partner gracefully leaps from one leg to the other and makes a motion of catching her.

As mentioned above, one of the most well-known traditional dances of Ethiopia is the eskista, a dance that originates from the Amhara ethnic group. It is a shoulder-focused dance that involves the movement of the head, chest and neck as well. The eskista is known for its distinct use of vertical, sagittal, and diagonal shoulder movements. Both men and women use similar movements in this dance, and instead of partnership often has a competitive nature in how dancers mirror each other. Traditionally, the dance has been said to mimic rattlesnake shedding its skin due to the rapid and intensely controlled shaking of the upper body. Some forms of eskista also mimic a bird-like style that emphasizes both stiff and fluid neck movements which is characteristic of the Ethiopian dances in most parts of the country. On the contrary, the southern parts of Ethiopia tend to have dances that are more focused on foot and hip movements. For example, the Gurage region is known for its dances, called Abolala after a typical vocable used in their traditional songs. These dances feature a running-like motion where the feet rapidly step in front of one another while staying in place. The Wolayta people are also known for their uniquely southern dance that focuses on the controlled toss of the waist and hips as the feet are held widely apart for a strong base. These different dances are an important part of the cultural expression of the Ethiopian people and their histories.

== Clothing ==
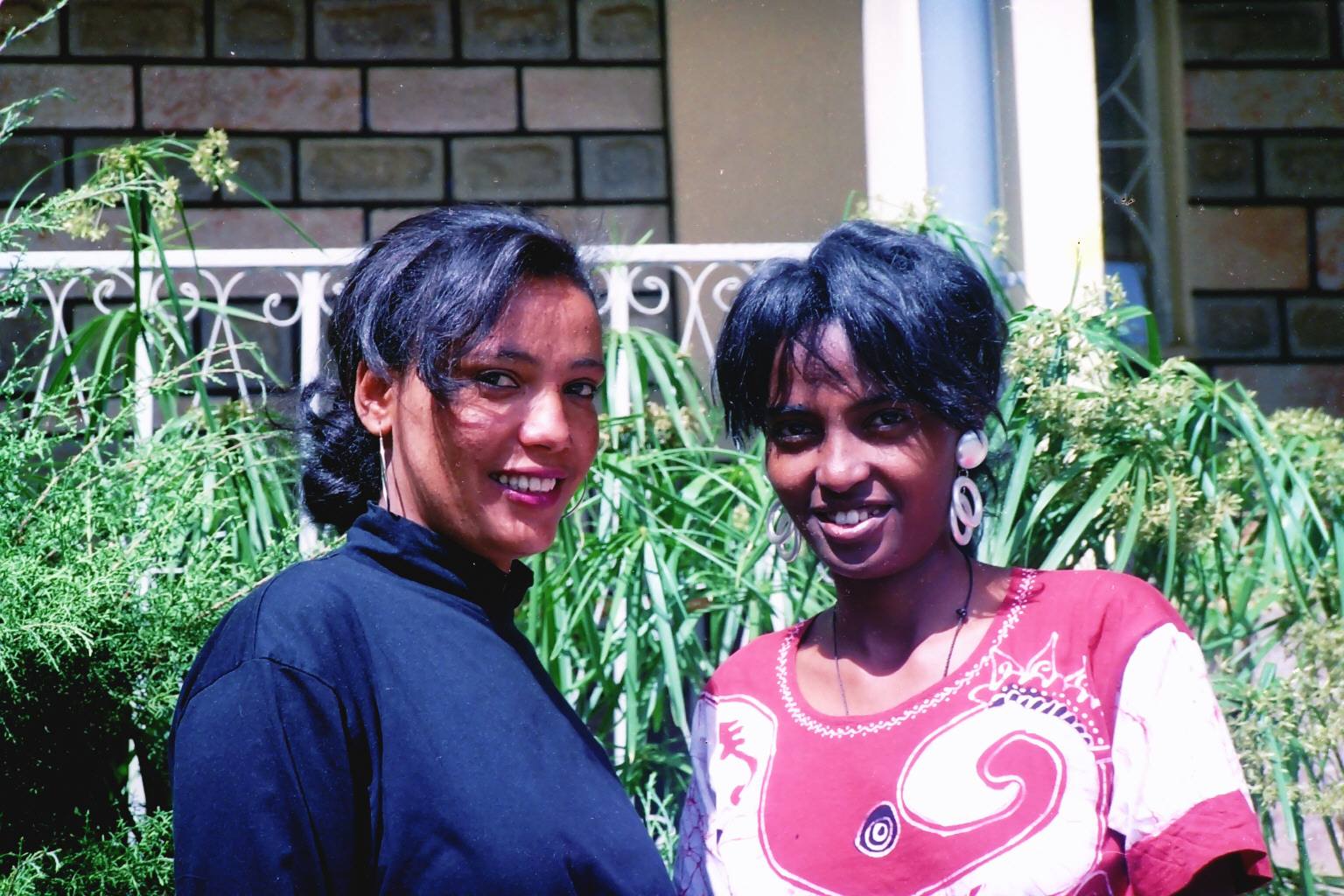
Habesha women in urban wear

In some central and northern areas, women's traditional clothes are often made from cloth called shemma. It is basically cotton cloth about 90 cm wide, woven in long strips which are then sewn together. Sometimes shiny threads are woven into the fabric for an elegant effect. It takes about two to three weeks to make enough cloth for one dress. The bottom of the garment or shirt may be ornamented with patterns.

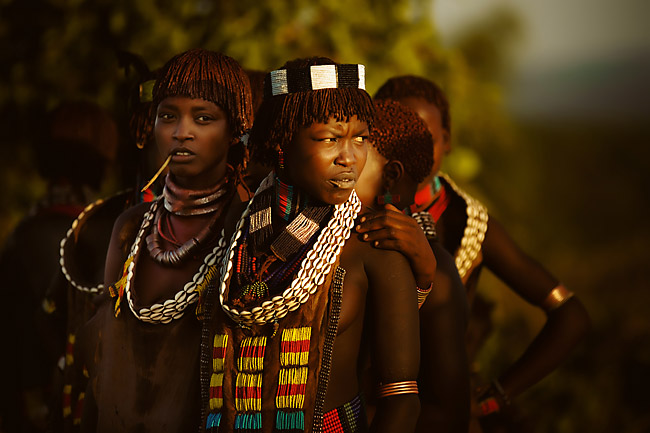
Omotic Hamar women wearing their traditional attire

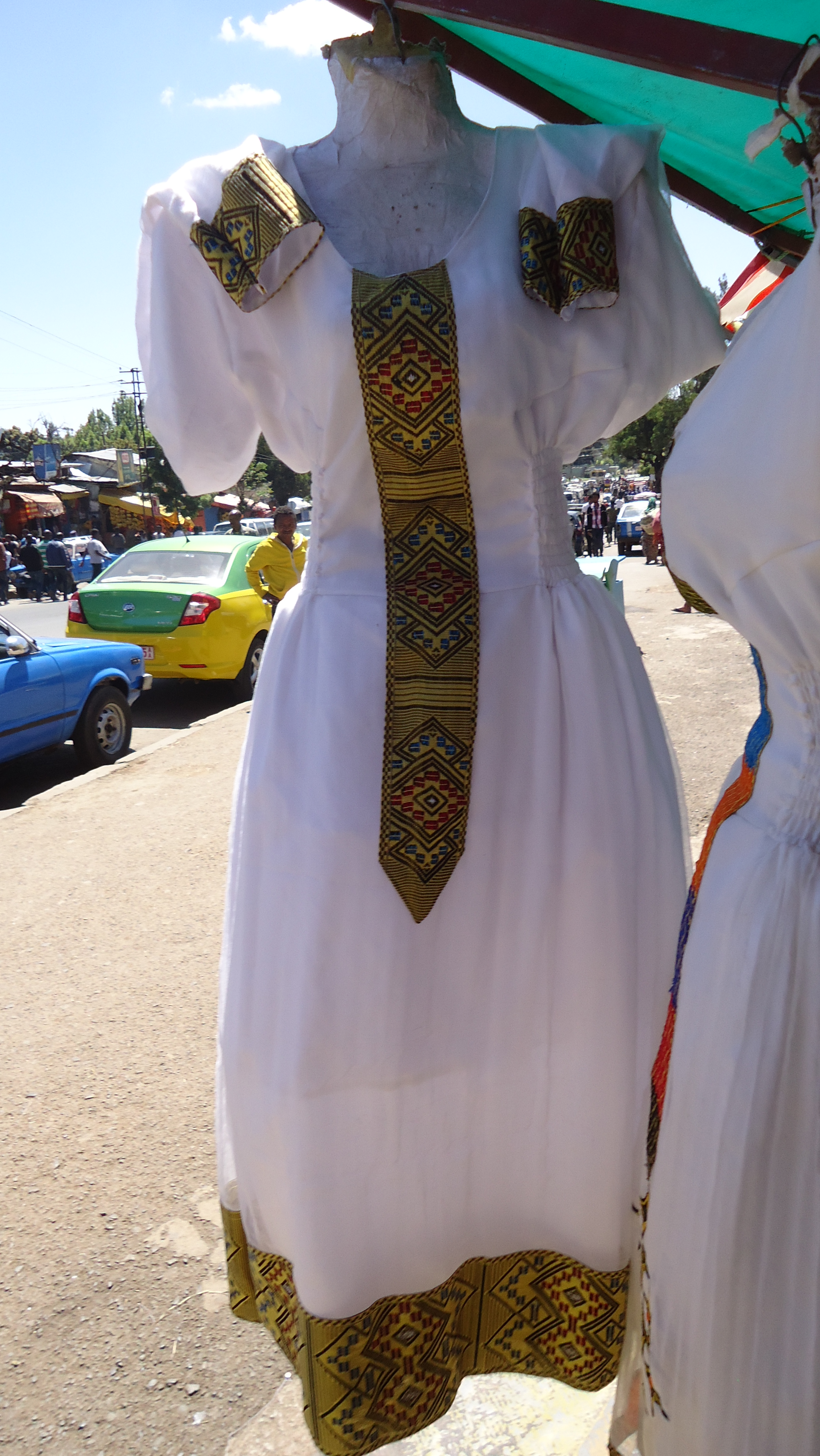

Men wear pants and a knee-length shirt with a white collar, and perhaps a sweater. They also frequently wear knee-high socks, while women might not wear socks at all. Men as well as women wear shawls, the netela. The shawls are worn in a different style for different occasions. When going to church, women cover their hair with them and pull the upper ends of the shawl about their shoulders reproducing a cross (meskelya), with the shiny threads appearing at the edge. During funerals, the shawl is worn so the shiny threads appear at the bottom (madegdeg). Women's dresses are called habesha kemis, and are often made from the shemma cloth. The dresses are usually white with some color above the lower hem. Bracelets and necklaces of silver or gold are worn on arms and feet to complete the look. A variety of designer dinner dresses combining traditional fabric with modern style are now worn by some ladies in the cities.

== Body art ==
In May 2021, a public exhibition titled The Wax and Gold of Hairstyles in Ethiopia, presenting historical photographs and modern drawings of traditional hairstyles was shown at the Addis Ababa Museum. This exhibition aims to invite the interested public to discover documentary photographs of people and their hairstyles taken by German anthropologists during their field trips to southern Ethiopia between 1934 and 1971. These photographs and their original captions had been made available by the Frobenius Institute for anthropological research of the University of Frankfurt in Germany, as well as other institutions and scholars from Ethiopia and Germany. In June 2022, the exhibition was transferred to the city of Jinka for permanent display. The photographs and accompanying information of these forms of body art in Ethiopia was also published online, with an exhibition catalog for free download.

== Ethiopian cuisine ==
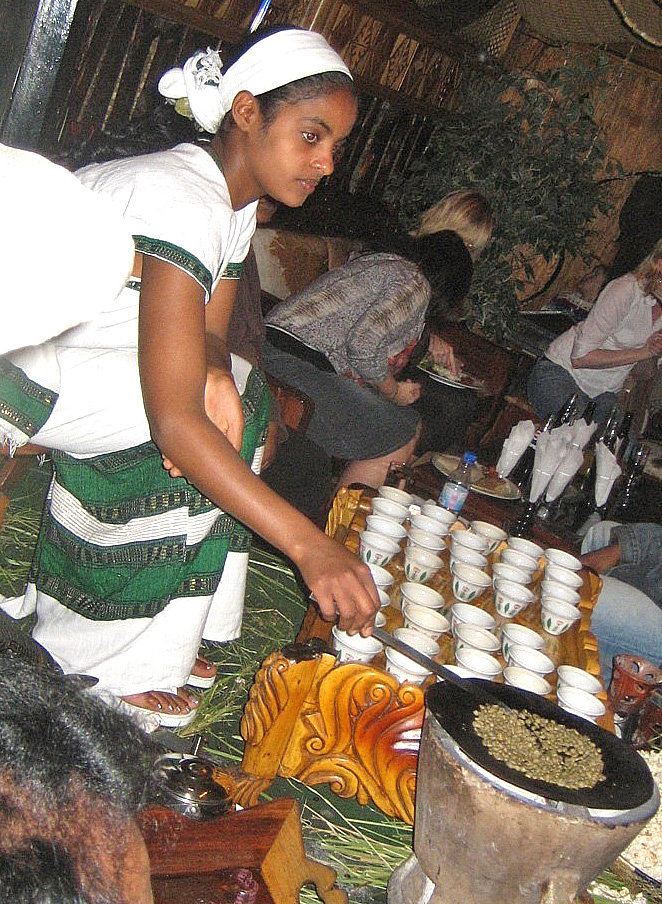
An Ethiopian woman preparing Ethiopian coffee at a traditional ceremony. She roasts, crushes and brews the coffee on the spot.

The Ethiopian cuisine consists of various vegetable or meat side dishes and entrees, often prepared as a wat or thick stew like doro wot; a very popular traditional stew made out of chicken and egg. One or more servings of wat are placed upon a piece of injera, a large sourdough flatbread, which is 50 cm (20 inches) in diameter and made out of fermented teff flour. One does not eat with utensils, but instead uses injera (always with the right hand) to scoop up the entrees and side dishes. When eating with others, Ethiopians might give a gursha, involving using your hand to grab a bite of injera and feed it to someone. Traditional Ethiopian food does not use any pork or seafood (aside from fish), as most Ethiopians have historically adhered to Islam, the Ethiopian Orthodox Church, or Judaism, all of which prohibit eating pork and shellfish. Additionally, throughout a given year, Orthodox Christians observe numerous fasts (such as Lent), during which food is prepared without any meat or dairy products. Another dish served in Ethiopia is Doro wat, which is chicken stew with hard boiled eggs.

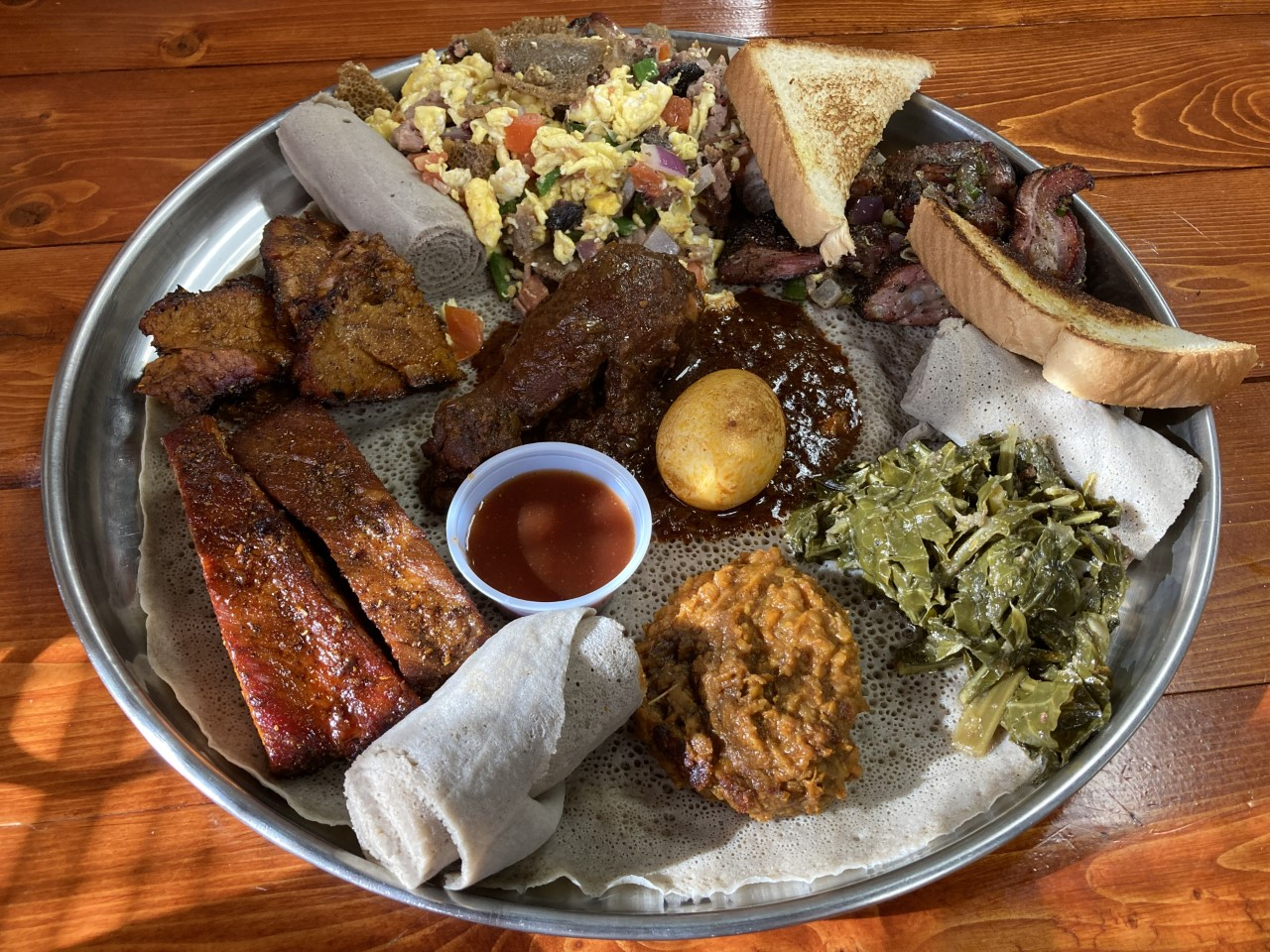
Ethiopian food prepared all in one

A common ceremony is the coffee ceremony. Unlike most countries, coffee is served during social gatherings, amongst family, friends, or neighbors. There are three rounds of coffee drinking: the first one called awol (Tigrinya: ኣዎል), the second tona (ቶና) and the third baraka (ባርካ). The tradition of coffee drinking goes back to Kaldi, a 9th century goat herder from Keffa Zone who noticed his goats were caught up in hysteria after eating a shrub that stimulated them to dance uncontrollably. After picking the shrub's berries, he was advised to show them to priests in a nearby monastery. One monk called the generosity of Kaldi "the Devil's work" and tossed the coffee berries into the fire, generating a delicious odor and leading to the birth of coffee.

== Sports ==
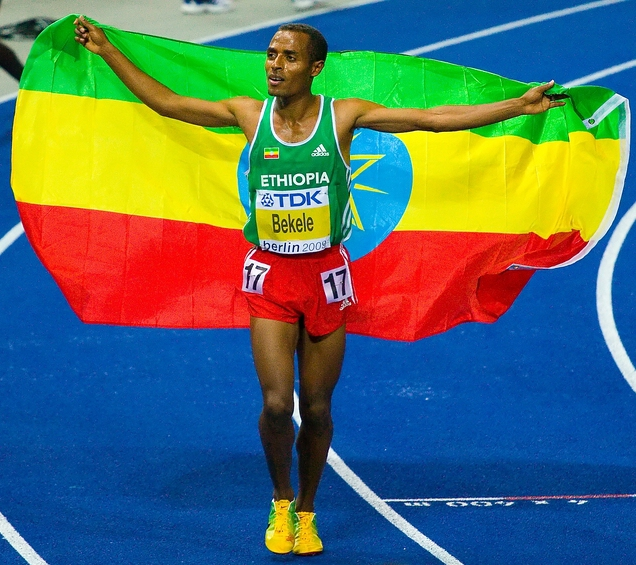
Famous Ethiopian athlete Kenenisa Bekele

Track and field is Ethiopia's most successful sport, in which they have won many medals in the Olympic Games. Football is the most popular sport in Ethiopia. Despite lack of success by the national team, it is supported by a significant part of the population.

== Media ==
Radio and television are under the control of the Ethiopian government. There are nine radio broadcast stations, eight AM and one shortwave, licensed to operate. The major radio broadcasting stations (all AM) are Radio Ethiopia, Radio Torch (pirate), Radio Voice of One Free Ethiopia, and the Voice of the Revolution of Tigray. Television viewing has increased over the years and today there are a number of channels streamed via satellite television, such as Fana TV, EBS, Gospel TV, ETV 57 (government-owned), Kana TV, OMN, DM TV, and many more. In keeping with government policy, radio broadcasts occur in a variety of languages. Print media, because of high poverty levels, low literacy rates, and poor distribution outside of the capital, serve only a small portion of the population. Major daily newspapers include Addis Zemen, the Daily Monitor, and the Ethiopian Herald. There is also a small but lively film industry.

== Language ==
Languages of Ethiopia as of 2007 Census.
1. Amharic (42.3%)
2. Oromo (20.8%)
3. Somali (6.25%)
4. Tigrinya (5.86%)
5. Sidamo (4.04%)
6. Wolaytta (2.21%)
7. Gurage (2.01%)
8. Afar (1.74%)
9. Hadiyya (1.70%)
10. Gamo (1.45%)
11. Other (11.6%)

According to Ethnologue, there are ninety individual languages spoken in Ethiopia. The majority of the population in the country speaks Amharic, the language of the Amhara people. Other regional languages, spoken by their respective ethnic include Somali, spoken by the Somali people, Tigrinya, spoken by the Tigray people, and Oromiffa, spoken by the Oromo people, Together, these four groups make up about three-quarters of Ethiopia's population. Other Afro-Asiatic languages with a significant number of speakers include the Cushitic Sidamo, Afar, Hadiyya and Agaw languages, as well as the Semitic Gurage, Harari, Silt'e and Argobba tongues.

Additionally, Omotic languages are spoken by Omotic ethnic minority groups inhabiting the southern regions. Among these idioms are Aari, Bench, Dawro, Dime, Dizi, Gamo, Gofa, Maale, Hamer and Wolaytta.

Languages from the Nilo-Saharan phylum are also spoken by the nation's Nilotic ethnic minorities, who are concentrated in the southwestern parts of the country. These tongues include Nuer, Anuak, Nyangatom, Majang, Surma, Me'en and Mursi.

English is the most widely spoken foreign language and is the medium of instruction in secondary schools. Amharic was the language of primary school instruction, but has been replaced in many areas by regional languages such as Oromiffa, Somali or Tigrinya. While all languages enjoy equal state recognition in the 1995 Constitution of Ethiopia, Amharic is recognized as the official working language of the Federal Government. The various regions of Ethiopia are free to determine their own working languages, with Oromiffa, Somali and Tigrinya recognized as official working languages in their respective regions.

In terms of writing systems, Ethiopia's principal orthography is Ge'ez or Ethiopic. Employed as an abugida for several of the country's languages, it first came into usage in the 6th and 5th centuries BC as an abjad to transcribe the Semitic Ge'ez language. Ge'ez now serves as the liturgical language of the Ethiopian and Eritrean Orthodox Churches. Unlike other regional languages, Amharic stands out as the sole language in the country with its own distinct alphabet and writing system, rooted in the ancient Ge'ez script.

== Philosophy ==
Ethiopian philosophy has been prolific since ancient times, though offset by Greek and Patristic philosophy. The best known philosophical revival was in the early modern period figures such as Zera Yacob (1599–1692) and his student Walda Heywat, who wrote Hatata (Inquiry) in 1667 as an argument of existence of God.

== Literature ==
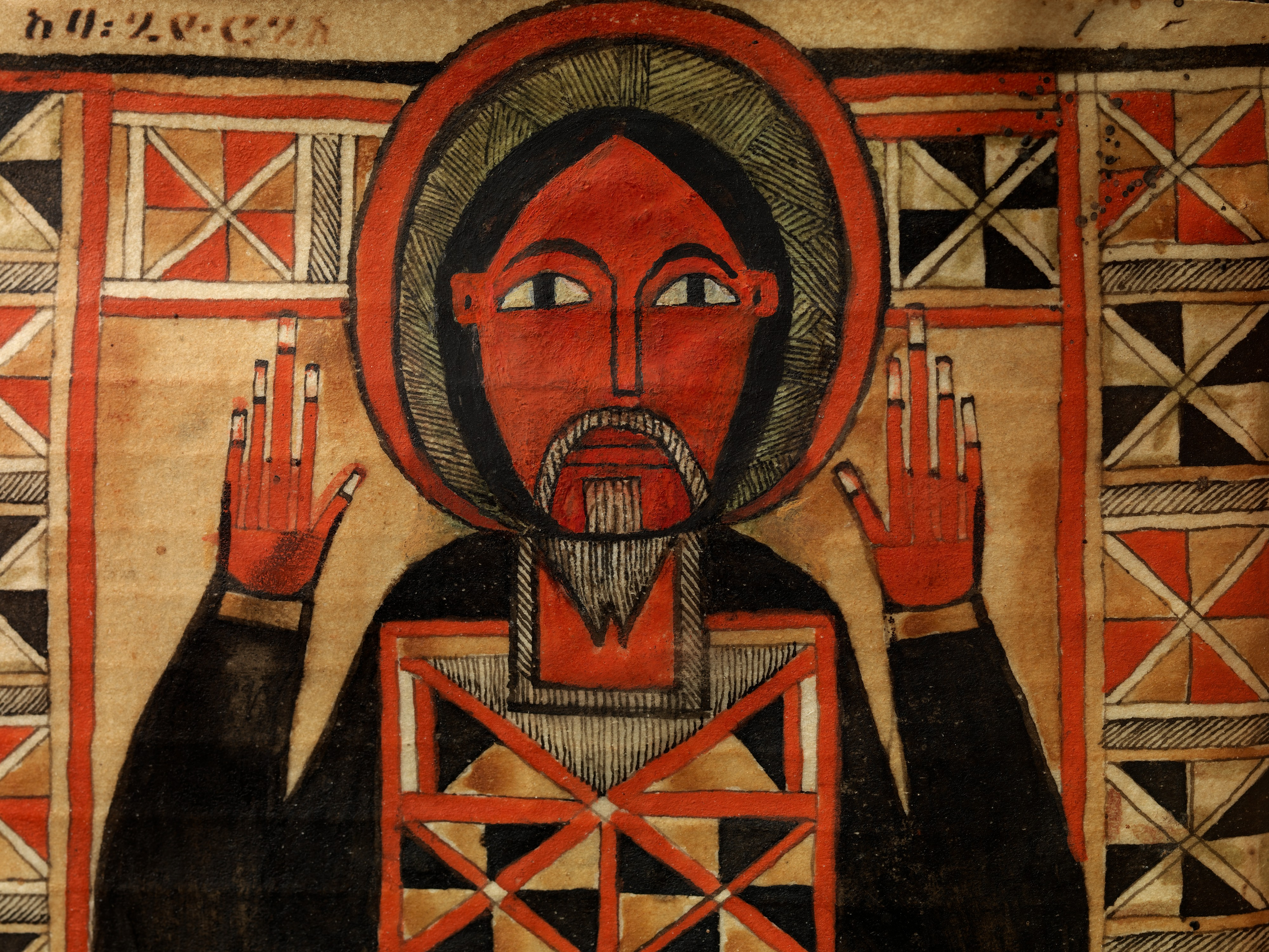
Giyorgis of Segla, prolific religious author in the Late Middle Ages

Ethiopian literature traces back to the Aksumite period in the 4th century, most of which are religious motifs. In royal inscription, they employed both Ge'ez and Greek language, but the latter was dismissed in 350 and the Amharic language rose up. Unlike most Sub-Saharan African countries, Ethiopia has ancient distinct languages, Ge'ez and Amharic which dominated political and educational aspects. In spite of the current political instability in the country instigates endangering cultural heritage of these works, some improvements are made for preservation in recent years.

The Ethiopian literary works mostly consisted of handwritten codex (branna, or ብራና in Amharic). It is prepared by gathering parchment leaves and sewing to stick together. The codex size varies depending on volumes and preparation. Another notable writing book is a protective scroll, serving as written amulet. Some of these were intended for magical purposes, for example ketab is used for magical defence. Scrolls typically produced by debtera, non-ordained clergy experts on exorcism and healings.

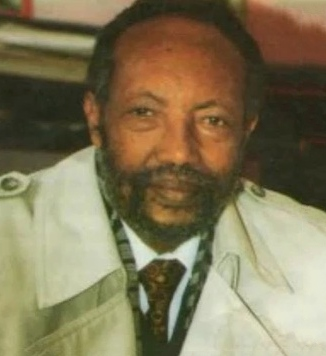
Tsegaye Gebre-Medhin in 1980s

In Ethiopian poetry, most poets recount past events, social unrests, poverty and famine. Qene is the most used element of Ethiopian poetry – regarded as a form of Amharic poetry, though the term generally refers to any poems. The most notable poets are Tsegaye Gebre-Medhin, Kebede Michael and Mengistu Lemma.

== Creative Futures ==
In November 2016, a two-year programme funded by the European Union called the Creative Futures project was implemented by partners the British Council, Goethe-Institut, and iceaddis ("Ethiopia's first creative business hub"), was launched. with the aim of investing in Ethiopia's creative economy and provide skills to young people that improve their ability to be employed and lead a productive life.

The programme first offered the following: "Creative Hustles", a knowledge-sharing and networking events for creatives in all fields. opportunity for creative practitioners

- Business and marketing skills course, designed for artists.
- Event management course
- Innovation month, a series of workshops for artists
- International development programme, providing the opportunity to build partnerships with international arts practitioners and showcases
- Business engagement programme, providing activities that introduce business leaders to artists and help engage with one another

One of the focus areas of Creative Futures is fashion. Fashion Africa 254 collaborated with the British Council and its partners to create the Creative Futures Contest, "Talented Ethiopian Designers Go International". Creative Futures announced fashion designer and entrepreneur Mahlet Afework as the winner of the competition.

In 2021, a second round of Creative Futures was announced. Artists from many disciplines, including photography, filmmaking, fashion design, architecture, graphics design, animation, game, app or software development, visual arts, digital arts, crafts, sculptor and or pottery were able to participate. In a month of innovation from February to March, participants were provided a free-to-use fully-equipped working space as well as support by mentors The Urban Center in Addis Ababa. Art projects were produced by the participants, five of whom were announced winners of an award worth 100,000 birr to develop their projects.

== Religion ==
About 63% of the population adhere to Christianity. About 34% of the population are Muslim, with other religions covering another 3%. In terms of faiths, Christianity (63%) and Islam (30%) are the two dominant religious affiliations in SSA.

== Gender roles ==
In rural and urban Ethiopia, the senior male of the household has the majority of authority. Men in the country side are in charge of tasks such as plowing, trading, building, and harvesting. Women are more responsible for the domestic labor of the household such as cooking, collecting goods, and caring for the household. It is also not unusual to see women helping men with some tasks in the countryside. In the urban areas, traditional gender roles are less common, but the women are, more often than not, still in charge of domestic labor. In Ethiopia education is still stressed more for boys compared to girls and also given more leeway to social activities over girls, though enrollment rate for girls in education is on the rise.

== Holidays ==
There are a number of public holidays in Ethiopia. Among these holidays are Easter and Christmas.

== See also ==
- Architecture of Ethiopia
- Ethiopian chant
- Ethiopian Studies
- Wedding customs in Ethiopia
