= Giusto da Urbino =

Italian missionary (1814–1856)

Giusto's handwriting in a copy of the Hatata of Zar'a Ya'eqob

Giusto da Urbino (30 August 1814 – 22 November 1856), known in Ge'ez as Abba Yostos, was an Italian Capuchin missionary to Ethiopia and a linguist.

== Life ==
Giusto was born in Matraia to Giuseppe and Teresa Scolastica Guidi. His baptismal name was Giovanni Iacopo, although he is often called Jacopo Curtopassi (or Cortopassi), this stems from confusion with his grandfather, Iacopo Cortopassi di Matraja. He joined the Capuchins at the age of sixteen after the death of a girl he loved. His uncle, Francesco da Urbino, was the master provincial of the Marche. He passed his novitiate at Cingoli under Giusto Recanati, his spiritual mentor for the rest of his life. He said his vows on 28 August 1832.

Giusto was sent to preach in Cagli, Urbania and Fossombrone. He studied philosophy at Pesaro. He began a correspondence with Costantino Nascimbeni di Piobbico that would last until his death and is an important source for his biography. In 1845, he chose to become a missionary and was sent to Rome for training. There he learned French and Arabic. Passing up an opportunity to go to India, he chose to join the mission to the Galla under Guglielmo Massaia, which sailed from Civitavecchia on 14 May 1846.

Settling down in the monastery of Tadbaba Maryam, Giusto soon became proficient in both Amharic and Ge'ez. Disillusioned with Italy after the failure of Vincenzo Gioberti's programme in 1848, Giusto gradually adopted Ethiopia as his homeland. In 1851, he retreated to the monastery of Bietlehem near Debre Tabor in the face of opposition from the Orthodox clergy. In 1854, he refused Massaia's requests to become his coadjutor.

Giusto was expelled from Ethiopia by Emperor Theodore II on 26 April 1855. From Cairo on 2 August, he dispatched to Rome a plan to rescue Massaia. In April 1856, he headed back to Ethiopia. He caught a fever while crossing the Sudan and died in Khartoum.

== Works ==
Besides his letters, Giusto wrote a grammar of Ge'ez, some poems in Ge'ez, a French–Ge'ez–Amharic dictionary and a Latin–Ge'ez–Amharic dictionary. The Latin dictionary survives in manuscript, the French one he sent to Antoine d'Abbadie, who used it for his own dictionary of Amharic. At the request of Massai, Giusto translated François Bourgade's Les soirées de Carthage (1847) into Ge'ez and Amharic. In 1856, the Spettatore egiziano, an Italian periodical in Cairo, published in three parts his Vicende politiche e religiose in Abissinia dopo il 1852, an account of recent political and religious events in Ethiopia. Seven manuscripts of Giusto's writings are preserved in libraries in Europe.

Giusto's most famous works are two copies he made of the Hatata of Zar'a Ya'eqob and its appendix, the Hatata of Walda Heywat. He sent these manuscripts to d'Abbadie. The claim that they are authentic 17th-century Ge'ez works has been debated for over a century with some scholars arguing that they are in fact the original works of Giusto da Urbino. Others believe that Giusto used traditional material to compile them. In either event, the works, while inauthentic, are not forgeries but simply pseudonymous.

Giusto sent a total of 24 manuscripts to d'Abbadie, for which he was paid. They are currently shelfmarks D'Abbadie 194–217 and 234 in the Bibliothèque nationale in Paris.

== Bibliography ==
- Belcher, Wendy Laura (2024). "The Authorship of the Hatata Inquiries". In Ralph Lee; Mehari Zemelak Worku; Wendy Laura Belcher (eds.). The Hatata Inquiries: Two Texts of Seventeenth-Century African Philosophy from Ethiopia about Reason, the Creator, and Our Ethical Responsibilities. De Gruyter. pp. 17–54. doi:10.1515/9783110781922-003.
- Cantor, Lea; Egid, Jonathan; Merawi, Fasil, eds. (2024). In Search of Zär’a Ya‛ǝqob: On the History, Philosophy, and Authorship of the Ḥatäta Zär’a Ya‛ǝqob and the Ḥatäta Wäldä Ḥəywät. De Gruyter. doi:10.1515/9783110725810.
- Marenbon, John (2024). "Zär'a Ya‛ǝqob, Mediaeval Philosophy, Forgery, and Authenticity". In Lea Cantor; Jonathan Egid; Fasil Merawi (eds.). In Search of Zär’a Ya‛ǝqob: On the History, Philosophy, and Authorship of the Ḥatäta Zär’a Ya‛ǝqob and the Ḥatäta Wäldä Ḥəywät. De Gruyter. pp. 105–120. doi:10.1515/9783110725810-006.
- Pizzorusso, Giovanni (2001). "Giusto da Urbino". Dizionario Biografico degli Italiani (in Italian). Vol. 57: Giulini–Gonzaga. Rome: Istituto dell'Enciclopedia Italiana. ISBN 978-88-12-00032-6.
- Wion, Anaïs (2021) [2013]. "The History of a Genuine Fake Philosophical Treatise (Ḥatatā Zar'a Yā'eqob and Ḥatatā Walda Ḥeywat). Episode 1: The Time of Discovery. From Being Part of a Collection to Becoming a Scholarly Publication (1852–1904)". Afriques. Translated by Lea Cantor, Jonathan Egid and Anaïs Wion.
- Zara Yaqob; Walda Heywat (2024). Ralph Lee; Mehari Zemelak Worku; Wendy Laura Belcher (eds.). The Hatata Inquiries: Two Texts of Seventeenth-Century African Philosophy from Ethiopia about Reason, the Creator, and Our Ethical Responsibilities. De Gruyter. doi:10.1515/9783110781922.
