= Abate Mekuria =

Ethiopian director and playwright

- አባተ መኩሪያ
- Born: 1944; Addis Ababa, Ethiopian Empire
- Died: 20 July 2016 (aged 71–72); Addis Ababa, Ethiopia
- Occupations: Film, television and theatre director and producer, playwright, choreographer
- Known for: Amharic adaptations of Shakespeare

Abate Mekuria (Amharic: አባተ መኩሪያ; 1944 – 20 July 2016) was an Ethiopian director, playwright, choreographer, and producer of shows for television, film and theatre.

== Early life ==
Abate was born in Addis Ababa. He attended the then Haile Selassie University, where he majored in English and minored in Theatre during the 1960s.

== Career ==
Abate Mekuria began his career working with American playwright and director Philip Caplan, who collaborated with several major contemporary Ethiopian playwrights and actors such as Tesfaye Gessesse, Debebe Seifu and Wogayehu Negatu. Abate advanced his studies in theatre in Glasgow in the mid-1960s, and film in Germany in 1969-1970 before pursuing a Directing course in London.

Best known for his Shakespearean plays translated into Amharic, including adaptations of Macbeth, Othello, and Hamlet, Abate had a knack for making larger than life productions and complex plays. Dubbed the ‘King of Ethiopian Opera’ Abate Mekuria found his passion melding music and theatre.

From 1976, in the capacity as director at the Ethiopian National Theatre until the 1991 revolution, Abate worked closely with Tsegaye Gabre-Medhin, who for years almost exclusively wrote plays that Abate would direct. Abate's talent would transform Tsegaye's long (and sometimes boring) monologues into captivating drama.

In 1990 he penned and directed The Shoe Shine Boys opera, which dealt with contemporary social issues of Ethiopia's lower classes, this would lead to government pressure, who viewed the play tarnished its image.

== Legacy ==
Abate Mekuria died on July 20, 2016, in Addis Ababa Hiwot Hospital due to prostate cancer.

"If I was to name three people in Ethiopian Theatre history, surely one of them would be Abate Mekuria" — Abebe Balcha, Actor from the TV series Sew Lesew, .

== List of plays ==
- Haltu Be Sidist Wer (1966)
- Othello (1973)
- Hamus (1978)
- Epides Negus (1988)
- Be Hamle Chereka Guzo (1996)
- Afageshign (2003)
