= Tesfaye Gessesse =

Ethiopian stage and film actor (1937–2020)

- ተስፋዬ ገሰሰ
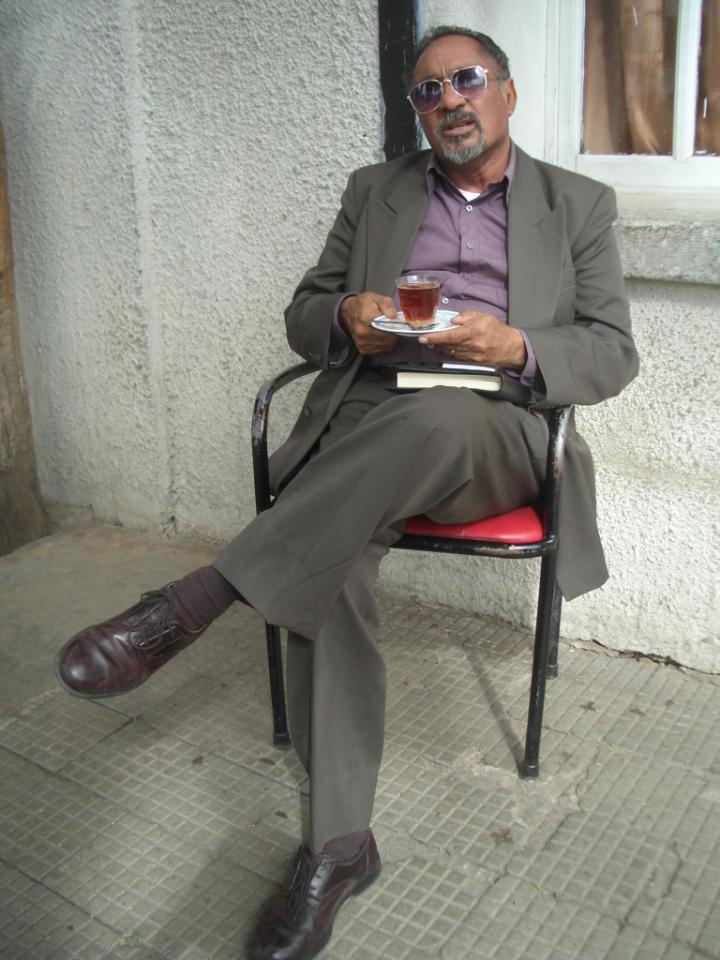
- Tesfaye Gessesse in April 2006
- Born: 27 September 1937; Somalia Governorate, Italian East Africa (now Somali Region, Ethiopia)
- Died: 16 December 2020 (aged 83); Addis Ababa, Ethiopia
- Education: Haile Selassie I University
- Occupations: Actor; Director; Theatre manager; Playwright
- Years active: 1950s–2020
- Title: Director of Hager Fikir Theatre (1974); Director of National Theatre (1976)

Tesfaye Gessesse (Amharic: ተስፋዬ ገሰሰ; 27 September 1937 – 16 December 2020) was an Ethiopian stage and film actor regarded as one of the most important exponents of Ethiopian modern theatre. During a career that spanned 40 years, he was an actor, director, and theatre administrator. He wrote and directed several plays which have a great relevance in the modern history of Ethiopian culture.

== Biography ==
Gessesse was born on 27 September 1937 in Guro Gutu in Hararghe state, in eastern Ethiopia. He started his theatre career in the 1950s as a young university student. His promise got him a scholarship at Northwestern University's theater school, in Evanston, Illinois, where he studied in the late 1950s.(Plastow, 94)

On returning to Ethiopia, he was a part of a small group of reformers, who in the 1960s turned theatre from an art form aimed at propagandizing for the aristocracy into a means for examining the political and social situation in Ethiopia. In 1960, he became associated with the Haile Selassie I theatre, which had been initially founded by Emperor Haile Selassie, primarily for his own entertainment, but whose direction was being changed to focus on everyday concerns by newly appointed director Tsegaye Gebre-Medhin and gained acclaim as a director. His early work Yeshi depicts the corruption of urban life, typified by its titular character, a prostitute who destroys the life of her lover.(Plastow, 96-98)

He became the General Director of Hager Fikir Theatre in 1974. In 1975, he was suspended and sent to prison by the newly installed Derg government after his play Iqaw which criticized state terrorism.

In 1976, Tsegaye, who had become the Director of the National Theatre in Addis Ababa was removed after demonstrations by theater workers. Gessesse was named the new Director.(Plastow, p154). His work continued to cause controversy as with his direction of Tsere Kolonialist as well as his own play, Tehaddiso (Renaissance), both of which deviated from the regime's preference for serious-minded realism. As Derg's hold tightened, its tolerance for these deviations lessened. Gessesse was fired from his post in 1979.(Plastow, 160-162) However, his fame allowed him a certain amount of leeway, which allowed him to be one of a few playwrights able to mount politically sensitive productions into the 1980s. His plays Cherchez Les Femmes' (1980) and Ferdu Leinante (The Judgement is for you, 1984) examined the use of fear as a means of control without directly criticizing the regime. (Plastow 224-225)

Gessesse died on 16 December 2020, at the age of 83 from COVID-19.
