= Etsubdink Legesse =

Ethiopian artist (born 20th century)

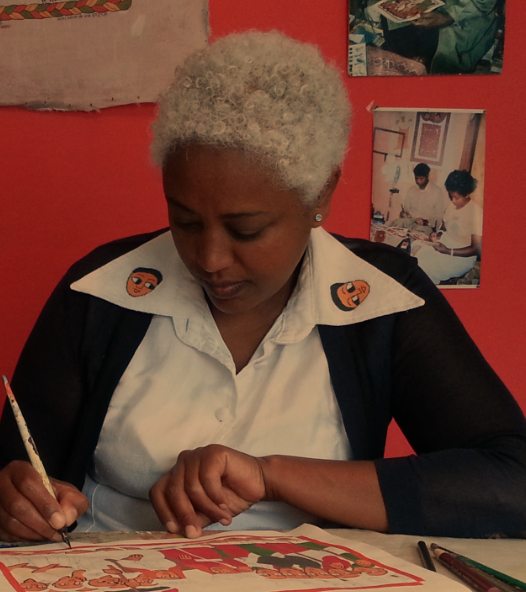
Etsubdink Legesse, working on her art

Etsubdink Legesse (born 20th century) is an Ethiopian artist, known for her traditional paintings on parchment. Her work often depicts Ethiopian culture's stories and figures.

== Early life ==
Born in Addis Ababa, Ethiopia, Etsubdink Legesse completed her education in accounting and initially pursued a career in that field. However, Legesse began assisting her father, Aba Legesse Mengistu, a renowned traditional painter, while maintaining her accounting profession.

== Artistic style ==
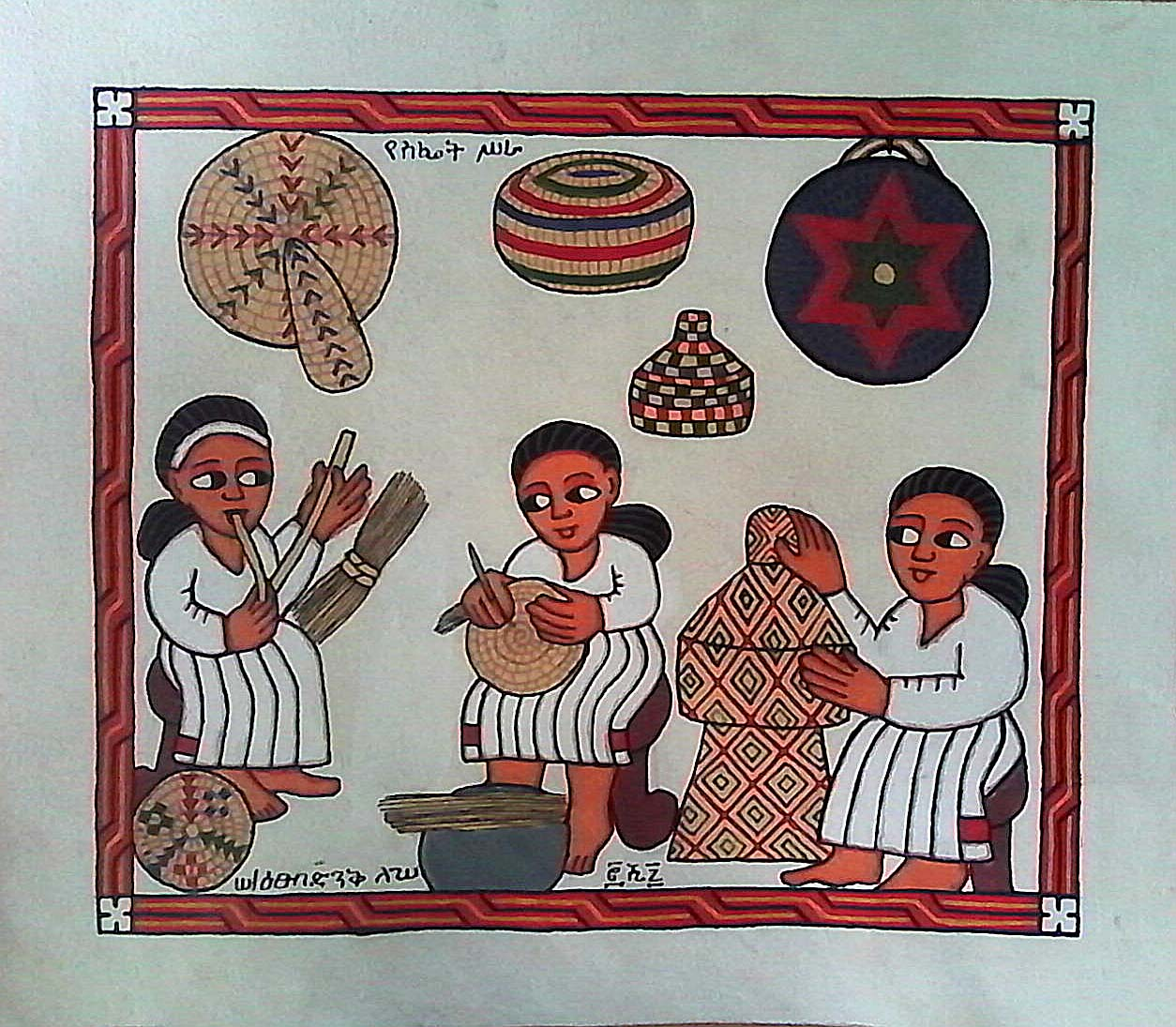
Traditional work "Sifet"

Legesse's paintings are characterized by vibrant colors and a connection to Ethiopian heritage.

== Media recognition ==
Legesse has been featured in interviews on national television channels and radio broadcasts. She has also participated in art exhibitions, and her paintings have been displayed in cultural institutions, galleries, churches, and hotels in Ethiopia.
