= Gessesse =

Gessesse is a surname. Notable people with the surname include:

- Tesfaye Gessesse (1936–2020), Ethiopian actor
- Tilahun Gessesse (1940–2009), Ethiopian singer
