= Qene =

Improvised oral poetry from Ethiopia

Qene (Amharic: ቅኔ, romanized: qəne) is a genre of improvised oral poetry from the historical Amhara province of Ethiopia. The genre developed in the Ethiopian Orthodox Tewahedo Church, which historically provided traditional religious education, including the composition of qene. Its origins are supposed to date back to the 14th century.

== Elements ==
=== Semena Werq (ሰምና ወርቅ) ===
The defining characteristic of qene is a literary device known as semena werq (Amharic: ሰምና ወርቅ, romanized: säməna wärq, lit. 'wax and gold'), which uses ambiguity to layer hidden meanings within the text; the term refers to an obvious meaning (the wax) above a deeper meaning (the gold). In the process of goldsmithing, a clay cast is made around wax, after which the wax is drained and molten gold is poured into the cast. This device is similar to a double entendre, and is predicated on multiple meanings of individual words or sentences.

=== Wista weira (ውስጥ ወይራ) ===
Wista weira (Amharic: ውስጥ ወይራ, romanized: wəsṭə wäyra, lit. 'inside the olive') is a literary device similar to sem-ena-werq, though less common. While it also uses ambiguity to provide hidden meanings, its ambiguity comes from interpretation of the qene as a whole, rather than words or sentences.

== History ==
=== Origin claims ===
The earliest forms are from the Amhara Region, and have been attributed to Tawanay of Gojjam, who is lived in the 14th century and founded the famous Qene school of Gonj. Other church traditions claim it goes further back to St Yared, a 6th-century Aksumite composer.

=== Earliest documentation ===
The earliest specimens of qene extant date back to the late 15th century to the reign of Emperor Eskender (1478–94).

=== Qene schools ===
Qene has long been associated with the culture and tradition of the Amhara people, and it was originally composed in Ge'ez in its earliest form. The first qene schools were in the Amhara region, such as the sacred monasteries of Gonj and Washara in Gojjam, various sites in Gondar, Sayint in Wollo and the Wadla monastery in Lasta. The rules and style of qene were historically taught as part of religious education in the Ethiopian Orthodox Church, in the level of schooling known as qene bet (“house of poetry”).

Well-known modern Ethiopian poets include Tsegaye Gabre-Medhin, Kebede Michael, and Mengistu Lemma.

== Themes ==
Sem-ena-werq in religious qene represents the theological dualism of Miaphysitism of the Oriental Orthodox Churches. These poems were composed for religious events and church activities. Secular qene was historically used to subtly insult and criticize those in positions of authority.

== See also ==
- Ethiopian literature
