= Nekash =

Ethiopian theatrical drama

Nekash (Ge'ez: ነቃሽ, lit. 'The witness or the references') is an Ethiopian theatrical drama which was firstly seen on 3 April 1991 in Addis Ababa Municipal Culture and Theater Hall. It is written by Yohannes Birhanu, directed by Tefera Worku and produced by Tesfa ye Kine-tibeb Enterprise. Nekash is returned to the stage of Hager Fikir Theatre after 28 years on 10 April 2019.

== Synopsis ==
Nekash glimpse the evil doings in the health centers. Its central focuses on the cruel personnel who uses the career for an evil purpose and discouraging them. It exposes the corruption in the supply of medicine, body market, and robbery.

== Casts ==
- Fantu Mandoye
- Alazar Samuel
- Firehwote Bahiru
- Abirar Abdo
- Debesh Temesgen
- Bayush Alemayehu
- Solomon Hagos
- Shimelis Legas and 15 others
