= Emfraz =

- Town
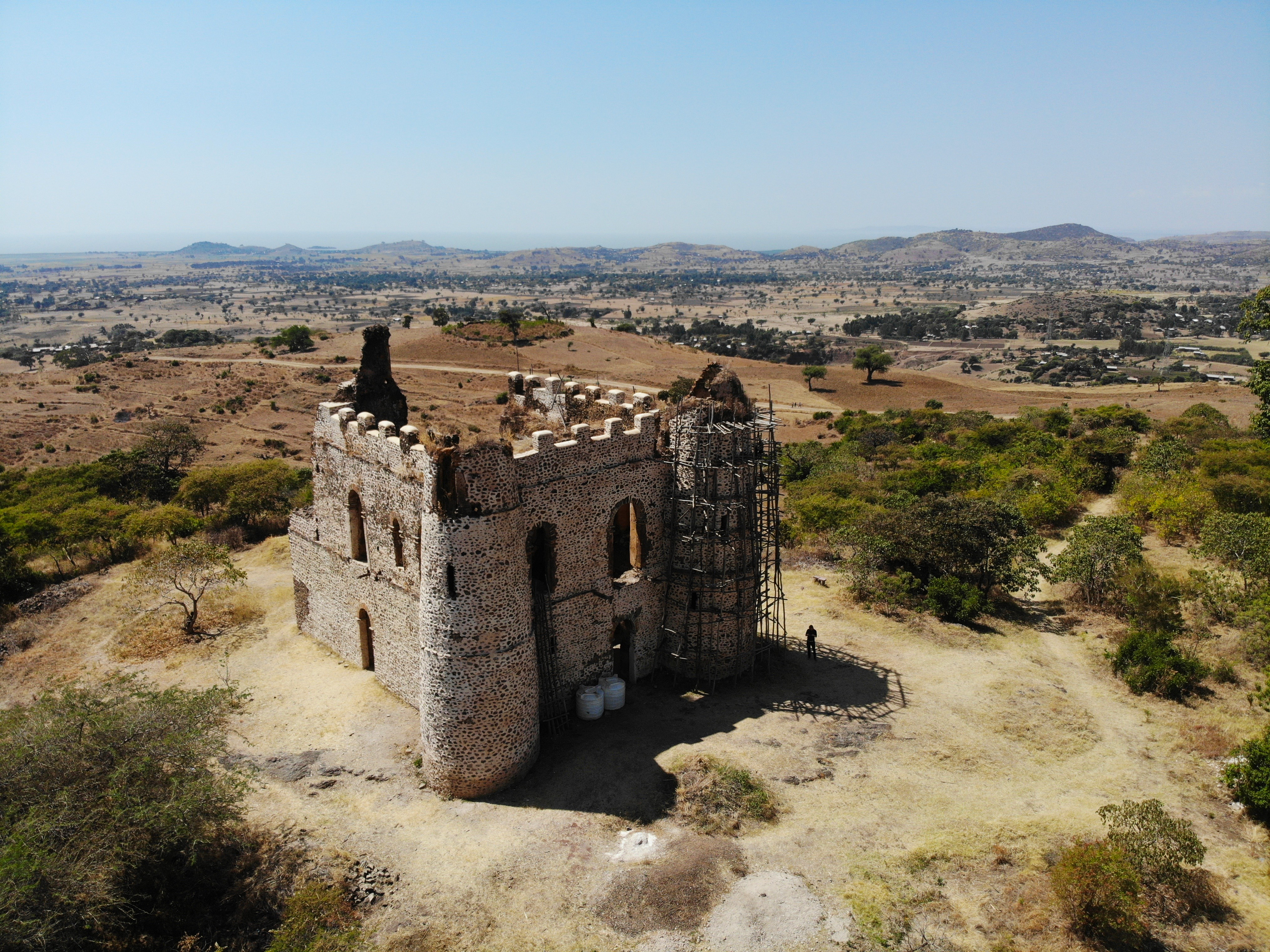
- Guzara Castle

- Location in Ethiopia
- Coordinates: 12°15′30″N 37°37′45″E
- Country: Ethiopia
- Region: Amhara
- Zone: North Gondar

Population (2005 est.)
  - Total: 9,162
- Time zone: UTC+3 (EAT)

Emfraz or Infraz (Amharic: እንፍራዝ, romanized: infrāz), also called Guba'e (Ge'ez: ጉባኤ, romanized: gūbā'ē, lit. 'assembly'), or Guzara (Amharic: ጉዛራ) is a historic town and district in northern Ethiopia. Located in the mountainous area overlooking the northeast shore of Lake Tana in the North Gondar Zone of the Amhara Region, it sits at a latitude and longitude of 12°15′30″N 37°37′45″E.

Emfraz is located on the all-weather asphalt road which connects Bahir Dar to Gondar. With improvements to this road and the advent of electrical service, since 2005 Emfraz has become an important market center for fish from Lake Tana.

== History ==
The earliest notice of Emfraz was in the 14th century, when Gebre Iyasu, a disciple of Ewostatewos, founded a monastery there. Imam Ahmad ibn Ibrahim al-Ghazi camped there during the rainy season of 1543, after he defeated Cristovão da Gama at the Battle of Wofla. The Emperor Menas later used it as his camp during the rainy season of 1559, and thereafter it was favored as an administrative center by the succeeding Emperors: Sarsa Dengel spent the rainy season there three times between 1571 and 1580, then every rainy season for four years beginning with 1585, eventually building a stone castle there, possibly modelled on the Ottoman fort at Debarwa. The 17th century philosipher Zera Yacob settled there on his way to Shewa in order to escape imperial authority after Atse Susenyos converted to catholicism and ordered his subjects to do the same. He found a patron, a rich merchant named Habta Egziabher (known as Habtu), and married a maid of the family. Yacob became the teacher of Habtu's two sons, including Walda Heywat, after which he lived a fulfilled family life in Emfraz and remained there until his death.

Despite the move of the capital to Gondar, Emfraz still retained some importance in the following years. When the European traveler Charles Jacques Poncet visited the town around 1700, he compared it favorably to Gondar. He describes how it was an important marketplace for slaves and civet, favored by Ethiopian Muslims because there they could openly practice their religion, unlike in Gondar. The Emperor Tewoflos held his coronation in Emfraz a few years later.

While over the next fifty years Emfraz declined in importance when James Bruce visited the town he remarked on its trade in blue Surat cloth.

Records at the Nordic Africa Institute website records that by 1967 the Ethiopian Telecommunications Company had a pay telephone station in this town, but no telephone subscribers.

== Demographics ==
Based on figures from the Central Statistical Agency in 2005, Emfraz has an estimated total population of 9,162, of whom 4,375 were males and 4,787 were females. The 1994 census reported this town had a total population of 5,302 of whom 2,302 were males and 3,000 were females. It is one of four towns in Gondar Zuria woreda.

== Gallery ==
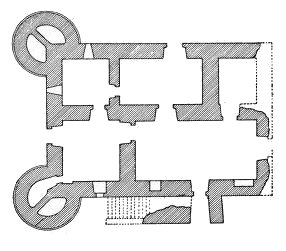
Layout of the Guzara palace from "I Castelli di Gondar," Monti della Corte (1938)

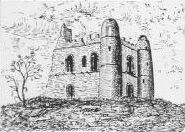
The castles of Gonder, p. 148

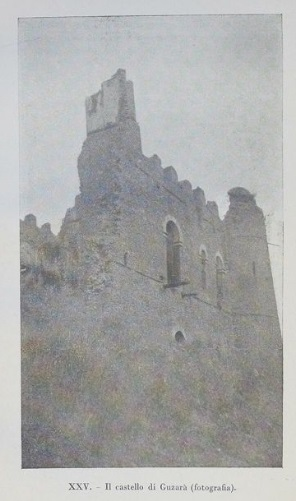
Image from "Stories, legends, and fables from the land of the negus" 1936

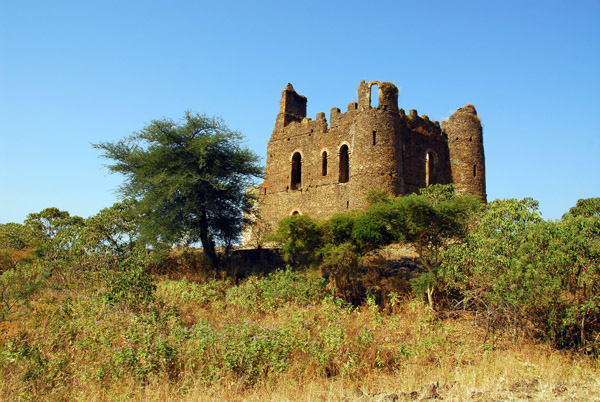
Amateur photograph
