= Claude Sumner =

Canadian professor of philosophy

Claude Sumner, SJ (1919–2012) was a Canadian professor of philosophy who worked at Addis Ababa University from 1953. He was best known for his work on Zera Yacob.

Sumner died on June 24, 2012, in Montreal, Canada, at the age of 92.

== Bibliography ==
- The Philosophy of Man, Vol. I: From the Upanisads to the British Empiricists, University College Press, 1973.
- The Philosophy of Man, Vol. II: From Kant to the Situation in 1963, Central Printing Press, 1974.
- Ethiopian Philosophy, vol. I: The Book of the Wise Philosophers, Commercial Printing Press, 1974.
- Ethiopian Philosophy, vol. II: The Treatise of Zara Yaecob and Walda Hewat: Text and Authorship, Commercial Printing Press, 1976.
- Ethiopian Philosophy, vol. III: The Treatise of Zara Yaecob and Walda Hewat: An Analysis, Commercial Printing Press, 1978.
- Ethiopian Philosophy, vol. IV: The Life and Maxims of Skandes, Commercial Printing Press, 1974.
- Ethiopian Philosophy, vol. V: The Fisalgwos, Commercial Printing Press, 1976.
- Classical Ethiopian Philosophy, Commercial Printing Press, 1985.
- The Source of African Philosophy: The Ethiopian Philosophy of Man, Steiner Verlag Wiesbaden, 1986.
- Oromo Wisdom Literature: Proverbs, Collection and Analysis, 1995.
- "Zera Yacob", in Arrington, ed, A Companion to the Philosophers, Blackwell, 1999.
- Proverbs, Songs, Folktales: An Anthology of Oromo Literature, Gudina Tumsa Foundation, Addis Ababa, 1996.
- Living Springs of Wisdom and Philosophy, Addis Ababa University, 1999.
- "The Proverb and Oral Society", New Political Science, 21(1):11–31, 1999.
- "The Significance of Zera Yacob's Philosophy", Ultimate Reality and Meaning, 22(3):172–88, 1999.
- "The Significance of Ethiopian Philosophy for the Problematics of an African Philosophy", in Perspectives in African philosophy, Addis Ababa University, 2002.
- "The Light and the Shadow: Zera Yacob and Walda Heywat: Two Ethiopian Philosophers of the Seventeenth Century", in Wiredu and Abraham, eds., A Companion to African Philosophy, 2004.
