= Hager Fikir Theatre =

Theatre in Addis Ababa, Ethiopia

- ሃገር ፍቅር ቲያትር (Amharic)
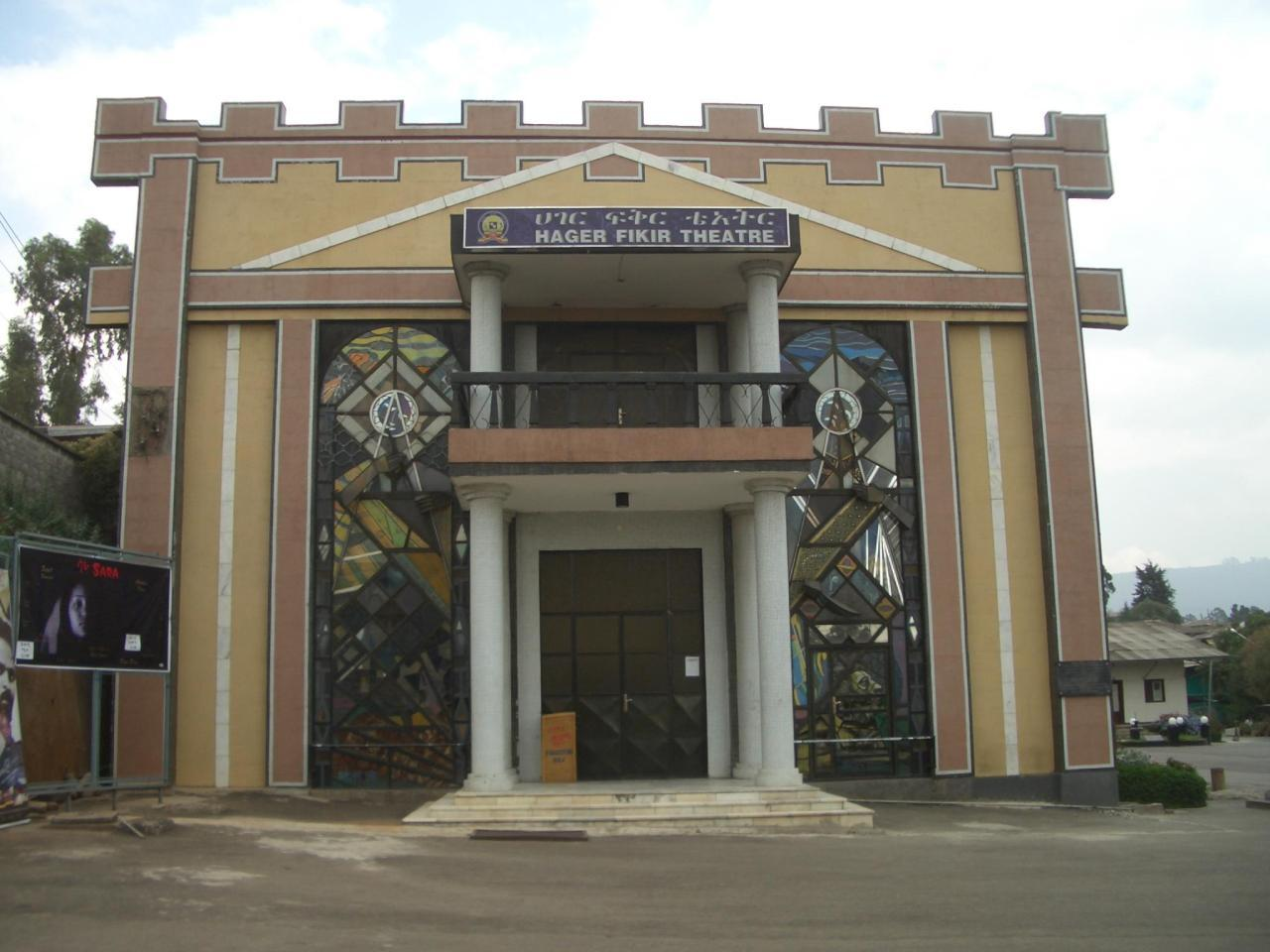
- Hager Fikir Theatre in April 2006

General information
- Architectural style: Classical
- Location: 2QQ3+5R4, John Melly St, Arada district, Addis Ababa, Ethiopia
- Coordinates: 9.037873°N 38.754593°E
- Construction started: July 1935
- Inaugurated: 1942
- Cost: 13 ETB million
- Owner: Private

The Hager Fikir Theatre (Amharic: ሃገር ፍቅር ቲያትር) is a theatre in Addis Ababa, Ethiopia. One of the oldest and foremost theatre in Ethiopian history, it served as a multipurpose venue for artistic performances over half decades.

== History ==
The theatre was incorporated in 1935 by collaborative association Ye-hager Fikir Mahber. The formation originally aimed for preemptive union of Ethiopian nation and its culture against upcoming Italian full invasion of the country a year later. The first performance was produced outdoor set at Menelik Square and dramatic performance such as Fukera and Shilela, traditional songs and poetry were followed through the stage. One of prominent figure and pioneer of Ethiopian drama Yoftahe Negussie also appeared in the scene. At the onset of Italian occupation brace up, Ye-hager Fikir Mahber nevertheless resumed its underground development of the theatre, and predominantly influence the people against Italian aggression via producing variety of music, plays, dance and drama. In response, the Fascist government violently imprisoned, torture and kill its members. This actually forced to cease the movement until Ethiopian liberation in 1941. Ye-hager Fikir Mahber then reinstated their work and relocated the theatre to warehouse in Piazza, which was renewed in 1942. Since Ethiopian National Theatre rose to fame, the Hager Fikir Theatre began modernized and more popular hosting several prominent figures such as Tilahun Gessesse and Aster Aweke thereafter.

Ethiopian plays as well as William Shakespeare, Friedrich Schiller, Henrik Ibsen and Molière literature were reworked in recent years. Besides, the Hager Fikir hosted rehearsal film shows on stage, especially in public holidays.

== General references ==
- History of Ethiopian Theatre
- Ethiopian Theatre in Amharic
