= Bolel =

Bolel is a style of Ethiopian music that evolved out of the Azmari musical tradition in Addis Ababa and elements of modern urban culture. The word bolel is a corrupted form of the word meaning dust, in reference to the bad roads of the rural countryside.
