= Menzuma =

Ethiopian Islamic chant

Menzuma is a Sufi Islamic chant by Ethiopians, mainly to praise Allah and bless the Islamic prophet Muhammad. It is common in Mualid and similar events.
