= Hatata =

Philosophical treatise by the Ethiopian philosophers Zera Yacob and Walda Heywat

Start of the Hatata of Zara Yaqob in D'Abbadie 215

Hatata (/hɑːˈtɑːtə/; Geʽez: ሐተታ ḥätäta "inquiry") is a Geʽez term describing an investigation or inquiry. The hatatas are two 17th century ethical and rational philosophical treatises from present-day Ethiopia: One hatata is written by the Abyssinian philosopher Zara Yaqob (Zär'a Ya'eqob/Zera Yacob, in his text also named Wärqe, 1600–1693), supposedly in 1668. The other hatata is written by his patron's son, Walda Heywat (Wäldä Hewat) some years later, in 1693 or later. Especially Zera Yacob's inquiry has been compared by scholars to Descartes'. But while Zera Yacob was critical towards all religions, including his "own" Ethiopian Orthodox Tewahedo Church, Descartes followed a more traditional religious perspective: "A major philosophical difference is that the Catholic Descartes explicitly denounced 'infidels' and atheists, whom he called 'more arrogant than learned' in his Meditations on First Philosophy (1641)."

In late 2023, De Gruyter published the first English translation of the texts outside of Ethiopia, "The Hatata Inquiries: Two Texts of Seventeenth-Century African Philosophy from Ethiopia about Reason, the Creator, and Our Ethical Responsibilities".

Zara Yaqob was religious, but he had survived religious persecution and he was skeptical about the claims of organized religion. The treatise's criticism of religion targets in particular Christianity, Islam, Judaism and the Indian religions. He criticizes the Mosaic law as misogynistic and against nature, because (in his view) it impedes marriage and the entire life of a woman, it prevents the upbringing of children, and it destroys love.

== Contents of the two Hatatas/Inquiries ==
According to the first Inquiry (Hatata), the teacher and scribe Zara Yaqob developed his thinking as an investigation of the light of reason after he had to flee his hometown of Aksum in ca. 1630, because of the religious persecution by the Portuguese Jesuits and the Ethiopian Emperor Susenyos I, who had converted from Ethiopian Orthodox Christianity to Catholicism in 1622. Zara Yaqob writes that he lived in a cave for two years, while he penned down the text more than thirty years later, in 1668.

Zara Yacob is most noted for this philosophy surrounding the principle of harmony. He asserted that an action's morality is decided by whether it advances or degrades overall harmony in the world. While he did believe in a deity, whom he referred to as God, he criticised several sets of religious beliefs. Rather than deriving beliefs from any organized religion, Yacob sought the truth in observing the natural world. In Hatata, Zera Yacob applied the idea of a first cause to produce a proof for the existence of God, thus proposing a cosmological argument. "If I say that my father and my mother created me, then my parents’ creator and their parents’ creator must still be searched for, until arriving at the first ones who were not conceived like us, but who came into this world in another way, without parents. For, if they were conceived, I don't know where their genealogy begins unless I say, ‘There is one being who created them out of nothing, one who was not created, but rather already existed and will exist forever."

Hence, Zara Yaqob concludes that there has to be a creator god: "I said, 'Therefore, there is a creator', because if there were no creator, then the creation would not have existed. Because we exist and are not creators but rather are created, we have to say that there is a creator who fashioned us. Further, this creator who fashioned us with the faculties of reason and speech cannot himself be without these faculties of reason and speech, because from the abundance of his reason he created us with the faculty of reason. 'He understands all things, because he created all things, and he sustains all things'."

After he left his cave, as peace was restored in Ethiopia, Zara Yaqob proposed marriage to a poor maiden named Hirut. In his inquiry he states that "husband and wife are equal in marriage". Hence, the global historian of ideas Dag Herbjørnsrud writes: "In chapter five, Yacob applies rational investigation to the different religious laws. He criticises Christianity, Islam, Judaism and Indian religions equally. For example, Yacob points out that the Creator in His wisdom has made blood flow monthly from the womb of women, in order for them to bear children. Thus, he concludes that the law of Moses, which states that menstruating women are impure, is against nature and the Creator, since it 'impedes marriage and the entire life of a woman, and it spoils the law of mutual help, prevents the bringing up of children and destroys love'. In this way, Yacob includes the perspectives of solidarity, women and affection in his philosophical argument."

Upon Zara Yaqob's death in 1693 his pupil Walda Heywat updated the work to include his death, in addition to writing his own Hatata. Heywat's inquiry has been described as more traditional. Belcher summarizes the two texts as thus: "Sometimes exuberant, sometimes curmudgeonly, these texts delight in surprising the reader. They fiercely celebrate what is human and criticize pious cant. They put desire above asceticism, love above sectarianism, and the natural world above its uses. They advocate for the rights of women and of animals, plead for religious and cultural tolerance, and condemn slavery and warfare. They give advice on how to be happy in life, work, and marriage. They offer ontological proofs for God and explore the nature of being, as well as the human, ethics, and the divine. They ask epistemological questions about what we can know and how we know it, while establishing the right methods for evaluating evidence and discerning the truth. And they insist that we the reader must use our own reason to test ideas, rather than simply accepting others' beliefs because we were told we should."

== Translations of the texts ==
The Hatatas became accessible in Europe in 1904, when the German scholar Enno Littmann published the original texts in Geʽez in addition to a Latin translation. The texts were first rediscovered, in the summer of 1903, by Boris Turayev in the archives of the collector Antoine d'Abbadie, who had received the Hatatas from the Jesuit monk Guisto da Urbino in 1853-54. The texts were given to France's National Library in Paris in 1902, after d'Abbadie's death, and Turayev translated the first extracts in December 1903 (St. Petersburg). The Oriental Section of the Archeological Society held a meeting in Paris, on 25 Sept. 1903, dedicated to Turayev's report on the Hatatas.

Littmann presented a German translation in 1916. An abridged translation in English, of Zera Yacob's inquiry only, appeared in New Times and Ethiopia News (London) from 5 February until 4 March 1944. In 1955, Zamanfas Kidus Abreha published both an Ethiopic version (based on Littmann) and an Amharic translation. In 1965, Lino Marchiotto presented his doctoral thesis on the Hatatas, and he included an Italian translation based on Littmann's Latin version.

A breakthrough came in 1976, when the Canadian born scholar Claude Sumner - Professor and Chairman of the Department of Philosophy at the Addis Ababa University - published the first complete English translation (it was published in Ethiopia, and it was based on his translations in Ekklastikos Pharos in 1971/1974). Sumner states on the inquiry by Zera Yacob: "Being in possession of one basic principle, the author extends its application to the various branches of knowledge, and in particular, to theodicy, to ethics, and to psychology. (...) It exhibits not only independence of thought, but even rationalistic and radical traits (...) Zär'a Ya'eqob is a real philosopher in the strictest sense of the word."

In 2016, the two texts were translated from Geʽez to Norwegian, by the scholar Reidulf Molvær, and published in Norwegian by a renowned publisher. In 2023, a critical English translation, by Ralph Lee, Wendy Laura Belcher, and Mehari Worku, in cooperation with Jeremy R. Brown, was published by De Gruyter.

== Controversy over authorship ==
In 1920, the Italian orientalist Carlo Conti Rossini claimed that the Hatata texts were written by the Italian priest Guisto de Urbino himself. Rossini got support for his theory in 1934, when the German Eugen Mittwoch, also argued that the philosophical Hatata texts could not have been written by an African. In his work of 1976, Sumner published a lengthy rebuttal of Rossini's and Mittwoch's claims, and in 2017, received support from the Ethiopian-American philologist Getatchew Haile (1931–2021), widely considered the foremost scholar of the Geʽez language and literature.

In 2023, the team of modern Geʽez scholars concluded: "As translators and editors, Ralph Lee and I have spent several years deep in these two texts, feeling our way, word by word, sentence by sentence, chapter by chapter, through their language, concerns, and styles. Mehari Worku and Jeremy R. Brown joined us later and spent many months doing the same. From these extended encounters, we are all confident that two Ethiopians named Zara Yaqob and Walda Heywat composed these two texts. In this, we stand with dozens of other scholars, including the late Getatchew Haile."

In the paper "Italian scientists and the war in Ethiopia" (2015), Professor Roberto Maiocchi points out that Rossini were among the most important scholars supporting Italy's invasion of Ethiopia in 1935: "(...) Carlo Conti Rossini, Italy’s main expert in Ethiopian literature, published an article in September 1935, a few days before the beginning of the conflict: using arguments that could apply to any African country, he stated that Abissinia was incapable of evolution and civil progress, and therefore its conquest was justified." After the conquest of Ethiopia, Rossini received a prize from the Mussolini regime in 1937. Mittwoch, who had Jewish background, kept his position in Nazi Germany until December 1935, after the outbreak of the Italio-Ethiopian war, because of a special intervention by Mussolini with Hitler on behalf of Mittwoch, as Mussolini "saw Mittwoch as a potential asset for Italy's colonization of Ethiopia."

Rossini argued that the Franciscan Jesuit monk Urbino did not send the original manuscripts to the collector d'Abbadie, but instead sent "copies" he had made by his own hand. Rossini also claimed that a monk, Tekle Haymanot, had heard other people say that Urbino might have written the treatise in cooperation with other Geʽez scholars in Ethiopia. This "fraud theory" also claims that there was an anticipated place in d'Abbadie's then growing collection of Ethiopian literature for "scientific" and other rare subjects to be placed in, and that Urbino was able to deliver and satisfy this need of his financial sponsor. A scholar who presently has subscribed to the theory of Rossini, is Anaïs Wion, a prominent French scholar of Ethiopic Literature.

Those who hold it to be rather impossible that an Italian priest, with a couple of years training in Geʽez, could have written both the texts of Zara Yaqob and Walda Heywat, two rather different texts supposedly from the 17th century, while he visited Ethiopia, include the Canadian Professor Claude Sumner, the American scholar and philosopher Teodros Kiros, and several others. In 2017, the senior and foremost Professor within Geʽez studies today, Getatchew Haile (1931–2021), published a book with a chapter on his new views upon the Hatatas, as he had for a long time rejected the authenticity of the Hatatas. Inspired by a 2007 thesis, written by Luam Tesfalidet, and after reading Wion's articles, he writes, under the headline Sources: "(...) I am now firmly inclined to believe that the original Hatata is the work of an Ethiopian debtera who lived, as he claimed, during the era of the Catholics (reign of Emperor Susenyos, 1607-32)."

His conclusion: "The Jesuits worked hard to convert Ethiopians to Catholicism and had some significant successes. They succeeded in converting Emperors Za Dengel (1603-04) and Susenyos (1607-32) and many priests and monks, including the leadership of Debre Libanos. They influenced the thinking of many who then questioned the traditions of their Ethiopian Orthodox Church. Accordingly, it makes more sense to suspect the influence of Catholic teaching on the thinking of Zera Yacob than to ascribe his Hatata to da Urbino."

In Belcher's 110-page long Introduction in the new scholarly translation at De Gruyter (2023), she devotes 37 pages to a sub-chapter named "The Authorship of the Hatata Inquiries." The Geʽez scholar team is "strongly asserting our confidence in their authorship by Zara Yaqob and Walda Heywat". Belcher debunks the theories of Rossini and Wion: "Conti Rossini's and Wion's proofs about Giusto da Urbino's state of mind are among the strongest proofs we have that he was not the author. Their premise is wrong, based on a fundamental misunderstanding of the tenor of the Hatata Inquiries. Both texts are quite joyful. They are not in any way bitter screeds but rather are celebratory—whether about creation, marriage, or humanity's intellectual capacity." "Wion's articles would have been strengthened if she had consulted the research about authorship published after the 1930s. Her articles proceed without awareness of the rebuttals of Conti Rossini and Eugen Mittwoch's work. For instance, she takes as given Conti Rossini's overvaluation of Giusto da Urbino's skills, while Sumner has dozens of pages of proof showing that they were weak. She cites only one Ethiopian article on the authorship debate, and then only to say that it 'ignored the Western academic debate' (Wion 2021b, 21). Wion does cite Sumner, but only his helpful primary source translations—she does not discuss his arguments or evidence."

In the "Conclusion" of the Introduction, Belcher writes: "The longer you read, the more an inescapable feeling grows—Ethiopians wrote these texts. The evidence in wording, sentiment, outlook, theology, rhetoric, style, technique, and a thousand other things is too overwhelming. Every sentence has something deeply Ethiopian. Almost everyone who has argued against their Ethiopian authorship has not read them in Geʽez."

== External links and sources ==
- Petri Liukkonen. "Yacob Zara". Books and Writers.
- "In You I Take Shelter: Zera Yacob": Podcast by Peter Adamson and Chike Jeffers.
- A Brief Guide to the Hatätas (links to different translations)
- Ethiopian Philosophy – A blog with commentary on the Hatata
- Encyclopaedia Aethiopica: D-Ha. Otto Harrassowitz Verlag. 2003, p. 1046.
- "Preface" (Open Access), by Dag Herbjørnsrud, in: The Hatata Inquiries: Two Texts of Seventeenth-Century African Philosophy from Ethiopia about Reason, the Creator, and Our Ethical Responsibilities (2023).
