= Wedding customs in Ethiopia =

Aspect of Ethiopian culture

Wedding customs in Ethiopia vary among the tribes of the country.

== Dating culture ==
Marriages between a man and a woman are mainly organised by their families, so there is no dating culture in Ethiopia. If a couple has chosen each other, they still need the blessing of their parents.

== Marital age ==
In Ethiopia, the average age of marriage for women is 18-19 and for men 28-29.

== Orthodox wedding ceremony ==
In Ethiopia, approximately 43.5 percent of the population identifies as Orthodox Christian. Before the wedding, the community elders conduct a genealogical tree study of the families of the bride and groom up to 7 generations to see if there is a kinship between them. Marriage is forbidden among relatives, godparent with godchild, and with persons related by marriage. It is forbidden up to 7 generations on both sides for relatives to marry, but beyond that it is permitted to marry.

On the wedding day, the ceremony is conducted by the priest. During the ceremony, the bride and groom sit and the priest stands behind them, which is done to show that the bride and groom are the "king" and "queen" for the day and should be given due respect. During the ceremony, the exchange of vows, the exchange of wedding rings, the blessing of the priest and the wearing of the crowns are obligatory. In all parts of the ceremony, the groom is first.

== Mareko Tribe ==
The Mareko tribe has its own traditional wedding customs. Women get married aged 15–17, men, 16–20. This tribe has eight different types of weddings. Tewaja means an arranged wedding, Alulima is an accidental wedding, Shokokanecho is where the man goes to the bride's house with his friends and takes her by force. Gusno is a wedding by abduction, while Herima is a mind game played on the woman, where a third person middleman tells the woman good things about the man, until she agrees to the wedding. Abagadima is when the bride goes to the house of the man she wants to marry and tells his family that she has fallen in love with him, the groom's family then accepts her and the wedding is held. Meinbetoma is when the wife dies, and if the man is thought to be a good person, he will be given his wife's sister so she can make him forget his wife and take care of him and his children. According to the written documents found in this tribe, Tewaja or arranged wedding is related to the religious ceremony of that tribe. First, the groom tells his friends to tell his family which girl he wants to marry. If his family agrees then he starts the preparation. Early in the morning his friends will go to the bride's house, draw their swords out, and enter the house by force, and stay there for some time, then go out without saying a word. This action continues for three days, but not on Friday's or Wednesday's, because these days are considered unlucky.

On the first day to the bride's house, the groom's friends pay attention to everything they see on their way. If a bird named Tarailae passes them on their left, or a girl who carries a pot full of water, it is believed that the wedding will be blessed. But if they see Tarailae passing on their right, or a girl who carries an empty pot, and especially if they see the bride cleaning her house, then it is believed that it is not God's will and so the preparation stops immediately. If his friends are lucky and she is the right woman for him then they say to her family "We have come here to be your sons and ask you to be our parents, as we have seen, and as you have witnessed the bird has given us your daughter, so we ask you to give us your daughter as well". The person who has been asked will then tell the bride's mother. The bride's mother will discuss this issue with her husband and give an answer after a few days. If both the mother and the father agree, then the groom's friends will kiss the mother's shoulder as a way of showing respect and honor. The next part of the wedding is when all of the family's neighbors and the family of the bride have a meeting on a large shed, to decide whether she should marry this family or not after several investigations of what kind of a person the groom is. If all agree that she should get married then the elders are sent to the bride's uncle's house. Since the uncle understands that they came because of the respect they have for him, he will say, "If her mother, her father and the bird gave you the permission then I will also give you my permission." After this, a date is set and the marriage will be held.

== Bena Tribe ==
The Bena tribe is one of the southern tribes and tribalities of Ethiopia. There are different types of wedding in this tribe and pre-requisite customs. According to the norm of this culture, before a man's life partner is chosen for him he is supposed to jump a row of oxen. Before this, the man will tell his family that he is ready to jump these oxen, so his families will prepare a huge celebration. If he completes his challenge successfully, he thighs his waist with a nail using a leather. This nail is a necklace given to his bride later on. After this ceremony the preparation of finding the right fit for him starts. Once he completes his four rounds of jumping the row of oxen he only eats meat and honey, and drinks only milk for three consecutive months until he finds the right life partner. If his family had chosen a bride for him before he jumped, elders go to the girl's house. The man also looks for his life partner outside of his clan. If he finds her, he uses force to make her eat any kind of cereal that is found around them. If this happens it is thought that she has become his bride and she is no longer anyone's but his. If the girl who ate the cereal is a child then she is allowed to stay with her family until she is 15 or 20. After that he might send elders to her family or take her forcefully. Accordingly, the first wife of a man who completed his challenge of jumping the row of ox is called a bignarow. If he wants to get married again due to different circumstances then he is not expected to jump anymore. Women wear a certain type of jewelry to show that they are ready to be married as a second wife.

The other type of wedding is called baskin. This wedding is where the younger brother takes his older brother's wife when he dies. If her dead husband does not have a younger brother, then another person from their clan will marry her.

If a man of this clan has a lot of money and high economical status he is then allowed to marry 10 girls at once. The next step now is giving gifts to the bride's family: telosh. Depending on the type of wedding the amount of the telosh increases, the groom might even pay until the third generation to her family. If he married her by abduction then the amount of the telosh to be paid increases. Finally the wedding is held in a huge ceremony.

== Dasenech Tribe ==
Dasenech is one of the 16 tribes found in the southern Omo. There are four types of wedding customs in this tribe. Darch is a kind of wedding ceremony that happens when the groom's family asks the bride's family if she can marry their son. If the boy is afraid of asking he will send his best friend at night to her family as a messenger. The messenger should have a coffee bean in his hand when he goes to her house. Then the messenger would put the coffee bean inside a kind of bowl called Nono without being seen by her family and then go back home. The bride's family, when they see the coffee bean inside their Nono, since they didn't see who put it there, they would secretly search the for person in their community. After they found the groom's family they would prepare the coffee bean and invite them to their house to drink coffee together. While they are drinking coffee, the bride's family will ask if the groom has enough cattle, goats and sheep as a dowry. If they have enough, then her family would agree to the wedding. At first her family would order the groom's family to bring four goats. Then the goats will be slaughtered and the front leg of each goat will be given to the messenger. Afterward her family would ask for an additional ten head of cattle. Finally, the boy would take his wife.

Seriti, the second type of wedding, is mostly practiced in southern tribes and tribalities. This kind of wedding happens when the bride does not agree to marry or due to lack of money of the groom's family in order to pay for dowry. Therefore, if the groom's family does not meet these standards, or if she doesn't agree he will abduct her. Finally, the case will be handled by the elders, who come up with a solution.

Ayod is the type of wedding where the married elder man of the house dies but his wife is still alive; then his younger brother will marry her.

Egutunais is where the man who wants to marry the girl brings several herds of cattle to the bride's family, then takes the bride to his house and marries her.

== Kafficho Tribe ==
Kafficho is one of the SNNPR region. In this culture the wedding age for girls begins at 18 and for boys it starts at 20. Initially, if the groom and bride's father make an agreement for the wedding, the groom will send elders to the bride's family to ask her feelings. Most of the time the girl will tell her mother. If the response is "no" the answer will be sent with the messenger. But if the answer is ‘yes’ they will start getting ready for the wedding ceremony. On the day of the wedding the groom and the best man start to blow on an elephant horn called shameto to show they are arriving at the bride's house.

When the bride, groom and best man arrive at bride's home they will rotate three javelins and sit. After months the girl's family will call the best man and the best man will stay there for days. The amount of dowry will be decided based on the groom's wealth, power, appellation and family tree. In this culture when the girl is pregnant and if her time to give birth is near she will go to her mother-in-law's house to get more protection and care.

== Tsemay Tribe ==
The Tsemay tribe has about five different types of weddings. These include weddings done by agreement between the families (Haliko Egael), by agreement of the couple (Wawaki Bais), abduction weddings (Midi), the inheritance wedding (Shano) and the replacement wedding (Sagarte).

Haliko Eagael first starts with the man choosing the best candidate to be his wife. After he chooses he tells his family, and elder mediators are sent to the girl's house. The elders, after talking with her father, agree to the dowry, leave the house and go home. The bride's father decides the amount of the dowry. The dowry may include cattle, sheep, and goats. Honey, coffee and butter are also advisable. On the wedding day, unlike in other cultures in Ethiopia, the man isn't supposed to go to her house to take her to his house. Instead the bride's brothers and relatives take her to the groom's house. After eating the food and enjoying all the preparations made by the groom's family for a day, the relatives of the bride go back to their homes. If not invited by the bride's relatives the families have no chance of meeting each other.

The second wedding type, Wawaki Bais, is by agreement of the couple. Families, especially the bride's, are not asked for permission to marry. After the woman has entered the man's house, the family of the man sends elders to say, "Your daughter is with us."

Even though there is no agreement of the families, the dowry must always be paid. If not, the wedding will not continue and the families might fight one other.

Abduction weddings, Midi, are performed without the knowledge of the girl; he kidnaps her by force. If a man is married this way, since it is believed that he disgraces the girl's family pride, his punishment is severe.

Shano, inheritance weddings occur when a wife dies, so that the husband does not need to carry the burden of raising children alone, a sister or a close relative is chosen from her family and given to the husband as replacement.

Another wedding tradition occasionally occurs, known as loan wedding (Yedubegabicha). This occurs when the boy has no satisfactory income to pay for the dowry. He asks their permission by promising to pay up by working and give labor service to her family. In accordance to the agreement, he needs to work by going to her family every day and finish paying for the dowry by working overtime. Now, if the husband dies without finishing the payments, his children continue to pay. Since everyone wants many children, having more than one wedding is fine.

== Ayda Tribe ==
The Ayda tribe, one of the southern tribes, tribalities and peoples of Ethiopia, have several different wedding customs. It is mainly found in the southern Gofa woreda around twelve kebeles there are four types of wedding customs in the tribe. These are by the agreement of the families, of the couple, and also by abduction and inheritance. If both parties agree the man tries to attract his bride by performing a dance named Wonde in which he circles her alone. If the girl agrees he gives her a ring, or if he doesn't have one, he puts wet grass on her finger, then starts his own house and collects money to be used after wedding. His father gives him a bit of land. After finishing these preparations, elders are sent to her house. Her families set a date for their engagement and at last the wedding proceeds. To test the efficiency/density of the wedding they kill a goat by a stick called Girawa. The intestines are checked by the elders. If the Gethu is not attractive enough, the wedding is stopped and she returns to her family's house. If the wedding succeeds but she doesn't give birth to a child, the dowry is returned. Without being given money, the couple separates and she has to return to her house. If they have given birth the man is not yet acknowledged as a father. In the tradition if the delivery day is approaching, a separate building behind their house is built, and she stays there for six months after giving birth.

== See also ==
- Culture of Ethiopia
