= Mengistu Lemma =

Ethiopian playwright and poet

Mengistu Lemma (1924–1988) was an Ethiopian playwright and poet.

== Biography ==
Mengistu was born in Harar, to Aleqa Lemma Hailu and Wro Abebech Yilma. After undertaking traditional religious studies at the Tiqo Mekane Selassie church where his father was Aleqa (a title given to church leaders), he moved to the capital Addis Ababa due to the transfer of his father to the Qatchane Medhane'alem Church. There he was admitted to Kotebe Qedamawi Haile Selassie School.

In 1948, Mengistu studied in London at the Regent Street Polytechnic before studying economics and political science at the London School of Economics. In the six years he spent in London, he was able to meet and then establish friendship with the famous British playwright George Bernard Shaw.

In 1954, Mengistu returned to Ethiopia and was sent to the embassy of Ethiopia in India as the First Secretary of the Ethiopian Embassy in New Delhi. There he completed his play Telfo Be Kissie (Marriage by Abduction) (1959), which he had created for a marriage ceremony while he was in Ethiopia. This play was the first modern comedy play in the history of Ethiopian theatre. He also wrote Yalacha Gabicha (Marriage of Unequals) (1964), Tsere Colonialist and Bale Kaba Ena Bale Daba (1979). In addition, Mengistu translated Anton Chekhov's The Bear as Dandiew Chabude and J.B. Priestley's An Inspector Calls as Tayaqi. He also published the first Amharic book on dramatic techniques.

Mengistu was fluent in English and spoke French and Italian. His travels included New York, Montreal and the Soviet Union (1965), Sweden, Denmark and Turkey (1967), Scandinavia (1969), and Los Angeles (1970).

Mengistu was the Director General of the Ethiopian Ministry of Foreign Affairs; Secretary General of the Ethiopian Literary Society; Council Member on the Ethiopian National Council for UNESCO; and Council Member of the Ethiopian Orthodox Church Evangelical Council. On the basis of his outstanding contribution to Amharic literature, he was awarded the 1967 Haile Selassie I Prize Trust Award.

== Writings ==
Different social and political, as well as traditional and cultural issues dominate the plays of Mengistu Lemma:

- Telfo Be Kissie: This play deals with the social reality that was dominant in Ethiopia during that time, i.e. abduction. Abduction was considered as a way of marriage in traditional Ethiopia (whether the woman agreed or disagreed). Mengistu Lemma expressed his hope of developing a society of males who give priority to rationality and respect the interest of women by the evidence of his main character Bezabih.
- Yalacha Gabicha: This play deals with the idea of marriage between two persons, Bahiru who represents the higher class of society and Belete who represents the lowest class. It was also a social reality in the traditional Ethiopian society to divide people by the procedure of blood lines and to not accept a marriage between members of different classes. But Bahiru, who was from the higher class of the society and at the same time who was educated, broke this tradition by marrying Belete, who was only a servant in his house. This play also deals with social issues like witchcraft.
- Tsere Colonialist: This historical play depicts the political and social situations in Ethiopia during the years of Italian occupation. It also focuses on the contribution of the Ye Wust Arbegnoch, city and town patriots who supported the patriots in war fronts by forwarding information and providing weapons and food.
- Bale Kaba Ena Bale Daba: This play deals with the life standards and philosophical or ideological differences between young, educated Ethiopians and their differences on issues like materialism, idealism, socialism, and capitalism. One of the main characters, Techane, exhibits a character of selfishness and carelessness about the idea of eradicating poverty in his country which was primarily the promise given by all intellectuals of his time including himself while they were abroad for higher education. But after coming back home, he is found unfaithful to his promise and leads a luxurious life. His former classmate and friend Gezmu, who keeps his promise is seen as his main opponent.
