= Eskista =

Form of dance in Ethiopia

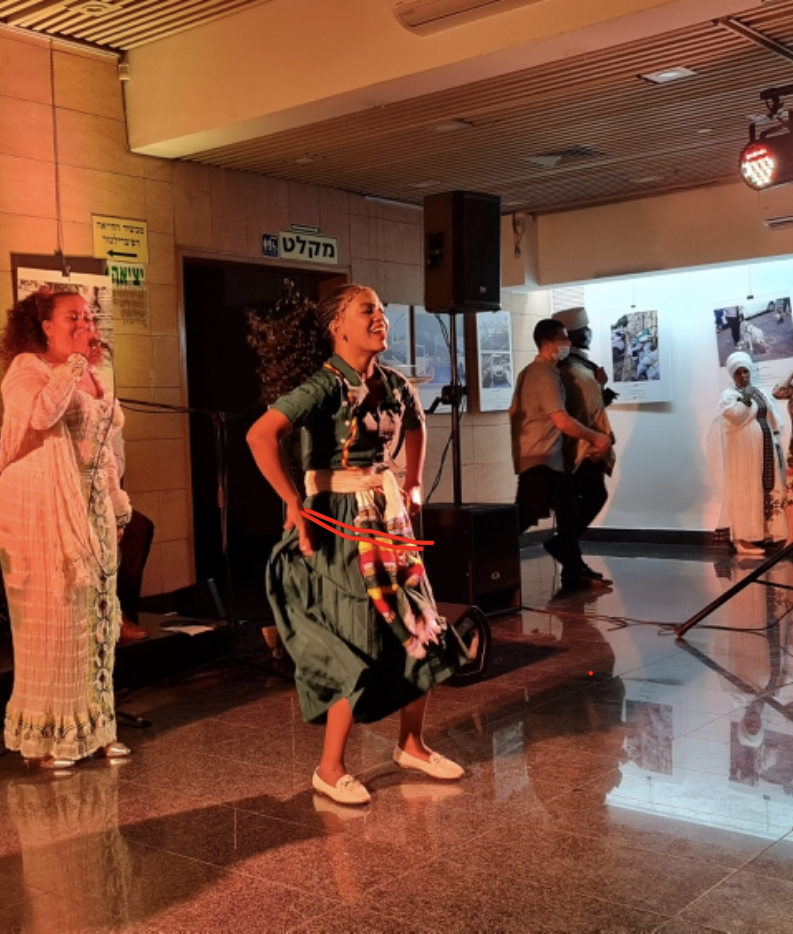
Demonstration of Ekista

Eskista (Amharic: እስክስታ) is a traditional Amhara cultural dance originated by the Amhara ethnic group in Ethiopia. "Eskista" means "dancing shoulders" in Amharic.

Due to the widespread influence of the Amhara people, the dance is performed in almost every corner of the country and has gone viral internationally, becoming a global trend celebrated by diverse audiences. It is enjoyed by men, women, and children. The dance is characterized by its rapid, rhythmic movements of the upper body, particularly the shoulders, but also the chest, head, and neck. Eskista is typically performed to traditional Amhara music, but it is possible to incorporate the style of dance into modern forms of music such as the music played in modern Ethiopian music videos. The complex nature of eskista dancing is what makes it arguably one of the most technical forms of African traditional dance. The dance resembles and lis likely related to the shimshim of the Tigrayan-Tigrinya people in northern Ethiopia and Eritrea as well as the Beja Hadendoa traditional dance.

There are various rhythmic, regional, and stylistic varieties of the eskista dance, all of which have their own historical and unique origins, although most are based on the hard life of the average farmer in the Amhara Highlands of Ethiopia.

Eskista is a common sight at weddings, celebrations, and gatherings, serving as a vibrant expression of joy and communal bonding. Like many traditional African dances, Eskista is often accompanied by the practice of awarding money, known as shilimat (Amharic: ሽለማት), to the best dancer. Spectators typically stick the money onto the dancer's forehead as a sign of admiration and encouragement, adding a festive and interactive element to the performance. This tradition highlights the cultural significance of eskista as both an art form and a means of fostering social connection and celebration.
