= Manalemosh Dibo =

Ethiopian singer (1971–2009)

Background information
- Born: 25 December 1971; Addis Ababa, Ethiopian Empire
- Died: 22 November 2009 (aged 37) South Africa
- Occupation: Singer
- Instrument: Vocals
- Years active: 2004–2009
- Label: Ambassel

Manalemosh Dibo (Amharic: ማናልሞሽ ዲቦ; 25 December 1971 – 22 November 2009) was an Ethiopian singer who was known for her songs "Asabelew", "Awdamet", and "Minjar".

== Later life and death ==
In 2008, Manalemosh Dibo was diagnosed with colon cancer at Tikur Anbessa Hospital in Addis Ababa. The symptoms became worse and she was transferred to South Africa on 20 October 2009 with financial support from Ethiopian-born Saudi billionaire Mohammed Hussein Al Amoudi. She died on 21 November after being in intensive hospitalization at the age of 37. According to initial Ethiopian news sources, she died from natural causes.

== Discography ==
- Atinkubegn (2004)
