= Tsegaye Gabre-Medhin =

Ethiopian novelist and poet (1936–2006)

Laureate Tsegaye Gabre-Medhin
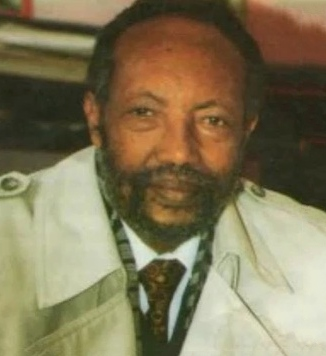
- Gabre-Medhin in the 1980s
- Born: 17 August 1936; Bodaa, Ethiopia
- Died: 25 February 2006 (aged 69); Manhattan, New York City, U.S
- Occupations: Novelist; poet
- Writing career
- Language: Amharic; English
- Years active: 1960–1998
- Period: Modern
- Genre: Narrative
- Notable works: Tewdros; Petros at the Hour; The Oda Oak Oracle

Tsegaye Gabre-Medhin (Amharic: ጸጋዬ ገብረ መድኅን; 17 August 1936 – 25 February 2006) was an Ethiopian poet and novelist. His novels and poems evoke retrospective narratives, fanciful epics, and nationalistic connotations. Gabre-Medhin is considered to be one of the most important Ethiopian novelists, along with Baalu Girma and Haddis Alemayehu. His books have been successful in commercial sales and in even academic theses. His works are solely based in Amharic and English.

== Biography ==
Tsegaye Gabre-Medhin was born on 17 August 1936 in Bodaa village, near Ambo, Ethiopia, some 120 km from the capital Addis Ababa. He was part Amhara and part Oromo. As many Ethiopian boys do, he also learned Ge'ez, the ancient language of the Church, which is an Ethiopian equivalent of Latin. He also helped the family by caring for cattle. He was still very young when he began to write plays while at the local elementary school. One of those plays, King Dionysus and the Two Brothers, was staged in the presence, among others, of Emperor Haile Selassie.

Gabre-Medhin later attended the prestigious British Council-supported General Wingate school – named after British officer Orde Wingate. He subsequently attended the Commercial school in Addis Ababa, where he won a scholarship to Blackstone School of Law in Chicago in 1959. In 1960 he travelled to Europe to study experimental drama at the Royal Court Theatre in London and the Comédie-Française in Paris. Upon returning to Ethiopia, he devoted himself to managing and developing the Ethiopian National Theater.

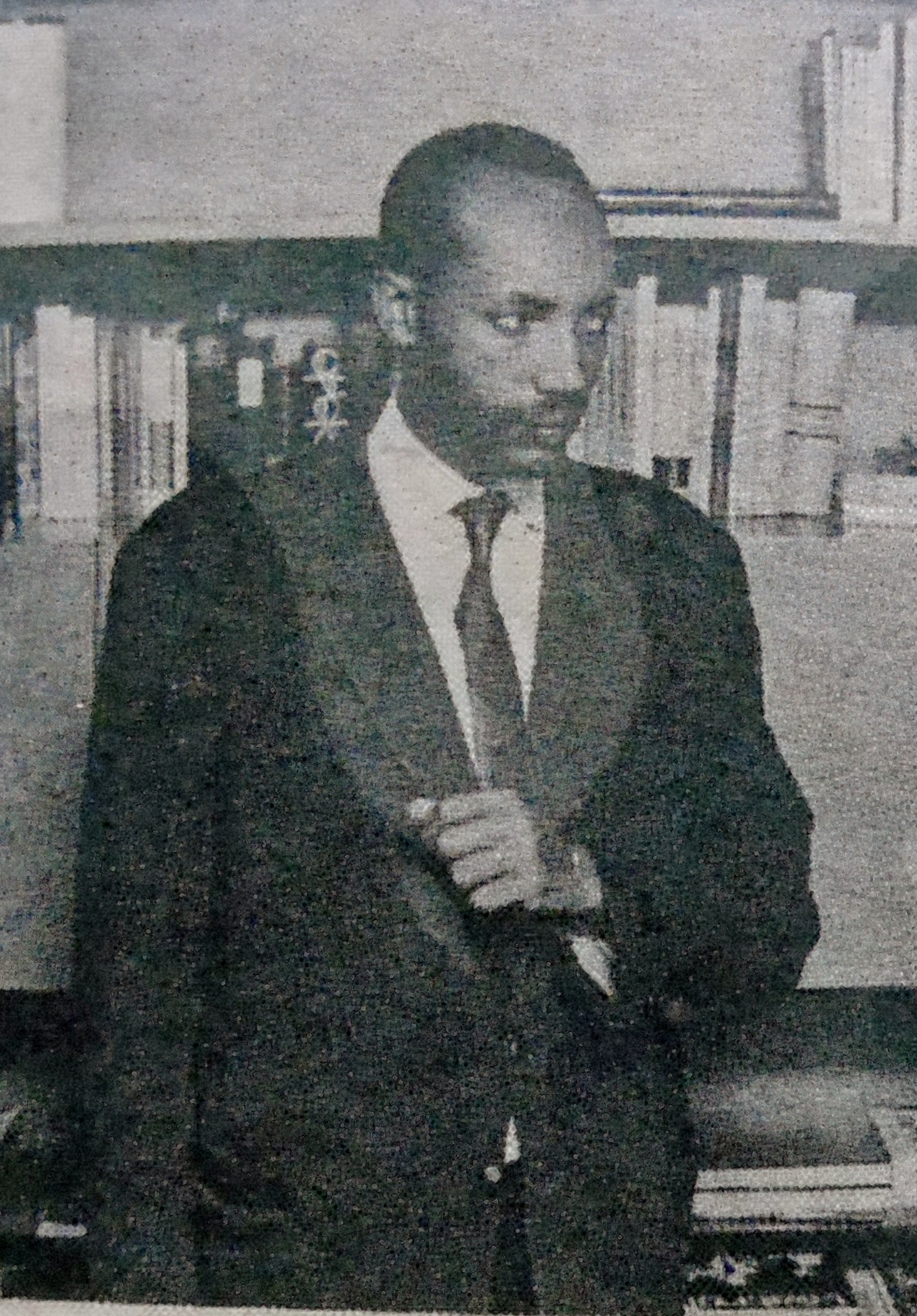
Tsegaye Gabre-Medhin (c.1960)

During this time Gabre-Medhin travelled widely; he attended the first UNESCO-organised World Festival of Black Arts in Dakar, Senegal, and the Pan-African Cultural Festival in Algiers.

In 1966, at the age of only 29, he was awarded his country's highest literary honour, the Haile Selassie I Prize for Amharic Literature, joining the ranks of such distinguished previous recipients as Kebede Michael. The prize earned him the title of Laureate, by which he has ever since been known.

Following the Ethiopian revolution of 1974, Gabre-Medhin was appointed for a short time as vice-minister of culture and sports, and was active in setting up Addis Ababa University department of Theatre Arts. In 1984 he wrote an extended, and very poetical, essay "Footprints in Time", which appeared in large format with photographs by the Italian photographer Alberto Tessore. It traced Ethiopian history from the prehistoric time of Lucy, the first-known hominid that had recently been found in the Afar Desert in eastern Ethiopia.

One of Gabre-Medhin's passionate interests throughout this time was in the struggle to regain Ethiopia's looted treasures. A close friend of Chief Olusegun Olusola, the Nigerian Ambassador in Addis Ababa, who was a fellow poet, Gabre-Medhin was present when the ambassador agreed to throw his diplomatic pressure behind the national demand for the return of the Aksum obelisk, which had been taken on Mussolini's personal orders in 1937. The chief's support marked a turning point in the Aksum Obelisk Return movement. Gabre-Medhin was no less insistent that Britain should return the manuscripts, crosses, tents and other loot taken from Emperor Tewodros' mountain citadel. Much of this loot is currently in the British Museum, the British Library, and the Royal Library in Windsor Castle.

Gabre-Medhin always believed in the unity of the Ethiopian people and felt that this by far transcended purely political matters of the day. In later years he concerned himself increasingly with questions of peace, human rights and the dignity of humanity. He was elected to the United Poets Laureate International, and received many international awards – the last of them from Norway.

Although unable to return to his native land, which lacked the dialysis facilities on which his life depended, he remained in close contact with the Ethiopian diaspora. Gabre-Medhin died in Manhattan, where he had moved in 1998 to receive treatment for kidney disease. He was buried in Addis Ababa at Holy Trinity Cathedral church, where the body of Emperor Haile Selassie lies.

== Works ==
Tsegaye Gabre-Medhin was proud of Ethiopia's long history of independence and her unique cultural heritage. He insisted emphatically that his country needed heroes, and used the theatre deliberately to teach his compatriots to respect the Ethiopian heroes of their past. One of the most widely acclaimed of his plays, Tewodros, commemorates the life of Tewodros II. Considered a pioneer reformer and moderniser, the emperor committed suicide in 1868 rather than fall into the hands of a hostile British expeditionary force.

Another of Gabre-Medhin's plays, Petros at the Hour, tells the story of Abune Petros, the Bishop who accompanied the Ethiopian troops in their struggle to resist the Italian fascist occupation. Captured by the enemy on the outskirts of Addis Ababa, the prelate was executed after a show trial. A third play, The Oda Oak Oracle, a tragedy about Ethiopian country life, also enjoyed great popularity, both in Ethiopia and abroad.

Besides these compositions, Gabre-Medhin translated Shakespeare (Hamlet and Othello being the most popular of these works and directed by Abate Mekuria), as well as Molière's Tartuffe and Le Médecin malgré lui, as well as Bertolt Brecht's Mother Courage.

Gabre-Medhin's poems, in Amharic and English, were also widely read. A score of them, including "Prologue to African Conscience" and "Black Antigone", were published in the Ethiopia Observer in 1965. Another poem, in Amharic, castigated the European nomenclature for the waterfalls of Sudan and Egypt – which totally ignored those of Ethiopia, and caused Gabre-Medhin proudly to refer to the Tis Abay, or Blue Nile Falls, as the "Zero Cataract".

== Quotes ==
"walk in the footprints of his ancestors. This land is a museum of man's ancient history. The American has gone to the moon and has found dust, he's going farther away to look for other planets, very good. But know thyself first. That is what I would tell my American friend"

—Interview on what Ethiopia means to the average American

== Publications ==
- Collision of Altars (Drama, 1977)
- Oda Oak Oracle (Drama, 1965)

== See also ==
- Gibreab Teferi
- Befeqadu Hailu
