= Walda Heywat =

Ethiopian philosopher of 17th century

- ወልደ ሕይወት
- Born: 1633; Emfraz, Tigray, Ethiopian Empire
- Died: 1710 (aged 76–77)

Education
- Academic advisor: Zera Yacob

Philosophical work
- Region: African philosophy
- School: Christian philosophy
- Language: Ge'ez
- Main interests: Reason, ethics, religion
- Notable works: Treatise of Walda Heywat

Walda Heywat (Amharic: ወልደ ሕይወት Wäldä Həywät; 1633–1710), also called Mitku, was an Ethiopian philosopher. He was the beloved disciple of Zera Yacob, who wrote a well regarded work on the nature of truth and reason. Heywat took his mentor’s work and expanded upon it, addressing issues encountered by Ethiopians of that time.

== Biography ==
Walda Heywat was one of the sons of Habtu, a rich Ethiopian merchant from Emfraz, and the student of Zera Yacob, whose work he continued in his Treatise of Walda Heywat, written in Ge'ez. Walda Heywat was the son of Habta Egziabher (also called Habtu), a friend of Zera Yacob in Emfraz, where Zera Yacob spent the second part of his life. Zera Yacob was the teacher of the sons of Habtu and introduced Walda Heywat to his philosophy.

It was Walda Heywat who encouraged Zera Yacob to write his treatise Hatata, describing both his life and his thoughts.

== Philosophical work ==
The personality of Walda Heywat comes out clearly from the analysis of his social ethics. Being a disciple of Zera Yacob and heavily influenced by his master's thought, he wrote his Treatise to explore and explain the ideas of his teacher. Although Zera Yacob's ideas were relatively individualistic, Walda Heywat was a social ethicist. In his writing, Walda Heywat states, "God did not create me only for myself, but placed me in the midst of other created [men] who are equal to me." He also adds, "Man cannot come to existence, grow, and serve by himself without the help of other men."
