= Ethiopian National Theatre =

National theatre in Addis Ababa, Ethiopia

- የኢትዮጵያ ብሔራዊ ቲያትር
- Interactive map of Ethiopian National Theatre
- Former names: Haile Selassie I Theater (1955–1975)
- Address: Gambia St, Arada district Addis Ababa, Ethiopia
- Coordinates: 9.0161°N 38.7519°E
- Owner: Ethiopian government
- Capacity: 1,500
- Type: National theater
- Events: Multipurpose, often entertainment

Construction
- Opened: 1955
- Renovated: 2019
- Cost: 400 million birr (renovation)
- Main contractors: Addis Mebratu Consulting Architects & Engineers

The Ethiopian National Theatre (Amharic: የኢትዮጵያ ብሔራዊ ቲያትር) is a national theatre in central Addis Ababa, Ethiopia. Formerly known as Haile Selassie I Theater, it was initially built by Italians during its occupation of Ethiopia as Cinema Marconi, which consisted of some 250 seats.

In 1955, the theatre was established as national theatre under Emperor Haile Selassie. The Austrian composer Franz Zelwecker was the first director general of the theatre. In 2019, plan to build new headquarter has been commenced.

== Overview ==
Formerly known as the Haile Selassie I Theater, the hall had begun to be built during the Italian occupation as the Cinema Marconi with some 350 seats. The building was later completed in 1955 for the celebrations of the Silver Jubilee, and expanded to seat 1,260 people. The theatre group was founded by the government in the late 1940s, with the main objective of playing Ethiopian songs by soloists accompanied by a modern orchestra.

The Austrian composer Franz Zelwecker became the first director of the National Theater.

The theater is divided into two directorates, one for theater and the other for music. The music directorate includes the Izra Folk Music and Dance Group, Yared Modern Orchestra, Dawit POP Orchestra and String Orchestra.

In 2019, the theatre planned to renovated with 1.5 billion birr, anticipated for completion within five years. The new theatre has 12 storey, lying on 7,000 square kilometers with construction is undertaken by the Addis Mebratu Consulting Architects & Engineers. Initially awarded to the Afro Tsion Construction PLC, the Federal Building Construction Project Office took part in March 2021. Manyazewal Endeshaw has been the director general of the theatre since 2019.

== See also ==
- National Theatre of Somalia
