= Zera Yacob (philosopher) =

Ethiopian philosopher (1600–1693)

- ዘርዐ ያዕቆብ
- Born: 28 August 1600; Aksum, Tigray, Ethiopian Empire
- Died: 1693 (aged 92–93); Emfraz, Begemder, Ethiopian Empire
- Occupation: Teacher

Philosophical work
- Region: African philosophy
- School: Christian philosophy
- Notable students: Walda Heywat
- Language: Ge'ez
- Main interests: Reason, ethics, religious tolerance
- Notable works: Hatata
- Notable ideas: Reason as criterion of belief

Zara Yaqob (/ˈzɛrə ˈjɑːkoʊb/; Ge'ez: ዘርዐ ያዕቆብ; 28 August 1600 – 1693) was an Ethiopian philosopher best known for his treatise, Hatata ("The Inquiry"), which explores themes of reason, morality, and religious tolerance. Forced into exile, he wrote Hatata while living in a cave, where he reflected on questions of faith, ethics, and the nature of truth. Yacob was educated in the Ethiopian Orthodox Christian tradition but developed a distinct philosophical approach that emphasized rational inquiry over religious dogma.

For centuries, Geʽez texts had been written in Ethiopia. Around 1510, Abba Mikael translated and adapted the Arabic Book of the Wise Philosophers, a collection of sayings from the early Greek pre-Socratics, Plato, and Aristotle via the neo-Platonic dialogues, also influenced by Arab philosophy and the Ethiopian discussions.

Zara Yaqob's Inquiry goes further than these former texts, as he argues for following one's natural reasoning instead of believing what one is told by others. He was a contemporary of the female activist Walatta Petros, whose hagiography was written in 1672.

== Biography ==
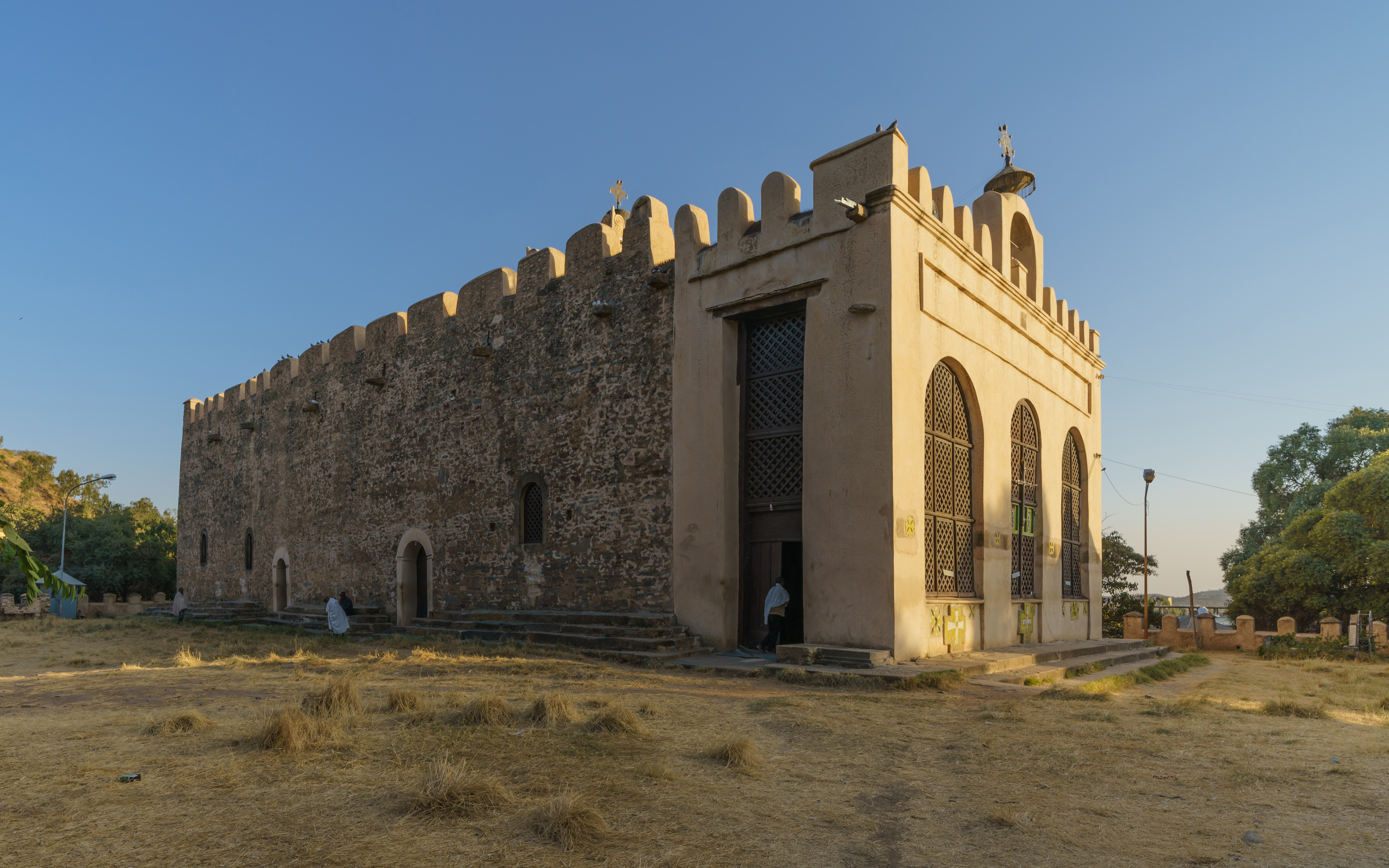
17th-century Church of Our Lady Mary of Zion

Yaqob was born into a farmer family near Aksum in Tigray, the former capital of Ethiopia under the ancient Kingdom of Aksum. Yaqob's name means "The Seed of Jacob" ("Zar" is the Geʽez word for "seed"). Although his father was poor, he supported Yaqob's attendance of traditional schools, where he became acquainted with the Psalms of David and educated in the Ethiopian Orthodox Christian faith. He was denounced before Emperor Susenyos I (r. 1607–1632), who had turned to the Roman Catholic faith and ordered his subjects to follow his own example.

Refusing to adopt the Catholic faith, Yaqob fled into exile with some gold and the Book of Psalms. On the road to Shewa in the south, he found a cave at the foot of the Tekezé River and lived in it as a hermit for two years, praying and developing his philosophy. He wrote of his experience, "I have learnt more while living alone in a cave than when I was living with scholars. What I wrote in this book is very little; but in my cave I have meditated on many other such things."

After the death of the Emperor, Susenyos's son Fasilides (r. 1632–1667), a firm adherent of the Ethiopian Oriental Orthodox Church, took power, expelling the Jesuits, and extirpated the Catholic faith in his kingdom in 1633. Yaqob left his cave and settled in Emfraz. He found a patron, a rich merchant named Habta Egziabher (known as Habtu), and married a maid of the family. He refused to live as a monk and stated that "the law of Christians which propounds the superiority of monastic life over marriage is false and can’t come from God." However, he also rejected polygamy because "the law of creation orders one man to marry one woman."

Yaqob became the teacher of Habtu's two sons, and at the request of his patron's son Walda Heywat, Yacob wrote his famous 1668 treatise investigating the light of reason. Little is known of Yaqob's later life. However, it is believed that he lived a fulfilled family life in Emfraz, and remained there for the next 25 years. He died there in 1693. Yaqob's year of death was recorded by Walda Heywat in an annotation to the Treatise.

== Philosophical work ==
Start of the Hatata

Yaqob is most noted for this ethical philosophy surrounding the principle of harmony. He proposed that an action's morality is decided by whether it advances or degrades overall harmony in the world. While he did believe in a deity, whom he referred to as God, he rejected any set of particular religious beliefs. Rather than deriving beliefs from any organized religion, Yaqob sought the truth in observing the natural world. In Hatata, Yaqob applied the idea of a first cause to produce a proof for the existence of God, thus proposing a cosmological argument in chapter 3 of Hatata: "If I say that my father and my mother created me, then I must search for the creator of my parents and of the parents of my parents until they arrive at the first who were not created as we [are] but who came into this world in some other way without being generated." However, the knowability of God does not depend on human intellect, but "Our soul has the power of having the concept of God and of seeing him mentally. God did not give this power purposelessly; as he gave the power, so did he give the reality." He also argued against religious discrimination, predating John Locke by decades, in chapter 6 of Hatata, starting the chapter with: "All men are equal in the presence of God; and all are intelligent since they are his creatures; he did not assign one people for life, another for death, one for mercy, another for judgment. Our reason teaches us that this sort of discrimination cannot exist."

In chapter 5 of Hatata, he criticizes slavery saying, "what the Gospel says on this subject cannot come from God. Likewise, the Mohammedans said that it is right to go and buy a man as if he were an animal. But with our intelligence, we understand that this Mohammedan law cannot come from the creator of man who made us equal, like brothers, so that we call our creator our father." At the time, slavery was widely practiced in Ethiopia.

=== Authorship controversy ===
The authorship of the Hatata was initially challenged by Carlo Conti Rossini in 1920, who proposed that it had been forged by Father Giusto da Urbino, an Italian Capuchin missionary active in Ethiopia during the 19th century. Rossini's argument was based on extrinsic factors: the relatively recent age of the surviving manuscripts, Urbino’s familiarity with Ethiopic (Geʽez) and Islamic sources, and the fact that he was the first to discover the extant copies.

In 1934, Eugen Mittwoch added linguistic critiques to the forgery hypothesis, and as a result, international scholarly interest in the work declined during much of the 20th century.

However, the authenticity of the Hatata has since been strongly defended by multiple Ethiopian and international scholars. Amsalu Aklilu and Alemayehu Moges argued for its Ethiopian origin based on its secular tone, syntactic structure, and the particularities of its Geʽez usage.

Philosopher Claude Sumner rejected the forgery claim in 1976, presenting newly discovered letters by Urbino archived in Rome. He offered statistical and philological evidence showing that the ideas expressed in the Hatata diverged significantly from Urbino’s known theological views and exceeded his demonstrated proficiency in Geʽez. Sumner also pointed to differing biblical citation patterns between the two treatises (Hatata Zera Yacob and Hatata Walda Heywat) as further indication of dual authorship.

As of the late 20th and early 21st centuries, the majority of scholars support Zara Yaqob as the authentic author of the Hatata, and the forgery hypothesis is widely regarded as outdated and lacking in substantive evidence.

== See also ==
- Walda Heywat, his successor
