= Cultural center =

Organization or building that promotes culture and arts

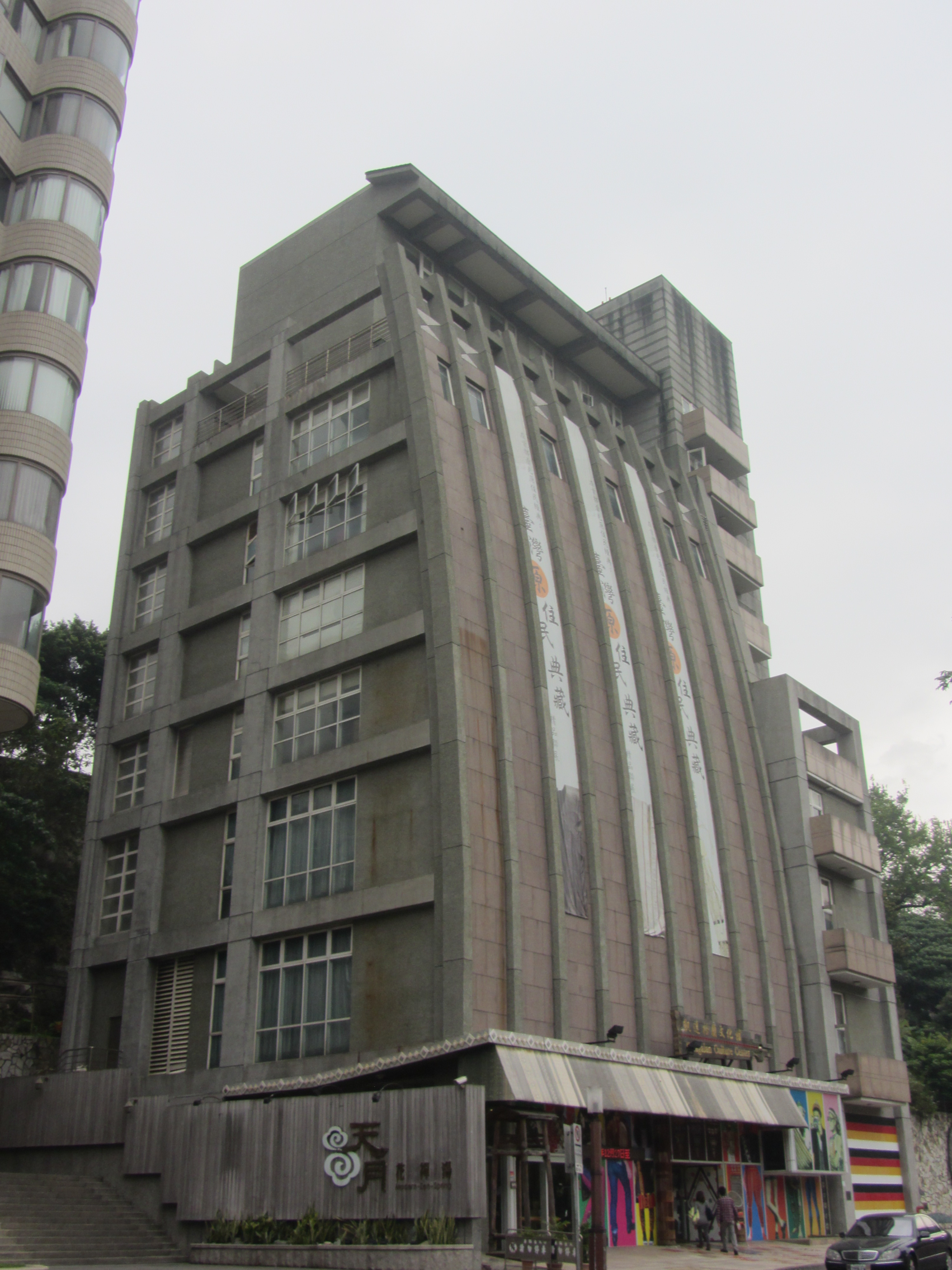
Ketagalan Culture Center in Taiwan.

A cultural center or cultural centre is an organization, building or complex that promotes culture and arts. Cultural centers can be neighborhood community arts organizations, private facilities, government-sponsored, or activist-run.

== History and scope ==
Cultural centers typically offer programming that may include visual art exhibitions, performing arts venues, film screenings, libraries, educational workshops, and public lectures, often with the goal of broadening access to cultural participation across a community.

The concept of a dedicated public space for cultural life has roots in the civic institutions of antiquity, though the modern cultural center as a distinct institution emerged primarily in the twentieth century, shaped in part by postwar urban development projects and national efforts to invest in public culture. Governments in many countries established large-scale cultural complexes as symbols of civic identity; notable examples include the John F. Kennedy Center for the Performing Arts in Washington, D.C. (opened 1971), the Centre Georges Pompidou in Paris (inaugurated 1977), and the Queensland Cultural Centre in Brisbane (completed 1988). Smaller community-based centers have similarly proliferated as vehicles for cultural preservation, arts education, and social cohesion, particularly in communities with distinct ethnic, linguistic, or regional identities.

Cultural centers are distinguished from museums and performing arts venues by their multipurpose character. The term is used internationally, though analogous institutions may be called a maison de la culture (France), a Kulturhaus (German-speaking countries), or a casa de cultura (Latin America and Spain).

== Africa ==
- Bibliotheca Alexandrina, Alexandria, Egypt
- Fendika Cultural Center, Addis Ababa, Ethiopia
- National Cultural Center, Kumasi, Ghana
- Wole Soyinka Centre for Culture and the Creative Arts, Lagos, Nigeria
- Guga S'Thebe Arts & Cultural Centre, Cape Town, South Africa
- Ndere Cultural Center, Kampala, Uganda
- Uganda National Cultural Centre, Kampala, Uganda

== Asia ==
- Central Cultural Center (CCC), Dhaka, Bangladesh
- Hong Kong Cultural Centre, Hong Kong, China
- Municipal Market of Baucau, Baucau, East Timor
- Cultural Center by Talenmark Developers, Calicut, India
- Nandan, Kolkata, India
- Rabindra Bhawan, Ranchi, India
- Rabindra Sadan, Kolkata, India
- Dhanadhanya Auditorium, Kolkata, India
- Nita Mukesh Ambani Cultural Centre, Mumbai, India
- Kohima Capital Cultural Center, Kohima, India
- Telugu Saamskruthika Niketanam, Visakhapatnam, India
- Bentara Budaya Jakarta, Jakarta, Indonesia
- Bentara Budaya Yogyakarta, Yogyakarta, Indonesia
- Bahman Cultural Center, Tehran, Iran
- Taiwan Cultural Center, Tokyo, Japan
- Tokyo Korean Culture Center, Tokyo, Japan
- Jaber Al-Ahmad Cultural Center, Kuwait City, Kuwait
- Sheikh Abdullah Al-Salem Cultural Centre, Salmiya, Kuwait
- Palestinian Heritage Center, Bethlehem, Palestine
- Cultural Center of the Philippines, Pasay, Philippines
- King Abdulaziz Center for World Culture, Dhahran, Saudi Arabia
- Singapore Chinese Cultural Centre (SCCC), Singapore
- Jaffna Thiruvalluvar Cultural Centre, Jaffna, Sri Lanka
- Beigang Cultural Center, Yunlin, Taiwan
- Japanese Cultural Center, Taipei, Taiwan
- Kaohsiung Cultural Center, Kaohsiung, Taiwan
- Keelung Cultural Center, Keelung, Taiwan
- Ketagalan Culture Center, Taipei, Taiwan
- Lukang Culture Center, Lukang, Taiwan
- Mongolian and Tibetan Cultural Center, Taipei, Taiwan
- Taichung City Dadun Cultural Center, Taichung, Taiwan
- Taichung Municipal City Huludun Cultural Center, Taichung, Taiwan
- Tainan Municipal Cultural Center, Tainan, Taiwan
- Xinying Cultural Center, Tainan, Taiwan
- Bangkok Art and Culture Centre, Bangkok, Thailand
- Thailand Cultural Centre, Bangkok, Thailand
- Atatürk Cultural Center, Istanbul, Turkey

== Europe ==
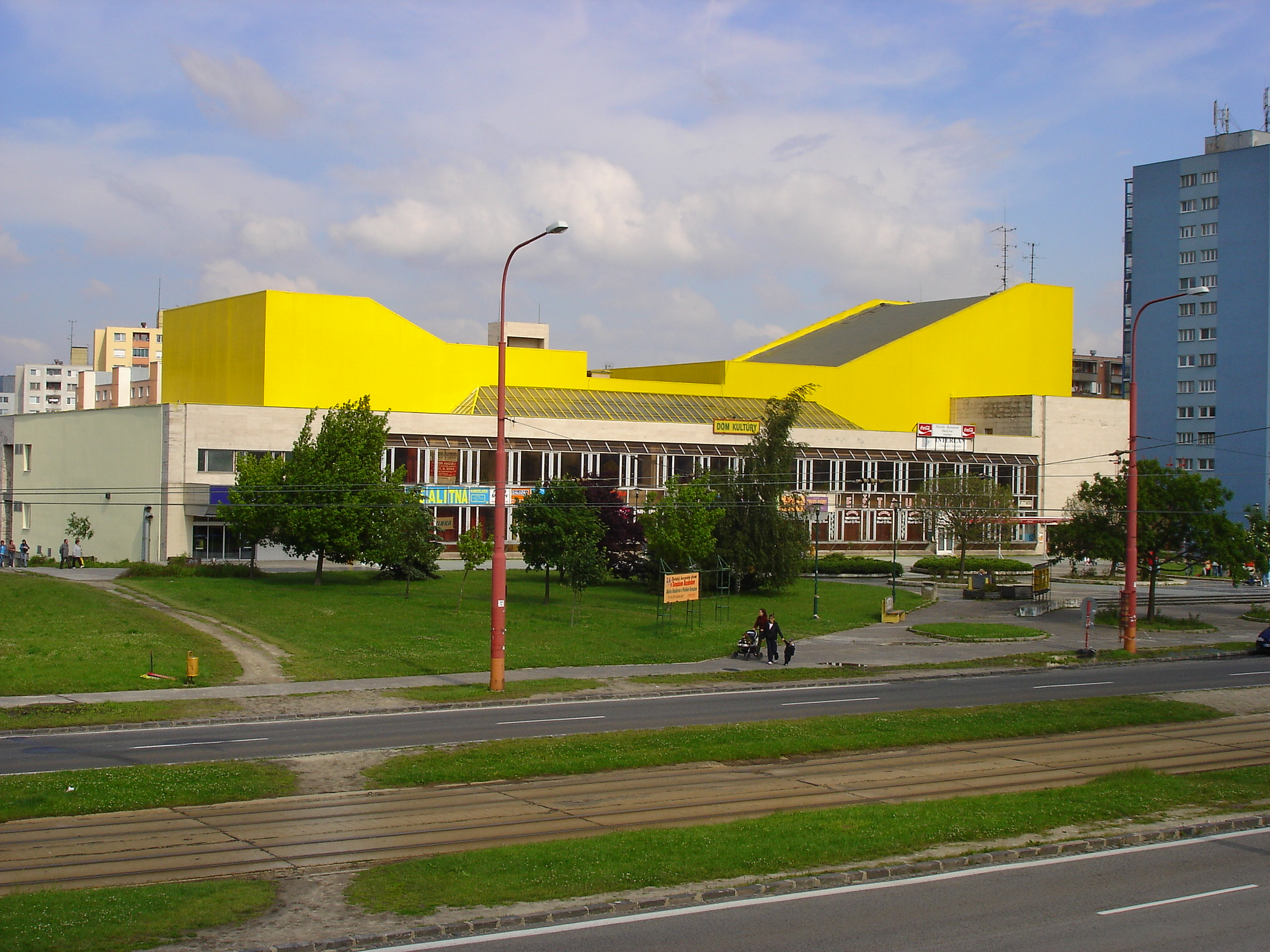
House of Culture Dúbravka in Bratislava, Slovakia

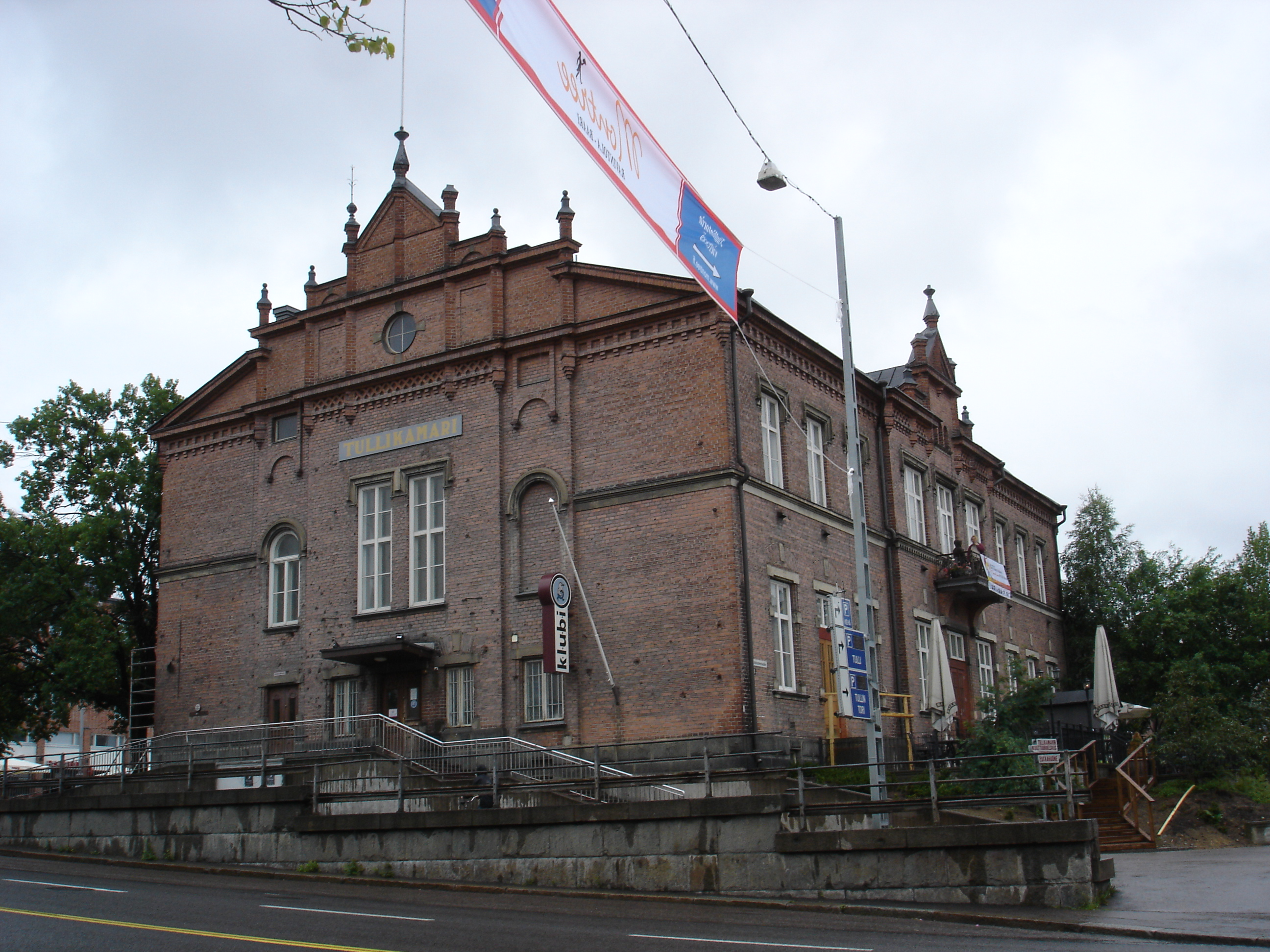
The Cultural Centre of the Old Customs House in Tampere, Finland

- Vooruit, Ghent, Belgium
- National Palace of Culture, Sofia, Bulgaria
- Kulturværftet, Helsingør, Denmark
- Tullikamari Cultural Centre, Tampere, Finland
- Centre Georges Pompidou, Paris, France
- Gasteig, Munich, Germany
- Stavros Niarchos Foundation Cultural Center, Kallithea, Greece
- Letterkenny Regional Cultural Centre, Letterkenny, Ireland
- European Cultural Centre, Venice, Italy
- Nida Culture and Tourism Information Centre "Agila", Neringa, Lithuania
- Public institution Cultural center "Nikola Djurkovic", Kotor, Montenegro
- ACU, Utrecht, Netherlands
- De Balie, Amsterdam, Netherlands
- Glaspaleis, Heerlen, Netherlands
- OT301, Amsterdam, Netherlands
- Centro Cultural de Belem, Lisbon, Portugal
- Kuryokhin Center, Saint Petersburg, Russia
- Cultural Center of the City of Bor, Bor, Serbia
- Dom omladine Beograda, Belgrade, Serbia
- Matadero Madrid, Madrid, Spain

== North America ==
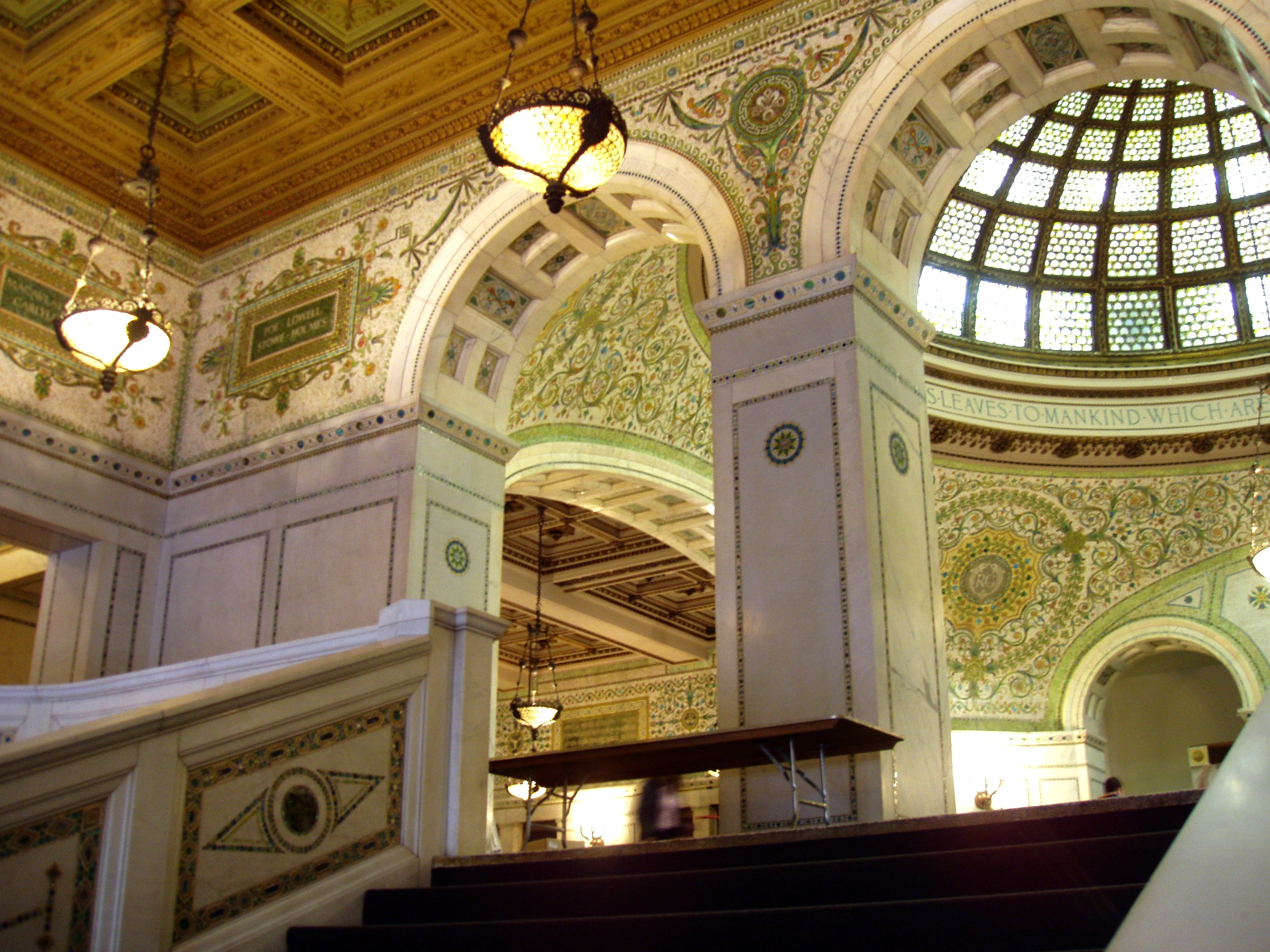
Chicago Cultural Center

- Casa de la Cultura, Puebla, Mexico
- Centro Cultural Mexiquense, Toluca, Mexico
- Polyforum Cultural Siqueiros, Mexico City, Mexico
- Tijuana Cultural Center, Tijuana, Mexico
- Centro Cultural Baudilio Vega Berríos, Mayagüez, Puerto Rico
- Asheville Culture Project, Asheville, North Carolina, United States
- Centro Cultural de la Raza, San Diego, California, United States
- Chicago Cultural Center, Chicago, Illinois, United States
- Cultural Arts Center, Columbus, Ohio, United States
- Cultural Center of Charlotte County, Port Charlotte, Florida, United States
- Detroit Cultural Center, Detroit, Michigan, United States
- El Centro Cultural de Mexico, Santa Ana, California, United States
- El Museo del Barrio, New York City, United States
- Eyedrum, Atlanta, Georgia, United States
- Greensboro Cultural Center, Greensboro, North Carolina, United States
- Howland Cultural Center, Beacon, New York, United States
- ISSUE Project Room, New York City, United States
- Kansas City Irish Center, Kansas City, Missouri, United States
- La Casita Cultural Center, Syracuse, New York, United States
- La Peña Cultural Center, Berkeley, California, United States
- Merced Multicultural Arts Center, Merced, California, United States
- Nā ʻAikāne o Maui Cultural and Research Center, Lahaina, Hawaii, United States
- Park Performing Arts Center, Union City, New Jersey, United States
- Polynesian Cultural Center, Lāʻie, Hawaii, United States
- Russian Cultural Center, Washington, D.C., United States
- Self Help Graphics & Art, Los Angeles, California, United States
- The Kitchen, New York City, United States
- Central Park Performing Arts Center, Largo, Florida, United States
- Tia Chucha's Centro Cultural, Los Angeles, California, United States
- Ugly Mermaid Venue & Cultural Centre, Eau Claire, Wisconsin, United States
- William V. Musto Cultural Center, Union City, New Jersey, United States

== Oceania ==
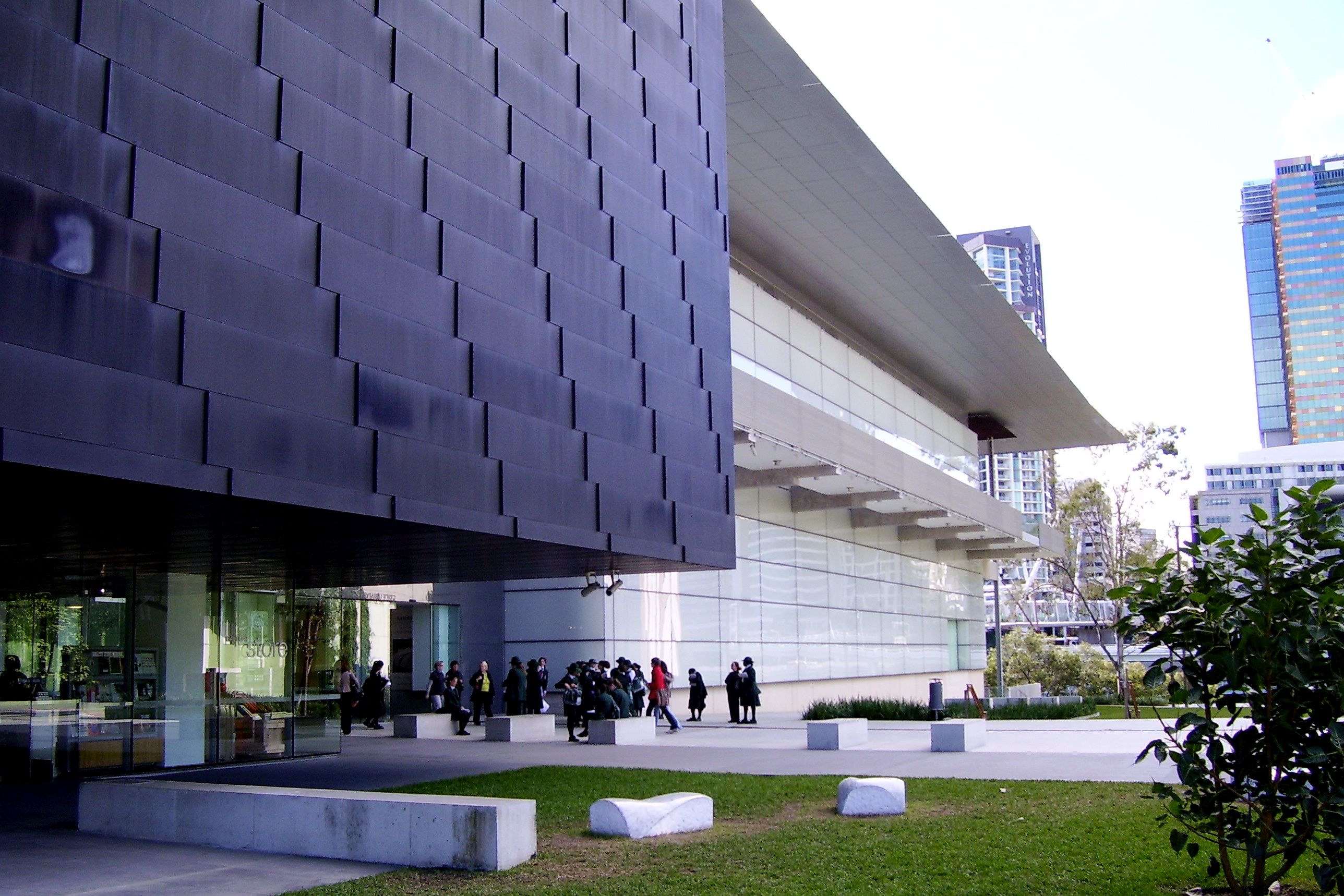
GOMA, Brisbane is the largest art gallery in Australia

- Perth Cultural Centre, Perth, Australia
- Queensland Cultural Centre, Brisbane, Australia
- Ngarachamayong Culture Center, Koror, Palau
- Vanuatu Cultural Centre, Port Vila, Vanuatu

== South America ==
- America Cultural Center, Salta, Argentina
- Centro Cultural Recoleta, Buenos Aires, Argentina
- Centro Cultural General San Martín, Buenos Aires, Argentina
- Libertad Palace, Domingo Faustino Sarmiento Cultural Center, Buenos Aires, Argentina
- Centro Cultural Banco do Brasil, Brasília, Belo Horizonte, Rio de Janeiro, and São Paulo, Brazil
- Ema Gordon Klabin Cultural Foundation, São Paulo, Brazil
- São Paulo Cultural Center, São Paulo, Brazil
- Agustín Ross Cultural Center, Pichilemu, Chile
- Centro Cultural Gabriela Mistral, Santiago, Chile
- Centro Cultural Palacio de La Moneda, Santiago, Chile
- Centro Cultural Metropolitano, Quito, Ecuador
- Cultural Center of the Republic "El Cabildo", Asunción, Paraguay
- Centro Cultural de Lima, San Borja District, Lima, Peru

== See also ==
- Community centre
- Infoshop
- Music venue
