= History of Mexican Americans in Los Angeles =

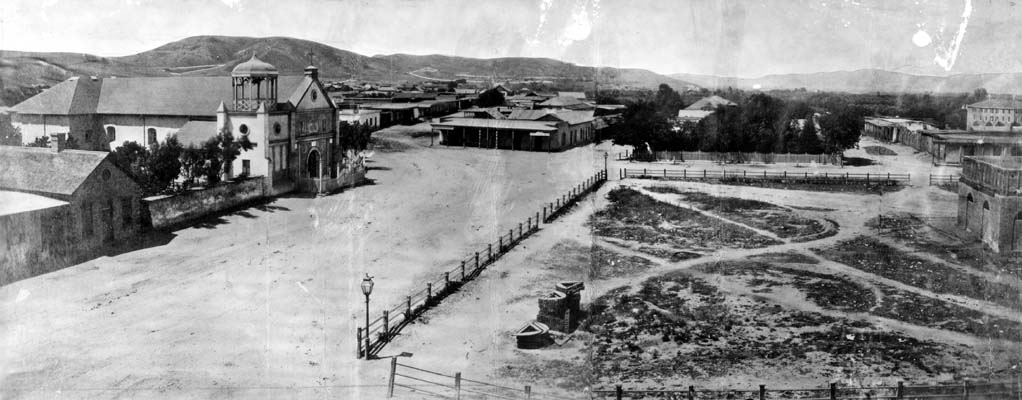
La Plaza, as seen from the Pico House, c.1869. The "Old Plaza Church" is to the left, the brick reservoir on the right, in the center of the plaza, was the original terminus of the Zanja Madre.

Mexican Americans have lived in Los Angeles since the original Pobladores. The 44 original settlers, 22 children, and 4 soldiers who founded the city in 1781 were almost exclusively from the current Mexican states of Sinaloa and Sonora. The history of Mexican Americans in Los Angeles spans from the original Spanish pueblo through its evolution into one of the largest urban centers in the United States. As of 2010, Latinos groups make up 48.5% of Los Angeles residents with people of Mexican descent accounting for 31.9% of the Latino population.

== History ==
=== Pre-colonial era ===
The modern history of present-day Los Angeles began with its original inhabitants, the Tongva people. Later known as the Gabrieleño people, they maintained their village thousands of years prior to initial Spanish contact. During the time right before European arrival, the Tongva inhabited an area of about 2,500 square miles with around 75 settlements and 5,000 people. The primary Tonga village, Yang-na, was located on the west bank of the Los Angeles River, remarked as the wealthiest and most sophisticated social settlement in the region.

In August 2, 1769, the Gaspar de Portolá Expedition reached the Tongva. Spanish explorers Gaspar de Portolá along with Franciscan Padres Junipero Serra and Juan Crespí finished the first land expedition from Mexico to San Diego, reaching the Tongva settlements. The Tongva managed their land through controlled agricultural burning, leading to the initial Spanish christening as the Bay of Smokes. During the expedition, the Spanish took note of the Los Angeles River, renaming it as El Río de Nuestra Señora la Reina de Los Angeles de Porciúncula. During the expedition, Spanish settlers took note of the surrounding fertile lands that would later ensure a permanent colonial output in 1781.

=== Spanish colonial era (1781) ===
Governor Felipe de Neve was appointed governor by Viceroy Bucareli to establish independent settlements in Alta California. In 1777, after a visit north of Monterrey, de Neve commissioned plans for a new pueblo in a valley of the Poriuncula River. He kept in mind the motivations for agricultural industries to provide supplies locally instead of having them imported or transported from abroad.

Part of the establishment consisted of recruiting the first settlers of the new pueblo. Captain Fernando River y Moncada was tasked with finding a total of 24 families from the northwestern Mexican provinces to travel and eventually populate the new Californian settlement. He fell short of 24, finding 11 families from Sonora and Sinaloa to compose the pobladores of Los Angeles. The adult pobladores consisted of one Spaniard, one Criollo, one Mestizo, two Negroes, eight mulattos, and nine Indians. On September 4, 1781, when all of the original settlers had arrived to the settlement, it was officially founded as El Pueblo de la Reina de Los Ángeles. In its early years, the pueblo relied heavily on Indian labor from the Yang-a village, establishing an initial mutual relationship between the local populations and the settlers.

Nuestra Señora Reina de los Angeles Asistencia was founded in early 1784 within the burgeoning Pueblo de Los Ángeles as an asistencia (or "sub-mission") to the nearby Mission San Gabriel Arcángel.

=== Mexican rule (1821) ===
Following Mexico gained independence from Spain in 1821, El Pueblo de Los Angeles entered an era of socio-political transformation. By this time, it had popularly become known as Los Angeles and expanded as a Mexican town through social influences from the south. The physical distance between Los Angeles and its ruling governments in Mexico City and Monterey allowed the city to shape its own legal and cultural identity. The pueblo managed most of its own affairs through an ayuntamiento (council) led by an alcalde. The town established itself as a prominent rancho center and started to draw in European and American men who assimilated into the local culture.

One of the most profound changes to the region's social landscape happened with the secularization of the missions and mission land in 1834. Secularization dismantled the socio-political structure that gave mission padres power and land, creating a new ruling class of Spanish-speaking settlers later named rancheros.

While mission lands was also intended to be kept in a legal trust for Indigenous people, a biased administrative system only ever distributed less than 10% of land to these groups. Instead, the Mexican government issued more than five hundred land grants to families in California, who transformed the agricultural region into extensive economic network. The new economy was centered on hide and tallow trade. Growth of the hide and tallow industry coincided and was supported by the industrial revolutions in Europe and the United States, where leather and tallow became popularized commodities for footwear and candles. The labor intensive aspect of the economy relied on indigenous workers who had become displaces following secularization. Many former mission indigenous men became vaqueros (cowboys) and domestic workers on ranchos, often living in a system of inherited debt.

The California identity emerged around the prestige of ranching lifestyle. The new ruling class and social elite established a new social hierarchy where Californios considered themselves racially and socially superior distinct from the local Indians and Mexican immigrants. Social class was not determined by racial identifiers but was rather anchored in wealth, family alliance and political influence. The Pico family were part of the Californio class and one of the elite families of the time. Santiago de la Cruz Pico and his family were one of the first families to arrive in Los Angeles and became one of the most prominent settler families in Los Angeles. Pico's son Pío de Jesús was born in the San Gabriel Mission in 1801 and had distinct African, Indian, and Spanish heritage. His status as a Californio played a large part in his political career. Pío Pico served as governor of Alta California in 1832 and again in 1845, known as the last governor of Alta California. By the mid-19th century, Pío and his brother Andrés Pico owned a combined 532,000 acres of land, amassing part of the largest fortunes of the region before American conquest.

=== Treaty of Guadalupe Hidalgo (1848) ===
The Treaty of Guadalupe Hidalgo in 1848 officially ended the Mexican-American War and promised protected property rights for Mexican citizens. Article IX specified that Mexicans remaining in ceded territory were guaranteed full rights as U.S. citizens with protected liberty and property rights. Under the treaty, Mexican citizens were legally categorized as "white", though their status and legal protections were often ignored in court battles to claim citizenship and land. The California Land Act of 1851 forced a burden of proof onto rancheros to legally validate their ownership of land titles. These aggressive legal processes left many Spanish-speaking rancheros at a disadvantage in English-speaking court. Senator William M. Gwin, the law's author, later admitted the law was designed to challenge and disposes Mexican rancheros off their land. Court litigations were expensive and drawn-out, forcing even elite families to mortgage or sell large parts of their estates to pay legal fees and property taxes.

Post 1849 Gold Rush, roughly 100,000 Anglo settlers flocked to Los Angeles and expanded establishments outside of the original plaza. As more Anglo establishments expanded around the plaza, the demographics of the town became clearly separated, concentrating the Spanish-speaking populations in a ten-block community named "Sonora Town". By the 1880s, "Sonora Town" or "Little Mexico" had become a physically and socially isolated Mexican enclave. While the barrio often provided a sense of cultural familiarity for its residents, it was also subject to economic prejudice and neglect by city officials. Anglo neighborhoods received better public services and city officials went as far as considering destroying cultural landscape to make room for the increasing Anglo populations.

In the 1850s, Los Angeles was characterized by the highest murder rate in the nation, with some years averaging about one murder per day. Vigilante groups like the "El Monte Boys" often targeted Mexicans and Indians in raids of local barrios. Vigilante groups like the "El Monte Boys" were often composed of Texans and anti-Mexican ideals, using the guise of maintaining legal order to justify lynching events. In one such infamous lynching, vigilante groups hung Reyes Feliz and Cipriano Sandoval under murder charges. Both were later proved innocent. Spanish-speaking press emerged in protest of lynchings and injustices committed around the late 1850s. El Clamor Público was the city's first Spanish-language newspaper. Its founder seventeen year old Francisco Ramirez was a vocal critic of the "Linchocracia" (Lynchocracy) and existing justice system.

At the start of the 20th century, much of California underwent a cultural trend known as the Spanish Fantasy, which was a cultural and artistic trend of embracing the Spanish heritage of California. This trend included architecture movements using Spanish architectural styles, mainly of which being the Spanish Missions. The Spanish Fantasy embraced Spain’s participation in the shaping of California while ignoring the role of Mexicans. Mexican heritage would be embraced later through Hispanization.

=== Early 20th century ===
==== 1900-World War I ====
During 1910-1920, Mexican immigrants came to the Southwestern United States settling in locations like Texas and Southern California as a result of the Mexican Revolution. In October 1913, numbers as high as 8,000 Mexicans crossed from Piedras Negras, Coahuila, to Eagle Pass, Texas. While many Mexican refugees were entering into the United States, State-sponsored jobs in partnership with the Mexican government motivated Mexican immigrants to migrate to Los Angeles.

==== Post-World War I (1920s-30s) ====
Post-World War I fear of communism manifested itself in Los Angeles through an increased nationalistic, anti-immigrant sentiment that would be expressed in education programs aimed at Mexican Americans, as well as urban development aimed at removing Mexican identity. While prominent politicians such as former governor Hiram Johnson and activist Simon Lubin advocated for progressive policies, such as women's rights and labor rights, local politics of Los Angeles county and California at large leaned conservative, with governor Friend W. Richardson reallocating the Americanization programs to the California Department of Education in 1923. The goal of these Americanization programs was to assimilate immigrants into "the American way of life" and particularly targeted Mexican immigrants because of their perceived ethnic proximity to Europeans relative to other immigrant groups, such as the Chinese and Japanese; the main way this was achieved was through the instruction of the English language. At first, these programs prioritized Mexican men, registering them through their workplaces, but because of the seasonal nature of farm work, teaching English successfully was not possible.

Aligning with the American ideal of Republican motherhood, assimilation efforts were eventually redirected toward Mexican women, who were usually in charge of the home and more involved in community institutions like schools than Mexican men. The new goal of Americanization programs then became training Mexican women for domestic work, to help "alleviate the shortage of housemaids, seamstresses, laundresses, and service workers." By making Mexican women, the homemakers, more American, Americanists hoped that Mexican culture would slowly phase out of immigrants' lives; for example, replacing tortillas with bread during meals. These efforts to push Mexican women into newly-profitable, domestic work outside of the home was met with resistance, which Americanists attributed to machismo in Mexican culture. When naturalization rates of Mexican immigrants did not improve, Americanization programs shifted focus yet again to the implementation of Americanization curriculum in schools, in an effort to teach American values to American-born children of Mexican immigrants. Despite these programs promising full integration into American society, they only provided "idealized versions of American values" and second-class citizenship, as Mexican immigrants continued to face economic disenfranchisement and their children received an unequal education to their white counterparts.

Urban development efforts in Los Angeles, as well as the greater California region, were also influenced by the rising anti-immigrant sentiment as according to Phoebe S. Kropp. According to Kropp, Los Angeles engaged in construction projects to "reenvisioned the region’s nineteenth-century Spanish and Mexican history." The historical landmark Olvera Street is an example of these efforts, as "Olvera Street was 'A Mexican Street of Yesterday in a City of Today.'"

All of these sentiments, along other factors, would eventually result in the Repatriation efforts from the Federal Government following the Stock Market Crash of 1929. During this time, many Mexicans and Mexican American citizens were deported or self-deported to Mexico. In Los Angeles and the Los Angeles county area, social programs and agencies provided bus and train tickets to Mexico. Deportation raids were a common occurrence in Los Angeles, including one raid on Olvera Street.

=== WWII era (1940s) ===
Agricultural labor shortages associated with World War II brought on another wave of Mexican immigration to Los Angeles. The bracero program, or guest worker program, was a partnership between the US and Mexican governments, as well as American farms, to bring Mexican agricultural workers to the United States through labor contracts. With a demand for workers that exceeded the supply of labor contracts, the bracero program inadvertently became one of the origins of undocumented immigration from Mexico to the United States.

In urban areas of California, including Los Angeles, racial tensions were heightened as a result to changing urban developments and land seizures. In 1940, part of Chavez Ravine was seized to build a naval training school, and, according to Eduardo Pagan, disrupted communities and stood more as an "outpost standing watch over the surrounding enclaves of the local population." These tensions increased as servicemen would leave the outpost and venture into the city "transgressing the unspoken mores of the predominantly Mexican, African American, Italian, and Jewish neighborhoods that lined the downtown district." All of these resulted in several occurrences of violence known as the Zoot Suits Riot. The Zoot Suit Riots were a series of violent attacks between law enforcement, US servicemen and the Hispanic community, primarily Mexican men and teenagers. According to Pagan, these series of attacks can be seen as a struggle between a community and an occupying entity as much as they are gendered tensions between the need from all sides needing to present masculinity for the public during heated moments of conflict.

With the new Federal Housing Act of 1949, city officials and developers began targeting Mexican American neighborhoods in Los Angeles for private and public developments. Housing officials constructed a housing crisis for the working-class using misleading imagery to justify clearing existing neighborhoods. Residents in targeted areas were pressured to sell property, most of whom were predominantly Mexican American families. One of the targeted enclaves were the Bishop, La Loma, and Palo Verde neighborhoods where city officials proposed a public housing project with newly cleared and acquired land. Because of prevalent Cold War sentiments, the city's conservative "Old Guard" attacked the low income public housing project, favoring private interests instead.

After the project was canceled, the city used the power of eminent domain to transfer land to Walter O'Malley as incentive to draw in the Brooklyn Dodgers to Los Angeles. Despite institutionalized bias and lack of legal protections, many families resisted the pressure to leave, until their forced eviction. On May 1959, all the remaining residents were physically removed by the LA Sheriff's department, most notably the Aréchiga family, as bulldozers waited nearby to demolish any remaining structures.

=== Chicano movement (1968) ===
The Chicano Movement or El Movimiento, was a nationwide movement in the United States during which Mexican Americans encouraged political and social protest against institutional bias and rejected cultural assimilation. Although the label "Chicano" had a pejorative origin, it was reclaimed by younger activists as a symbol of political identification challenging the status quo. In Los Angeles, the movement gained traction over moral outrage of the unequal treatment towards Mexican American veterans and their disproportionately high casualty rate in the Vietnam War.

One of the earliest manifestations of the movement was in the 1968 East L.A. Walkouts, or "Blowouts", when over 10,000 students at Belmont, Wilson, Garfield, Roosevelt, and Lincoln High Schools walked out to protest unequal educational conditions. Students protested the lack of standardized educational conditions, citing a 50% high school dropout rate and curriculum that lacked Mexican American contributions. One central figure for the protest was Sal Castro, a Lincoln High teacher who helped mentor student leaders craft critiques of the LAUSD. Some of these critiques targeted neglect from school officials and demanded Mexican American inclusion in staff and curriculum.

The peaceful walkouts were met with heavy police response that increased the overall tension between law enforcement and the Mexican American community.Law enforcement indicted thirteen activist and organizers, later known as the "East LA Thirteen" on felony conspiracy charges for their roles in the demonstrations. The indicted group included student activists and members of the Brown Berets, led by David Sánchez. The indictments were criticized as part of the attempt to suppress political activism within the Chicano community and were later deemed unconstitutional.

The movement in Los Angeles reached its peak on August 19, 1970 during the National Chicano Moratorium, an anti-war rally in East Los Angeles. More than 30,000 demonstrators gathered to protests the disproportionate number of Chicano soldiers dying in the Vietnam War. Law enforcement disrupted the rally at Laguna Park, and swept through the park using military tactics to disband the rally. As officers aggressively shut down the protest, they created a stampede as demonstrators tried to flee the park. During the chaos, Ruben Salazar was killed at the Silver Dollar Bar after the continued aggressive efforts of the LA Sheriff's department to end the rally. Many Chicanos believed Salazar was deliberately targeted because of his work on corrupt police-community interactions.

After the 1960s, political activism led to a rise in educational interest for Chicano academics and arts. One of the core goals for student protests during the Chicano Movement was the creation of studies of ethnic minorities. Chicano Studies departments were established nationwide through the Plan of Santa Barbara in 1969. Street murals in Los Angeles became intertwined with social justice issues and led to the creation of key collectives like Asco. Luis Valdez's Teatro Campesino used art and poetry to target issues of social consciousness.

=== Immigration in the late 20th century ===
The social landscape of Los Angeles shifted after the Immigration and Nationality Act of 1965, which eliminated the nationality quotas that had favored European immigration to the US. This policy marked the beginning of the "Fourth Wave" of immigration, marked by an influx of migrants from Latin America and Asia and specified family-oriented policies. By the 1980s, Los Angeles had become one of the primary urban destinations for migrants, specifically attracting Latino populations. The change in policy also increased the number of undocumented migrants entering the country. In response, Congress passed the Immigration Reform and Control Act (IRCA) as a way to mitigate the number of undocumented residents and deter future waves of migration. The IRCA granted a path to amnesty for the 3 million undocumented immigrants who could provide evidence of residency since 1982 in the US. At least 800,000 unauthorized immigrants in Los Angeles County were granted amnesty, 90% of whom were either Mexican or Central American. While the act regularized the status of millions, it also introduced employer sanctions for knowingly hiring undocumented workers. These sanctions led to workplace discrimination since employers began turning away anyone who appeared to be of Mexican descent. Despite this, the IRCA failed to deter migration from Mexico to the US because the demand for labor services and wage gaps continued to pull migrants towards the US.

The increasing number of immigrant populations in California triggered anti-immigrant sentiment that culminated in Proposition 187. Passed in 1994, the "Save our State" initiative was a California ballot measure intended to restrict undocumented immigrants' access to public services. It also required state employees to report any suspected undocumented person. The proposition mobilized hundreds of thousands of people to march and on October 16, 1994 more than 150,000 people marched down to City Hall in what was the largest demonstration in the history of Los Angeles. Three years after Prop 187 was passed, it was ruled unconstitutional by the California Supreme Court. The political landscape of California shifted away from conservatism post 1994 after increased political contributions from previously silent Latino and immigrant populations became politically active.

The city's original barrios were located in the eastern half of the city and the unincorporated community of East Los Angeles. The trend of Hispanization began in 1970, then accelerated in the 1980s and 1990s with immigration from Mexico and Central America (especially El Salvador, Honduras, and Guatemala). These immigrants settled in the city's eastern and southern neighborhoods. By 2000, South Los Angeles was a majority Mexican area, displacing most previous African-American and Asian-American residents. The city is often said to have the largest Mexican population outside Mexico and has the largest Spanish-speaking population outside Latin America or Spain. As of 2007, estimates of the number of residents originally from the Mexican state of Oaxaca ranged from 50,000 to 250,000. Montebello was the first Spanish settlement in California in Los Angeles County.

=== Contemporary LA ===
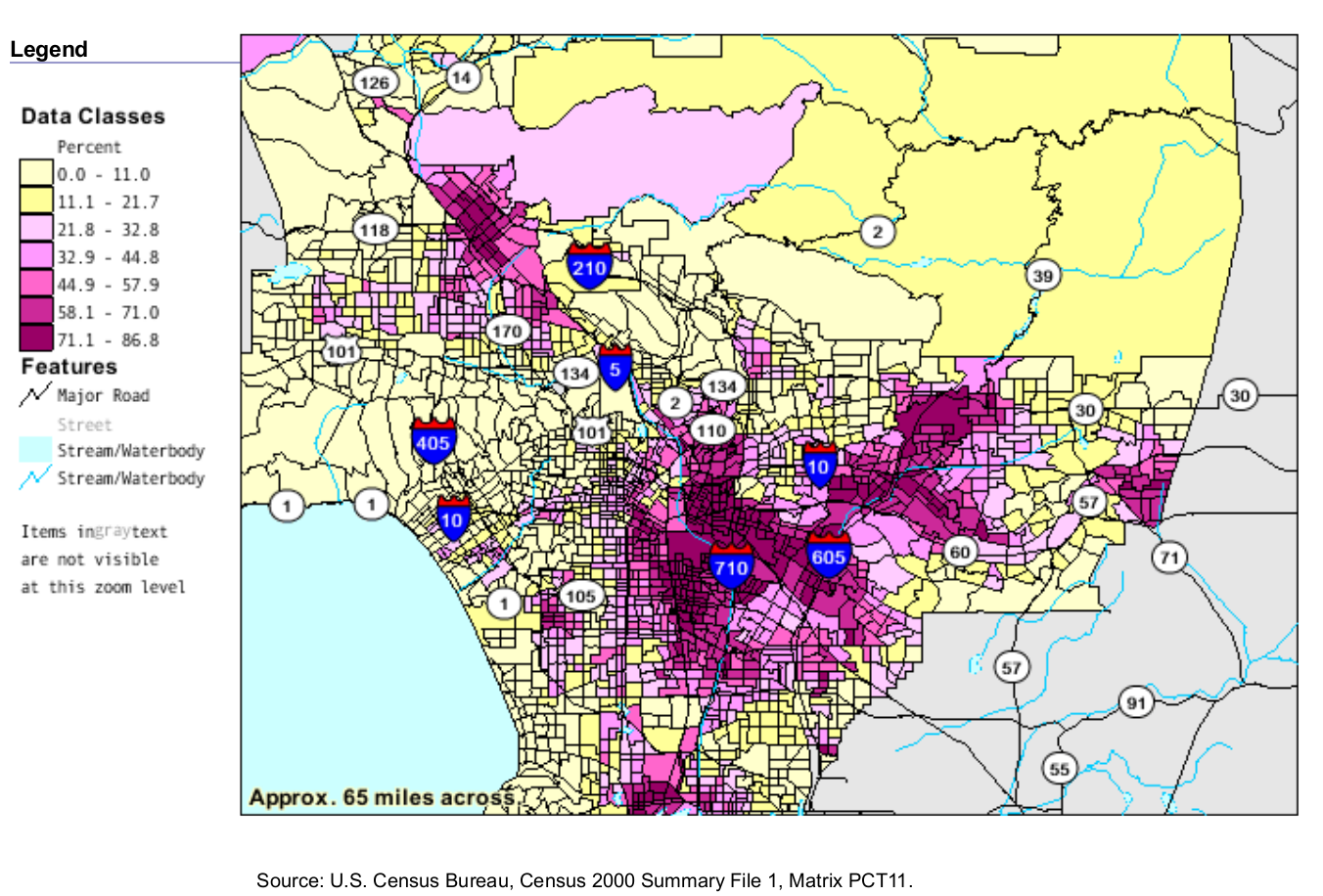
Census Bureau map (2000) of Los Angeles County showing percentage of population self-identified as Mexican in ancestry or national origin by census tracts. Heaviest concentrations are in East Los Angeles, Echo Park/Silver Lake, South Los Angeles, and San Pedro/Harbor City/Wilmington.

As of 2010, about 2.5 million residents of the Greater Los Angeles area are of Mexican American origin/heritage.

As of 1996 Mexican-Americans make up about 80% of the Latino population in the Los Angeles area. As of 1996 the Los Angeles region had around 3,736,000 people of Mexican origins.

There's a shift of second and third generation Mexican-Americans out of Los Angeles into nearby suburbs, such as Ventura County, Orange County, San Diego and the Inland Empire, California region. Mexican and other Latin American immigrants moved in East and South sections of L.A. and sometimes, Asian immigrants moved into historic barrios to become mostly Asian-American areas. Starting in the late 1980s, Downey has become a renowned Latino majority community in Southern California, and the majority of residents moved in were middle or upper-middle class, and second and third generation Mexican-Americans. The Mexican population is increasing in the Antelope Valley such as Palmdale.

Suburban cities in Los Angeles County like Azusa, Baldwin Park, City of Industry, Duarte, El Monte, Irwindale, La Puente, Montebello, Rosemead, San Gabriel, South Gate, South El Monte, West Covina, Whittier and especially Pomona have large a Mexican population.

By 2020 Downey, which was previously heavily Anglo (non-Latino) White, became known as the "Mexican Beverly Hills" due to housing wealthy people of Mexican origin. The Hispanic population increased after the Immigration Reform and Control Act of 1986. Erick Galindo in The New York Times described Downey as "an aspirational suburb for Latinos in Los Angeles." In 2020 Blanca Pacheco became the mayor; she was the first woman of Latin American origins to hold that position.

== Culture ==
Mexican Americans from Los Angeles have celebrated the Cinco de Mayo holiday since the 1860s. They, along with other Spanish-speaking peoples, celebrate the Day of the Three Wise Kings as a gift giving holiday.

Zoot suits were a staple of Mexican-American attire in the 1940s. Women who wore them, "forged a new identity based on independence, a more pronounced sexuality, and a sense of belonging to a distinctly Mexican American subculture."

Redz Bar was opened in 1953 in Boyle Heights, as primarily as a working class lesbian Latino bar.

In the 1990s the quebradita dancing style was popular among Mexican-Americans in Greater Los Angeles.

The El Centro Cultural de Mexico is located in Santa Ana.

Plaza Mexico is located in Lynwood.

Two films, Tortilla Soup and Real Women Have Curves, portray Mexican-American families in the Los Angeles area.

Another film that portrays the life of a Mexican-American in Los Angeles is Stand and Deliver, which demonstrates the life of Mexican-American high school students and how they get through their academic struggles, with the help of their teacher, Jaime Escalante (Edward James Olmos).

== Notable Mexican Americans from Los Angeles ==
- Constance Marie (actress)
- Pio Pico, last Californio governor (1840s).
- Rodolfo Acuña (scholar)
- Gustavo Arellano (publisher of the OC Weekly)
- Bobby Chacon (boxer, hall of fame member)
- Alexa Demie (actress)
- Rene Enriquez (mobster)
- Tom Fears (NFL player, hall of fame member)
- William A. Fraker (cinematographer, six-time Oscar nominee)
- Guy Gabaldon (U.S. Marine, WWII hero)
- Eric Garcetti (politician, Mayor of Los Angeles)
- Kid Frost (rapper)
- John Gavin (actor)
- Eduardo C. Gomez (U.S. Army, Medal of Honor recipient)
- David M. Gonzales (U.S. Army, Medal of Honor recipient)
- Pancho Gonzales (tennis legend)
- Genaro Hernández (boxer, world champion)
- Oscar De La Hoya (boxer, hall of fame member)
- Rebbeca Marie Gomez a.k.a. Becky G (actress)
- Emile Kuri (film set decorator, Oscar winner)
- Los Lobos (rock band)
- George Lopez (actor, comedian)
- Cheech Marin (actor)
- Miguel (singer)
- Yvette Mimieux (actress)
- Julia Goldani Telles (actress)
- Ricardo Montalbán (actor)
- Edward James Olmos (actor)
- Anthony Quinn (actor, two-time Oscar winner)
- Efren Ramirez (actor)
- Richard Ramirez (serial killer)
- Paul Rodriguez (skateboarder)
- Teresa Ruiz (actress)
- Zack de la Rocha (lead vocalist of the rock band Rage Against the Machine)
- Andy Russell (singer)
- Rubén Salazar (journalist)
- Angela Morales (writer)
- María Elena Salinas (journalist)
- Lupita Tovar (actress)
- Danny Trejo (actor)
- Ritchie Valens (singer and recording artist)
- Tiburcio Vásquez (bandit, folk hero to some)
- Antonio Villaraigosa (politician, Mayor of Los Angeles)

== See also ==
- Bibliography of California history
- Bibliography of Los Angeles
- Outline of the history of Los Angeles
- East Los Angeles
- Los Angeles Plaza
- Olvera Street
- El Mercado de Los Angeles
- Whittier Boulevard
- Siege of Los Angeles
- Battle of Chavez Ravine
- Zoot Suit Riots
- East L.A. walkouts
- Brown Berets
