= Lin Pey-Chwen =

Taiwanese female artist

Lin Pey-Chwen (born 1959) is a Taiwanese artist known for her career spanning over three decades, focusing on contemporary art, including women's art, installation art, and digital art. Lin's career spans over 30 years, focusing on contemporary art, including women's art, installation art, and digital art.

== Early life and career ==
Lin Pey-Chwen, was born in Ping-tong County, Taiwan, in 1959. She received her Doctor of Creative Arts from the University of Wollongong, Australia, in 1996. After returning to Taiwan from the US in 1989, Lin held her first solo exhibition at the American Cultural Center and became a member of the contemporary art group Apartment 2. In 1998, she published Women Art Discourse, a book on Taiwanese female artists, and co-founded the Taiwan Women's Art Association (TWAA), advocating for women in the Taiwanese art scene.

Lin's career expanded in 2010 when she began researching and curating exhibitions focused on digital art in Taiwan. She published the book Taiwan Digital Art E-Files.

Throughout her career Lin has been involved in academia, serving as a professor and dean at universities in Taiwan, including the National Taiwan University of Arts and China University of Technology. She continues to lead the Lin Pey-Chwen Digital Arts Lab (which primarily conducts diverse interdisciplinary creative experiments using digital art media and techniques).

== Artworks ==
Exposed to progressive ideas, Lin Pey Chwen developed a feminist consciousness through her experiences studying and working abroad. This awareness prompted her to use her artwork as a platform to advocate for women's rights, believing that women have the right to express their inner thoughts freely. Upon returning to Taiwan, she unveiled Speaking Through Painting at the Taipei Fine Arts Museum in 1995.

Lin's artistic vision is rooted in her feminist perspective, evident in her exploration of themes such as female oppression under patriarchy. Following the earthquake on September 21, 1999, known as 921 earthquake, Lin began delving into the relationship between humans and nature. This exploration culminated in her Return to Nature series, where she uses digital interfaces to depict the concept of "artificial nature", with butterflies serving as a central motif.

Lin began her Eve Clone series in 2006, envisioning and interpreting a post-human world. This series not only portrays feminine traits but also carries religious symbolism, relying heavily on digital technology while simultaneously critiquing the negative impacts of technology on society. The flawlessly perfect and hairless Eve appears both lifelike and artificial, embodying a state between organic and inorganic matter. Using the technique of 3D dynamic holographic photography, the Eve Clone series combines Eve's likeness with various animal forms, imbued with a mineral texture, to satirize the hidden dangers brought by technology and challenge societal constraints and restrictions imposed on the female body.

Exhibited from August 12 to September 2, 2011 as part of Lin's solo exhibition at Gallery Grand Siècle, the series includes four works: The Portrait of Eve Clone, Mass Production of Eve Clone, Revelation of Eve Clone, and The Inspection of Eve Clone.

== Selected exhibition ==
The Revelation of Eve Clone: Lin Pey-Chwen Digital Art Lab Exhibition, held at the Tainan Art Museum and B.B. ART in 2020, showcased Lin Pey-Chewn's acclaimed Eve Clone series. This series delves into themes of feminism, the interaction between humanity and technology, and religious allegory. The exhibition mainly showed Lin's thoughts related to Cyber sexualities issues, especially about cyborg. Lin's Eve Clone series also uses technology and multimedia to evoke fairy tales and imagination from the past, while provoking contemplation on human desires and the consequences of unchecked ambition. Eve Clone Series portrays social restrictions upon the female body as a symbol of trapped potential, critiquing the potential damage to mankind caused by technological advancements.

Her works were featured in exhibitions worldwide, including venues such as the Queens Museum in New York. She has received awards and recognitions for her contributions to new media art, including the Taiwan Chung-Shing Award, Taiwan Public Art Award, and the First Prize in the category of new media art at the Italy XII Florence Biennial of International Award in 2019.
