= Fendika Cultural Center =

Cultural center in Addis Ababa, Ethiopia

- ፈንድቃ
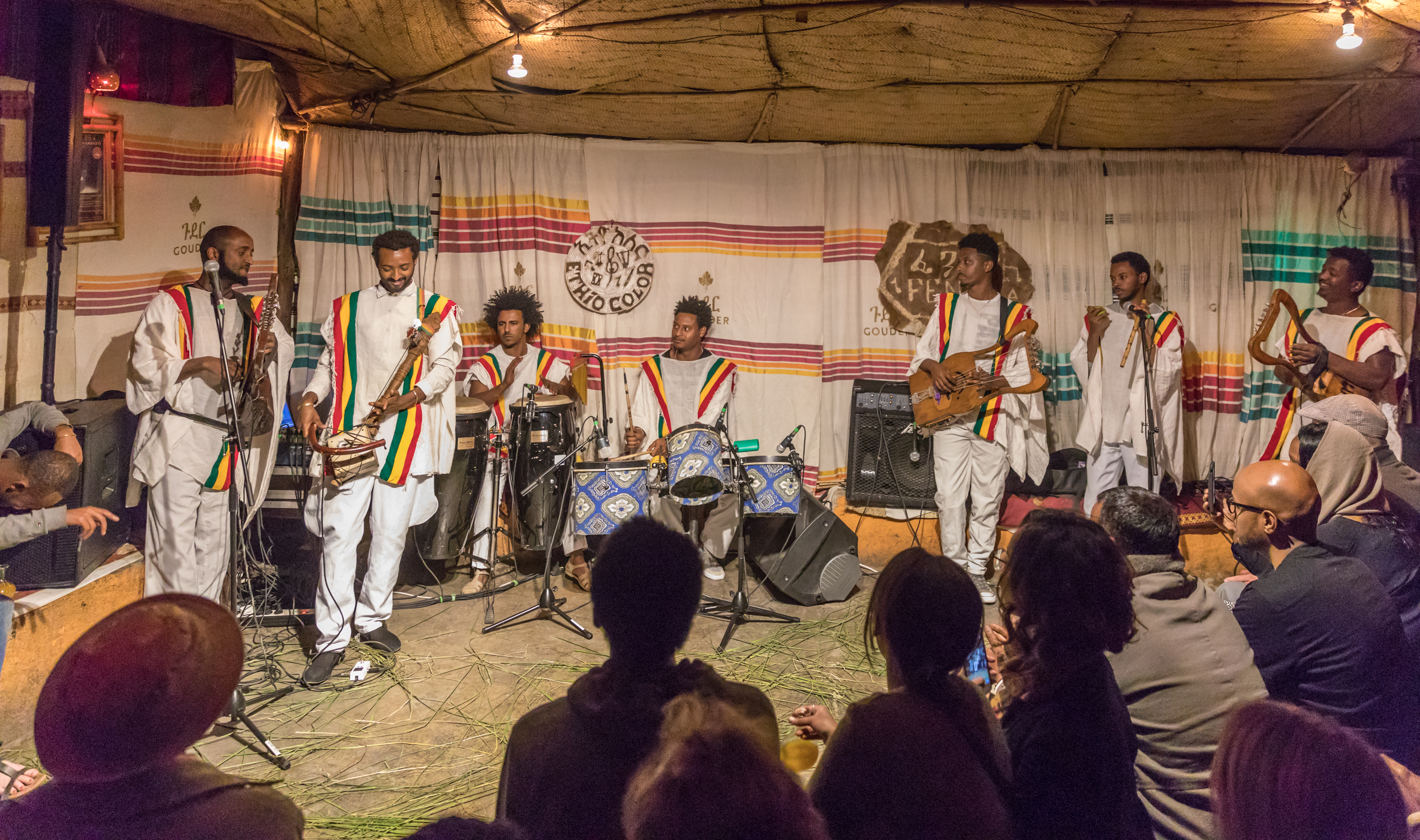
- Former names: Fendika Azmari Bet
- Location: Kirkos, Addis Ababa, Ethiopia
- Owner: Melaku Belay
- Type: cultural center

Construction
- Opened: 1990s
- Renovated: 2008
- Expanded: 2016

The Fendika Cultural Center (Amharic: ፈንድቃ) is a cultural center located in Kazanchis neighbourhood (Kirkos district) of Addis Ababa, Ethiopia. It was created as a folk music house (azmari bet) in the early 1990s.

Owned and run by Ethiopian dancer and choreographer Melaku Belay, Fendika Cultural Center is a cultural hub that offers classes, workshops, art exhibits, jazz nights, and cultural activities, beginning with displays of local painters and monthly poetry readings.

It hosts the shows of Fendika and the Ethiocolor, two Ethiopian music groups.

Since its renewal, Fendika organizes an annual street festival during Timket, the celebration of epiphany in January. In this event, Fendika Cultural Center invites indigenous artists from various parts of Ethiopia to perform their folk music and dance on the streets of the Ethiopian capital.

== History ==
This cultural center was originally built as azmari bet (In English "House of Azmaris", the Amharic name for an Ethiopian traditional music house).

Due to changes caused by urban development of Addis Ababa, Fendika remained one of the last folk music houses in Kazanchis neighbourhood in 2008. In this time, Melaku Belay began managing Fendika Azmari Bet, he converted Fendika into a more comprehensive performing arts center.

In 2016, Belay expanded this cultural space to establish of the Fendika Cultural Center.

In 2023, Fendika faces imminent demolition because the Addis Ababa City Administration plans to clear the land for a five-star hotel.

== Notable awards ==
- Prince Claus Award (2020).

== Gallery ==
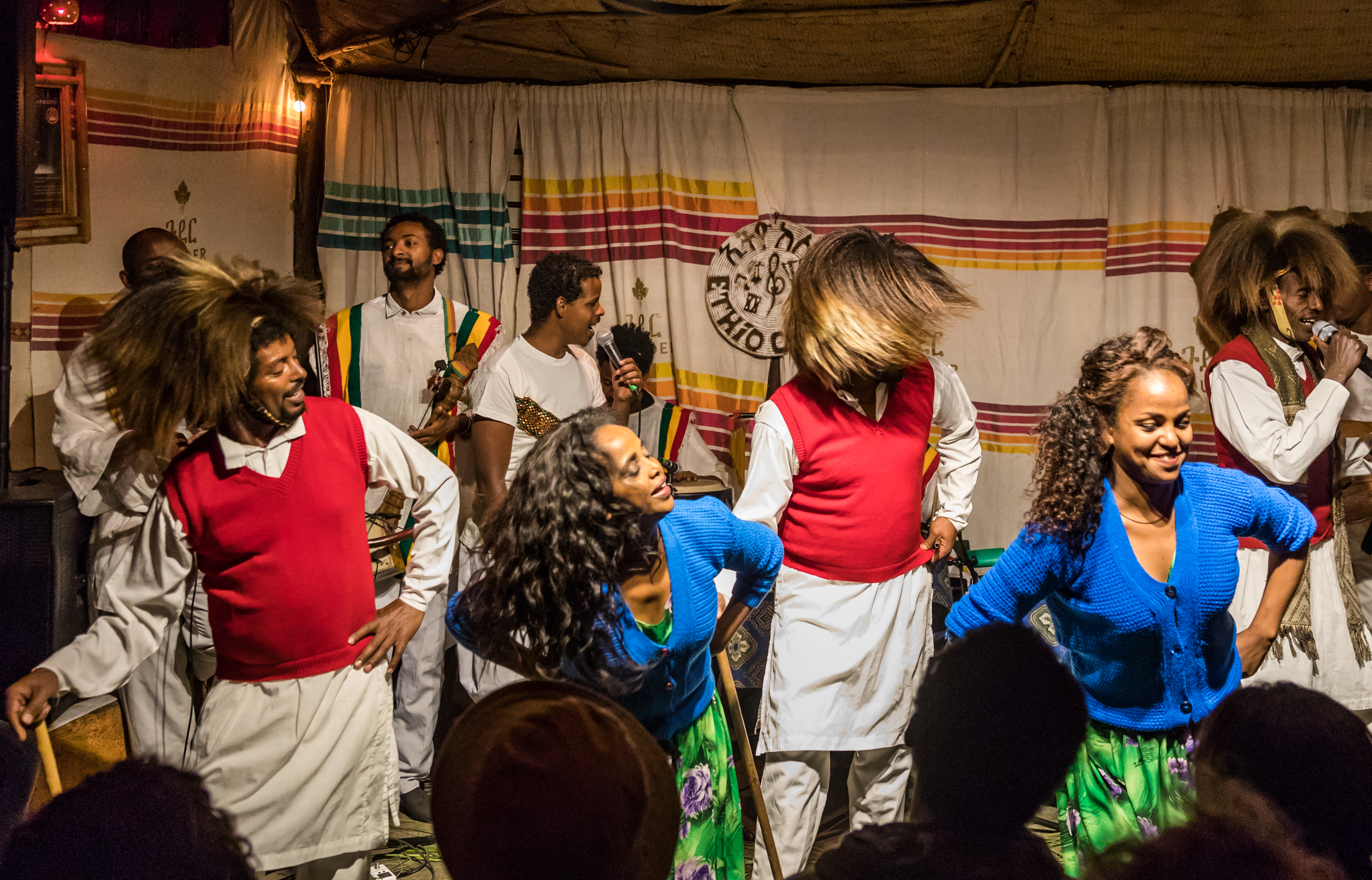

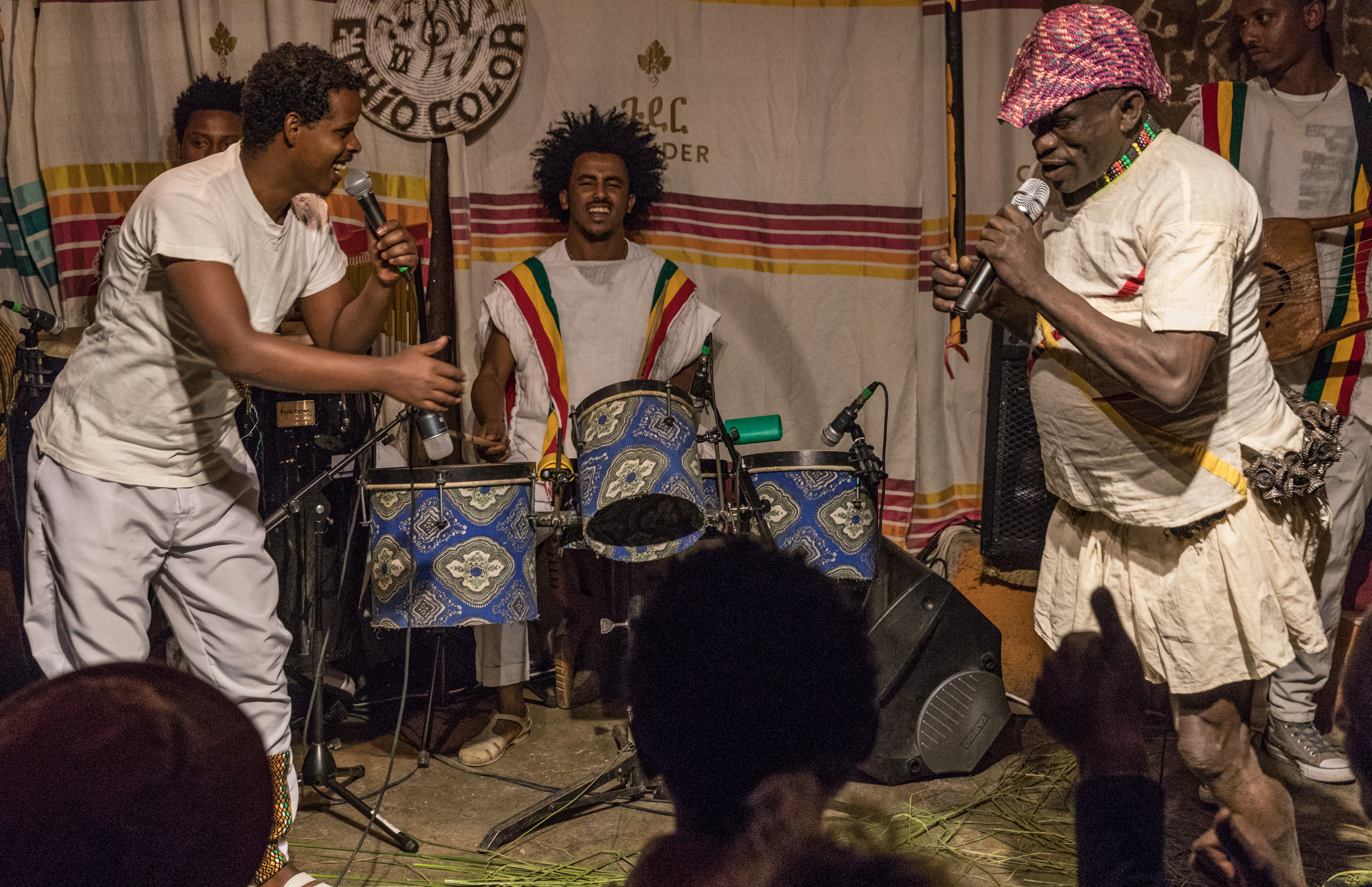

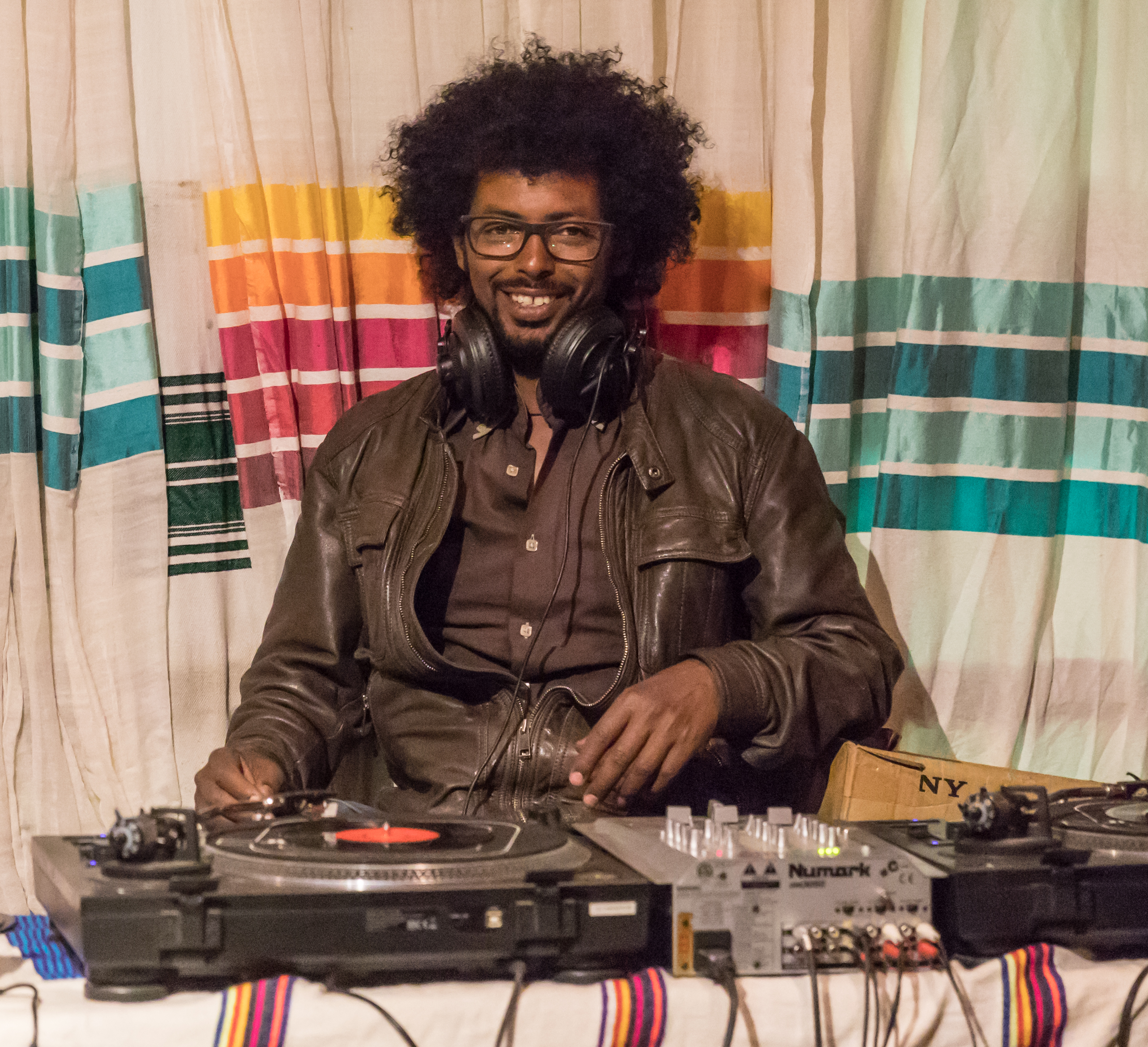
Melaku Belay

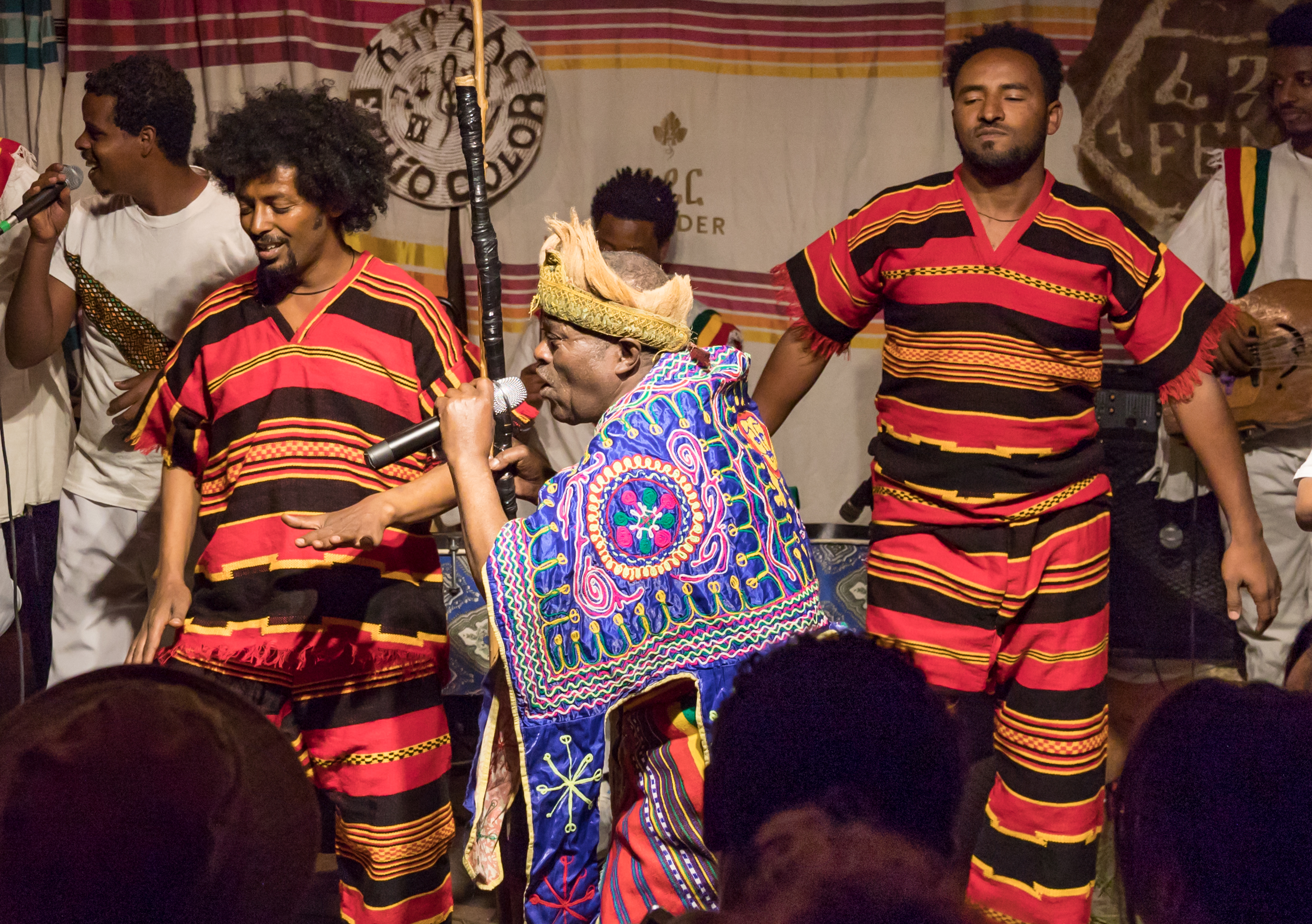

== See also ==
- Azmari
- Ethiopian National Theatre
- Hager Fikir Theatre
- Fendika
