= Melaku =

Melaku is an Ethiopian name. Notable people with the name include:

== Given name ==
- Melaku Belay, leader of the Ethiopian music group Fendika
- Melaku Worede (1936–2023), Ethiopian agronomist

== Surname ==
- LoLa Monroe (born Fershgenet Melaku in 1986), American rapper, model and actress of Ethiopian descent
- Tsega Melaku (born 1968), Israeli author, journalist, and community activist
