= Ngarachamayong Culture Center =

Cultural center in Koror, Palau

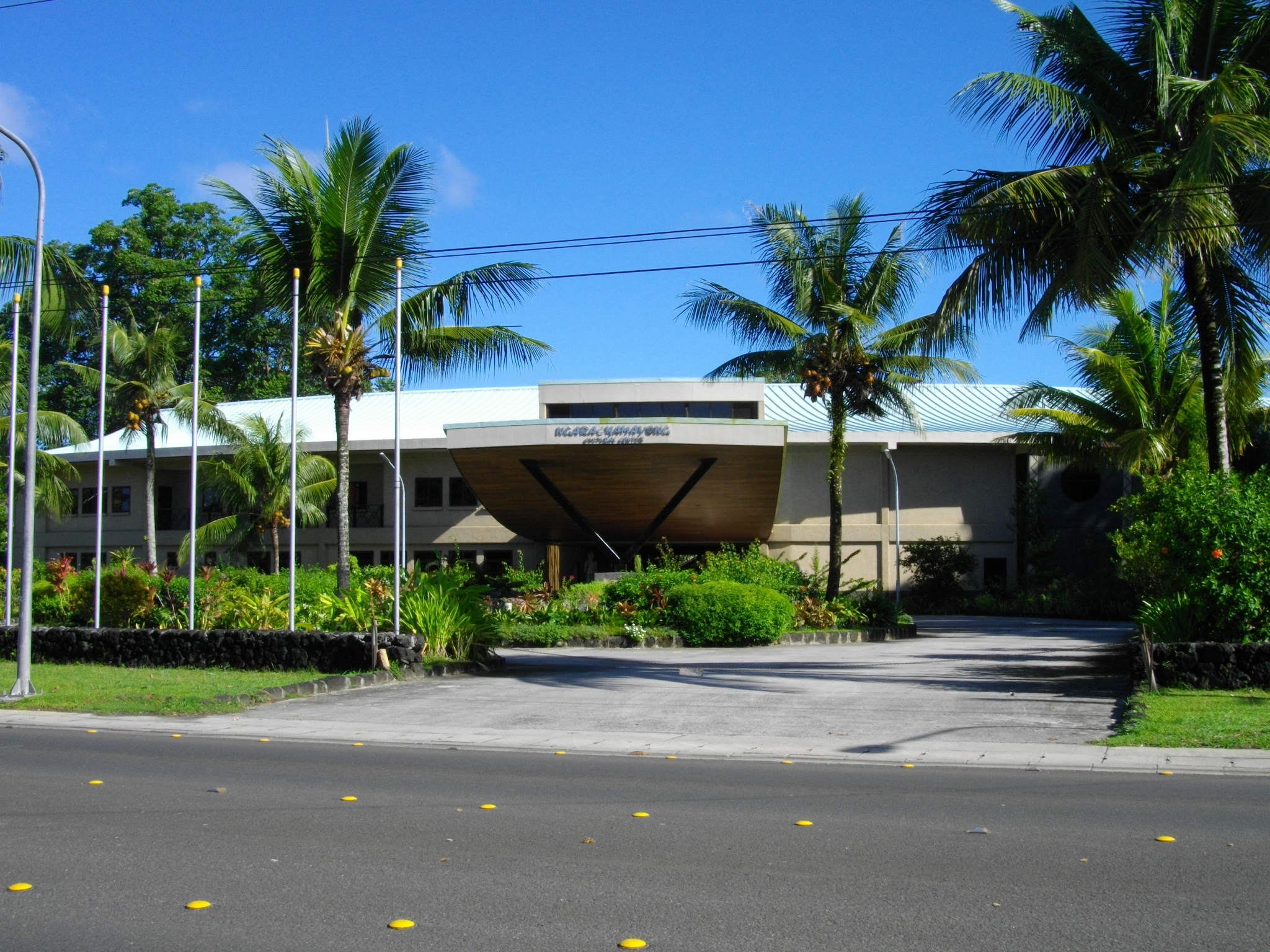
- Interactive map of Ngarachamayong Culture Center
- Location: Koror, Palau
- Coordinates: 7°20′36.0″N 134°28′05.5″E
- Type: cultural center

The Ngarachamayong Culture Center is a cultural center in Koror, Palau.

== History ==
The establish of this center started from a meeting by a group of people which then followed by the Mechesil Belau Conferences. During these conferences, the establishment of a cultural center was discussed, which then Ngarachamayong, Inc was incorporated. The cultural center was then constructed.

== Exhibitions ==
The cultural center exhibits the people and culture of the Palauan people. It also regularly hosts musical events.

== Finance ==
The center was funded by the Government of Palau and the Government of the Republic of China.
