= Debo Band =

Ethiopian jazz band

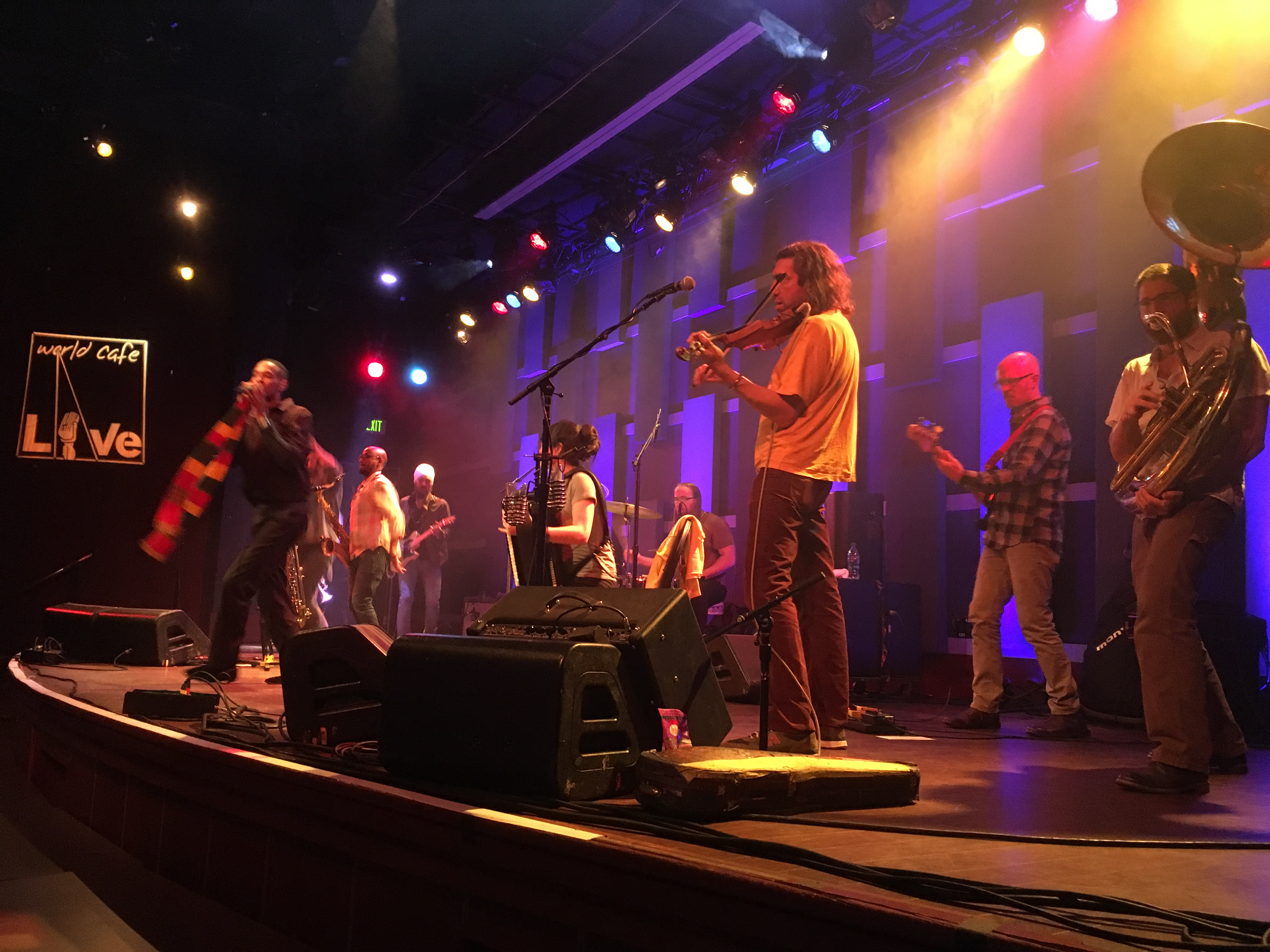
- Debo Band, playing Philadelphia in 2016

Background information
- Also known as: Debo
- Origin: Boston, Massachusetts, United States
- Genres: Ethiojazz; Ethiopian music
- Years active: 2006–present
- Labels: Sub Pop; FPE Records
- Website: www.debo.band

Debo Band (also known simply as Debo) are a Boston-based Ethiopian music band led by saxophonist Danny Mekonnen and fronted by vocalist Bruck Tesfaye. Ranging from 10–12 members playing horns, guitars, violins, percussion, and accordion, their sound incorporates Ethiojazz, folk, and pop styles from the Horn of Africa infused with tinges of motifs from Eastern Europe and Asia, as well as punk, experimental, and psychedelic rock. Rolling Stone described Debo's sound as, "guitar solos, massed vocals, violin and brass [that] rush in like a Red Bulled marching band...Dance at your own risk."

== History ==
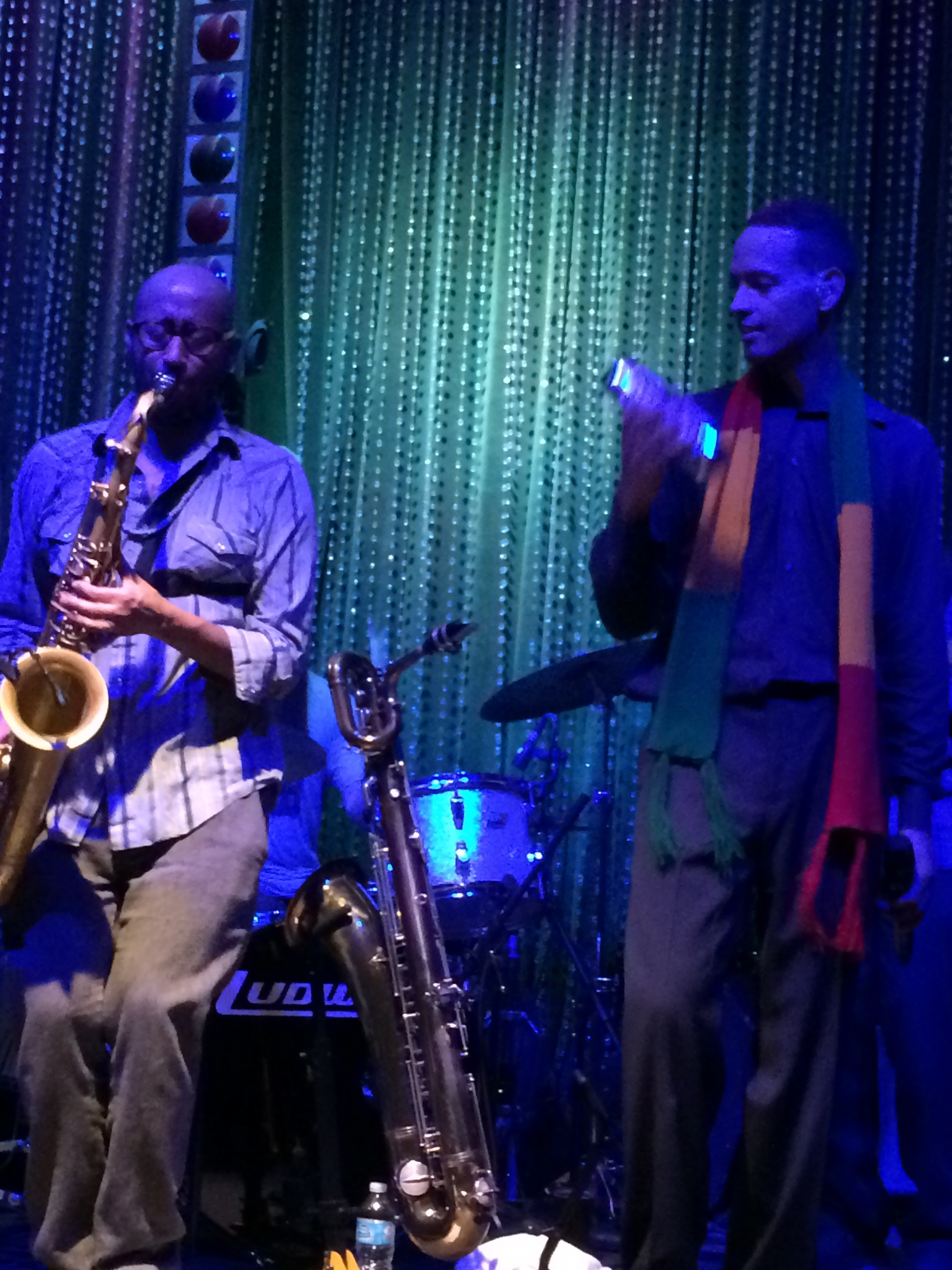
Saxophone player Danny Mekonnen and singer Bruck Tesfaye performing with Debo Band in 2014

Sudanese-born saxophone player Danny Mekonnen had grown up in Texas listening to his parents' home taped Ethiopian pop cassettes. In middle school he became obsessed with American jazz of the 1950s and 1960s, poring over records by John Coltrane and Miles Davis and went on to study and play jazz at the University of Texas. In the early 2000s he moved to Boston to attend Harvard University and being gigging in Boston's diverse music scene. In wanting to musically connect to his Ethiopian-American heritage, Mekonnen assembled a trio with vocalist Bruck Tesfaye to learn a few Ethiopian pop songs. They sought to expand the group and recruited members of Boston's recently defunct Stick and Rag Village Orchestra, a group of self-taught musicians who'd played old-time circus tunes, as well as klezmer and Balkan brass standards as part of the burgeoning radical street band movement. They worked out several tunes from the canon of Ethio-pop and jazz heard on the Éthiopiques compact disc series and recruited local members of the Ethiopian community to sing. "These were amazing people who had completely internalized the rhythms and melodies that we were struggling to learn," Mekonnen told The Boston Phoenix. "You couldn't say, 'Come in after four bars.' They didn't know what a bar was. It was an adventure for everyone." After many performances for the Ethiopian community, Bruck Tesfaye stayed on as the band's permanent singer, and the group took on the name "Debo" meaning "communal labor."

For their first few years Debo Band remained in Boston's underground music scene, sharing bills with hip hop and experimental music acts in basements, small clubs, and at loft parties around the city. While Debo began as a primarily acoustic outfit—saxophones, brass, violins, accordion, and *drums —they eventually added electric bass and guitar to create a fuller sound that brought them to play bigger venues. With the help of Éthiopiques curator Frances Falceto, the group traveled to Ethiopia, Tanzania, and Zanzibar in 2009 and 2010 for performances at large world music festivals, often to crowds who had never before heard Ethiopian music.

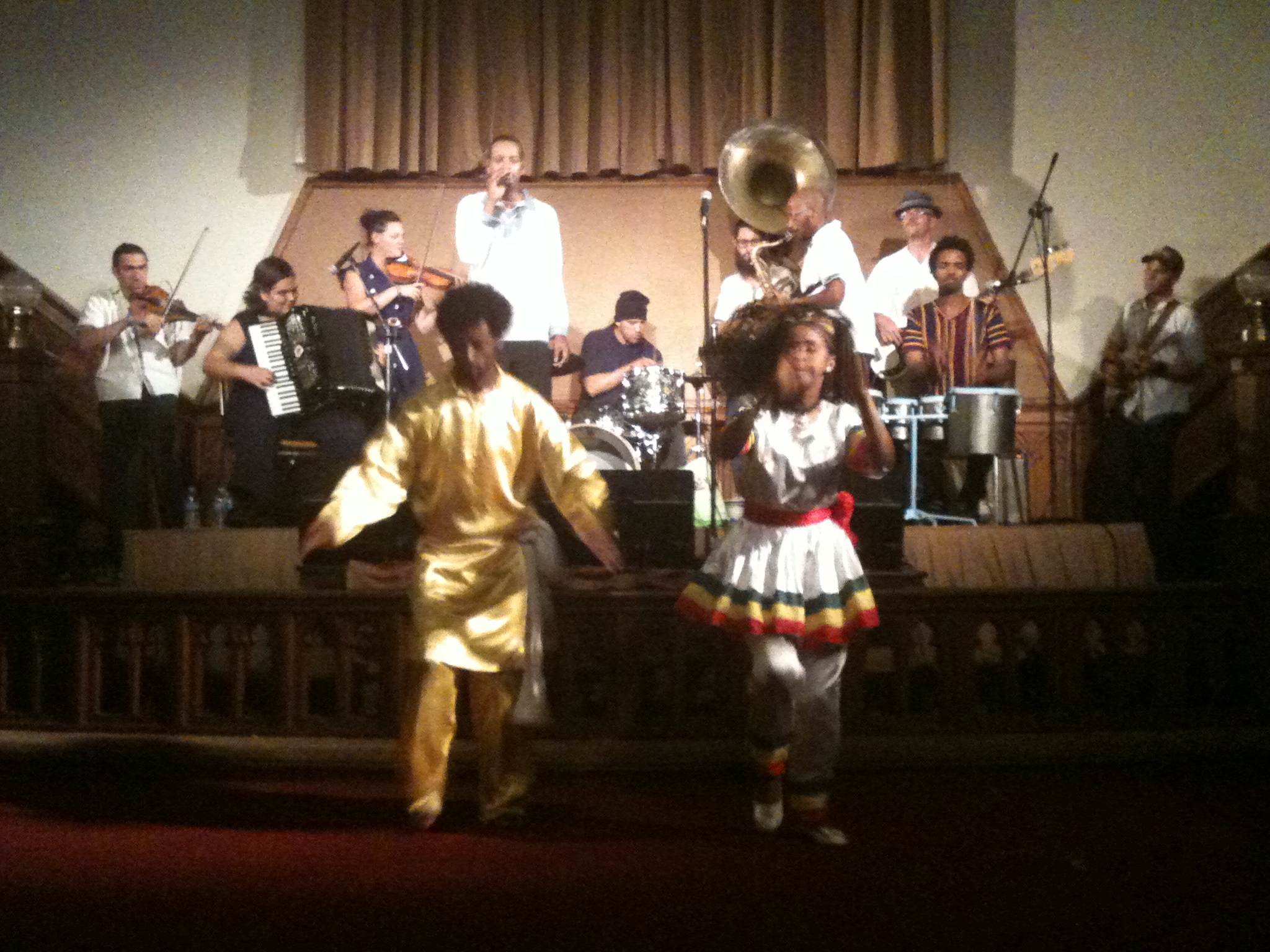
Debo Band performing with Fendika in 2010

In 2010 Debo self-released their first EP, a 4-song collaboration with the group Fendika from Addis Ababa with whom they toured the U.S. and Eastern Africa. The CD featured covers of well-known Ethiopian jazz and pop tunes by Walias Band, Mahmoud Ahmed, and others, half of which were recorded in Africa, the others in the United States. Following a pair of singles with B-sides remixed by DJ Kiddid, Debo Band's self-titled first full-length album was released by Sub Pop Records in 2012. Produced by Thomas Gobena of the group Gogol Bordello, the record draws heavily from Ethiopia in the early 1970s, with original songs, reworkings of Ethiopian folk melodies, covers of hits by Alèmayèhu Eshèté, Mahmoud Ahmed, Muluqen Mellesse, and Bezunesh Bekele, plus instrumentals by Getatchew Mekuria rearranged to have the sax man's scales played by a duet of violins. National Public Radio named the record one of their 50 Favorite Albums of 2012.

For the band's tenth anniversary, Debo released their second album Ere Gobez on Chicago-area label FPE Records. Named for a fervent battle cry known as "the call of the lionhearted", 'the record offered a faster, harder-hitting sound than their first album, with many nods to various band members' backgrounds in ethnomusicology. One song, "Blue Awaze," mashes up part of Duke Ellington's Far East Suite with the sound of Addis Ababa's legendary Police Orchestra. Another song, "Rafaad iyo Raaxo," pats tribute to Somalia's Dur Dur Band of the 1980s. The track “Hiyamikachi Bushi" bridges Ethiopian and Okinawan music as arranged by the band's accordionist Marië Abe, and in 2016 Debo became the first non-Japanese group to enter the song in Okinawa's annual International Competition of Hiyami Kachi Bushi. Pitchfork called Ere Gobez, "a big, brave roar, song after song...a powerful, and, perhaps, inspirational record."

== Related projects ==
While in Ethiopia, Debo Band scored the 2009 film Lezare ("For Today"), sound engineered by Debo's bass guitarist, PJ Goodwin.

In 2018 Debo backed Ethiopian vocalist Ayaléw Mèsfin for concerts in the U.S.

Debo violinist Kaethe Hostetter lives in Addis Ababa where she runs the Ethiopian String Center and plays in the bands QWANQWA and Zena Bel, the latter with members of Fendika.

As of 2021 Debo saxophonist Danny Mekonnen is working on a solo project called Dragonchild with a quadruple LP slated for release on FPE Records in 2021.

== Members ==
- Bruck Tesfaye: vocals
- Danny Mekonnen: saxophones
- Gabriel Birnbaum: tenor saxophone
- Danilo Henriquez: trumpet and percussion
- Stephanie Baird: trombone
- Jonah Rapino: electric violin
- Kaethe Hostetter: five-stringed violin
- Marié Abe: accordion
- Brendon Wood: guitar
- Arik Grier: sousaphone
- PJ Goodwin: bass guitar
- Adam Clark: drums

== Discography ==
Albums

- "Gedawo" 7" with DJ Kiddid (Electric Cowbell Records, 2011)
- Debo Band CD/2xLP (Sub Pop/Next Ambiance 2012)
- Ere Gobez CD/2xLP (FPE Records, 2016)

Singles and EPs

- Flamingoh: Pink Bird Dawn CD EP with Fendika (CRC Edition, 2010)
- "Adderech Arada" 7" with DJ Kiddid (Electric Cowbell Records, 2010)
