= Ketagalan Culture Center =

Culture center in Beitou, Taipei, Taiwan

- 凱達格蘭文化館
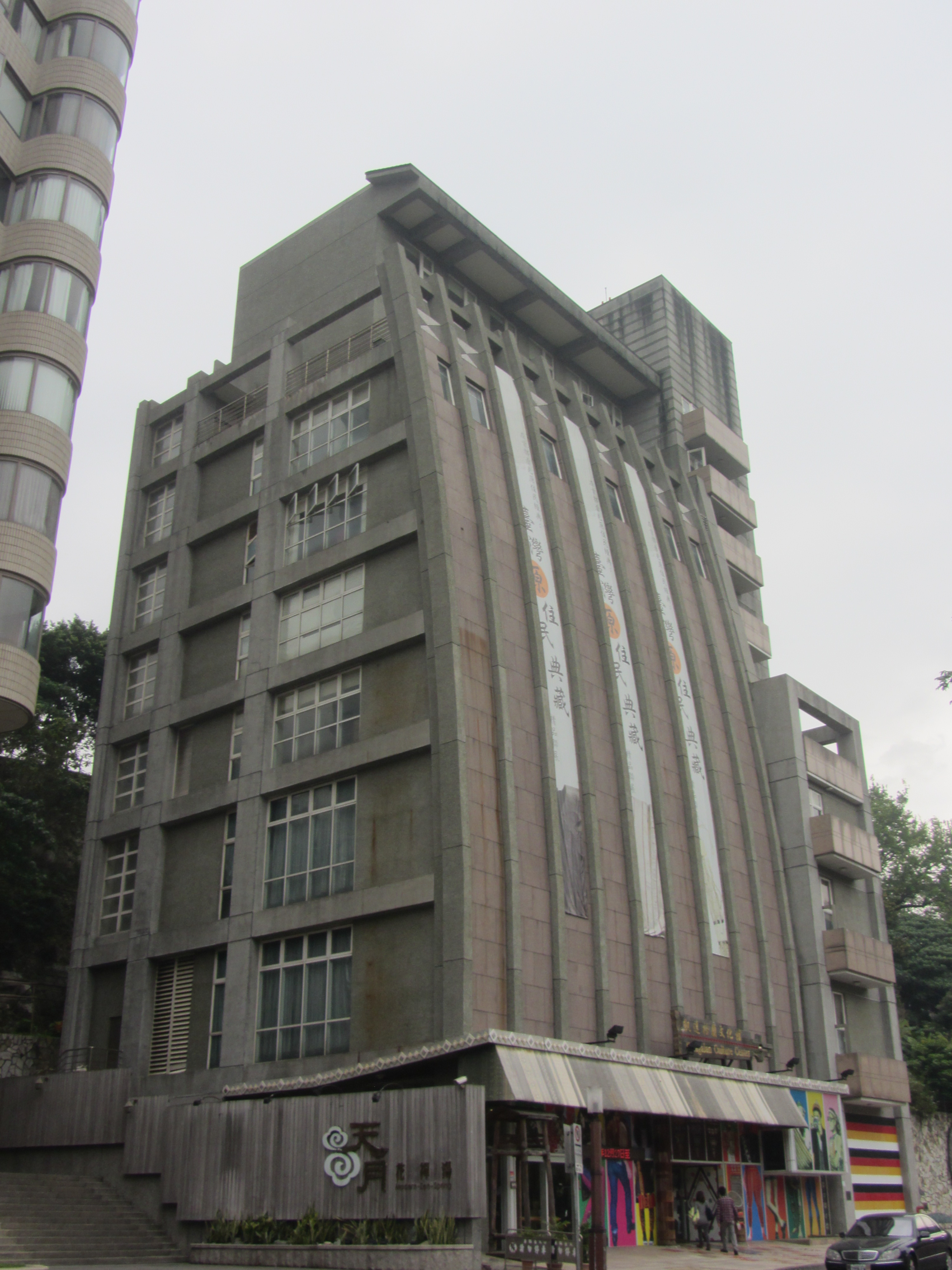
- Interactive map of Ketagalan Culture Center
- Location: Beitou, Taipei, Taiwan
- Coordinates: 25°08′14″N 121°30′19″E
- Type: cultural center

Construction
- Opened: 2002

Website
- Official website

The Ketagalan Culture Center (KCC; traditional Chinese: 凱達格蘭文化館; simplified Chinese: 凯达格兰文化馆; pinyin: Kǎidágélán Wénhuàguǎn) is a cultural center in Beitou District, Taipei, Taiwan. The cultural center is dedicated to introduce the various plains indigenous cultures, including the Ketagalan tribes cultures.

== History ==
The center was established in 2002. It underwent renovation in 2019.

== Architecture ==
The center is housed in a 10-story building. It consists of exhibition areas, art gallery, conference room and classrooms.

== Transportation ==
The cultural center is accessible within walking distance east from Xinbeitou Station of the Taipei Metro.

== See also ==
- List of museums in Taiwan
- Taiwanese indigenous peoples
