= Jaffna Cultural Centre =

Jaffna Cultural Centre Jaffna Thiruvalluvar Cultural Centre
- யாழ்ப்பாணக் கலாசார மத்திய நிலையம்
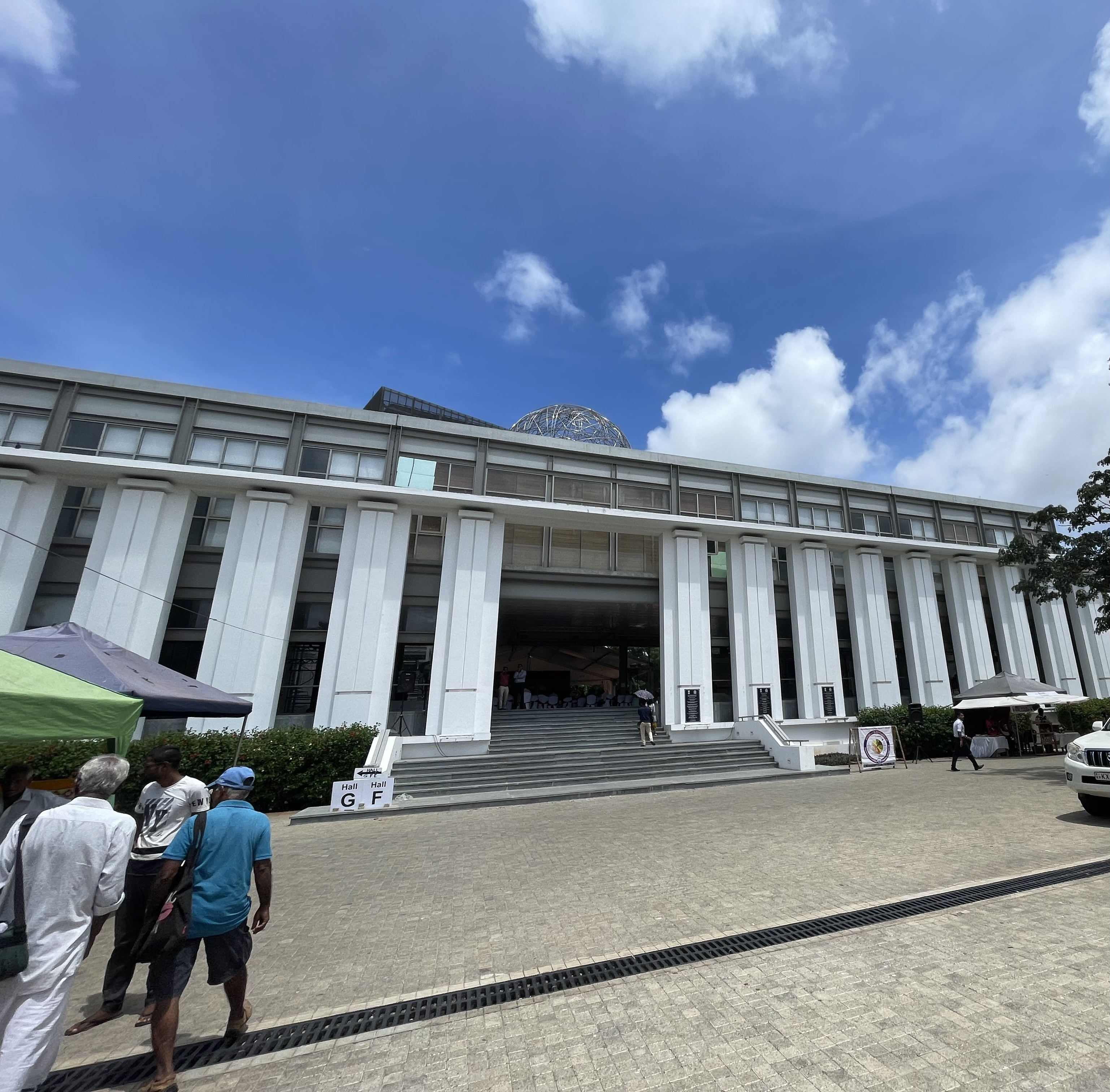
- Jaffna Cultural Centre in 2023
- Alternative names: யாழ் பண்பாட்டுப்படுவம்

General information
- Status: Completed
- Type: Mixed use: Entertainment; Observation; Education; Events; Tourist attraction
- Location: Jaffna, Sri Lanka
- Address: Esplanade Rd, Jaffna, Sri Lanka
- Completed: 2020
- Opened: 11 February 2023

Technical details
- Floor count: 11

The Jaffna Cultural Centre (in Tamil : யாழ்ப்பாணக் கலாசார மத்திய நிலையம் or யாழ்ப்பாணக் திருவள்ளுவர் கலாசார மையம் ; in Sinhala : යාපනය සංස්කෘතිය මධ්යස්ථානය or යාපනය තිරුවල්ලුවර් සංස්කෘතිය මධ්යස්ථානය), officially named as Jaffna Thiruvalluvar Cultural Centre, is a cultural centre in Jaffna, Sri Lanka. It was opened on 11 February 2023 by President Ranil Wickremesinghe and other Indian and Sri Lankan dignitaries. The centre includes an auditorium, conference hall, amphitheatre and a digital library.

== Background ==
Indian Prime Minister Narendra Modi laid the foundation stone for the cultural centre in 2015. The centre would be built at a cost of 11 million USD, with external fundings from India.

The centre was completed in early 2020 but would not be officially inaugurated until three years later, due to uncertainty surrounding its leadership and funding.

In 2022, the centre was inaugurated virtually by then Prime Minister of Sri Lanka Mahinda Rajapaksa and Foreign Minister of India Dr. S. Jaishankar, who was on a three day visit to Sri Lanka. After its inauguration, the centre remained closed for nearly a year due to the economic and political instability in the country at the time. It was officially reopened by President Ranil Wickremesinghe and Indian Union Minister Dr. L. Murugan on 11 February 2023.

During the inaugural ceremony in 2023, Wickremesinghe nicknamed or referred to it as the Saraswathi Mahal, a potential name for the centre, and a reference to a hypothetical royal library of the Jaffna kingdom, theorized by some Jaffnese historians. On 18 January 2025, the Indian government announced on the occasion of Pongal celebrations the renaming of the cultural center after the Tamil author and thinker Thiruvalluvar. Following requests from local Sri Lankan political parties, the designation of the center also includes the mention of "Jaffna".

== See also ==
India–Sri Lanka relations
