= Lezare =

Lezare (For Today)
- Directed by: Zelalem Woldemariam
- Screenplay by: Zelalem Woldemariam
- Produced by: Zeleman Production
- Starring: Binyam Teshome Fantu Mandoyr Mesfin Alemu Yemeserach Gembero Almaze Bekele
- Cinematography: Tobias Wettstein
- Edited by: Mark Morgan
- Music by: Debo Band
- Release date: 2009
- Running time: 14'
- Country: Ethiopia

Lezare (For Today) is a 2009 Ethiopian short film by director Zelalem Woldemariam. It won the prize for the best short film at the 2010 Amakula International Film Festival and the young jury award for best short film at the 2010 African Film Festival of Cordoba.

== Synopsis ==
A small homeless boy, Abush, wakes up hungry early in the morning in a small village. Right in front of where he is sleeping, there is a bakery. Abush can smell the bread, but he does not have any money. He starts to beg to buy bread but no one pays him any attention. The villagers are busy preparing for the tree-planting event that afternoon. Finally, an elderly man gives Abush some money, but asks him to help with the tree-planting first. But the day is long and getting food is hard.
