= La Casita Cultural Center =

Cultural organization in Syracuse, NY

- Founded: 2011
- Founders: Inmaculada Lara-Bonilla, Silvio Torres-Saillant
- Type: Latino cultural and research center
- Location: Lincoln Building, 109 Otisco St, Syracuse, NY 13204
- Coordinates: 43.04610678°N 76.15917533°W
- Region served: Syracuse, Central New York
- Key people: Tere Paniagua (Executive Director)
- Website: lacasita.syr.edu

La Casita Cultural Center

La Casita Cultural Center is a cultural center affiliated with Syracuse University. Located in the Near Westside neighborhood of Syracuse, New York, the center focuses on programs and research that highlight the experiences of Latino communities in Central New York.

== History ==
The concept of La Casita was influenced by José "Chema" Soto's La Casita de Chema, a cultural hub for Puerto Rican and Latino communities in Spanish Harlem and the South Bronx.

Established in 2011 (Note: In June of 2026, University of Northern Colorado renamed their Latino cultural center from the César Chávez Cultural Center to La Casita Cultural Center.), La Casita's facilities underwent extensive renovations with support from Syracuse University and funding from the Round 2 Restore New York Communities Initiative. The renovations were guided by architect Jon Lott of Syracuse University, whose interior design drew inspiration from the Rincón Criollo Cultural Center in the Bronx.

Latino cultural centers at American universities emerged as formal institutions beginning in the 1970s, starting with La Casa/Centro Cultural Latino at Indiana University Bloomington (1973). This trend expanded to universities including University of Illinois (La Casa Cultural Latina, 1974), the University of Illinois Chicago (Centro Cultural Latino Rafael Cintrón Ortiz, 1976), Yale University (La Casa Cultural de Julia de Burgos, 1977), and MIT (Latino Cultural Center).

== Programs and Research ==
=== Facilities and Community Programming ===
La Casita Cultural Center features a variety of facilities designed to support its mission of cultural engagement and education. The center includes an art gallery, a bilingual library, performance and workshop spaces, and areas for community gatherings.

Additionally, La Casita offers workshops and programs for children, such as art classes and storytelling sessions, emphasizing bilingual and multicultural learning.

=== Research Collaborations ===
La Casita was selected as one of ten institutions nationally to participate in "Latinos and Baseball: In the Barrios and the Big Leagues," a research initiative by the Smithsonian Institution's National Museum of American History. The project documented the role of baseball as a social and cultural phenomenon within American Latino communities between 2020 and 2021.

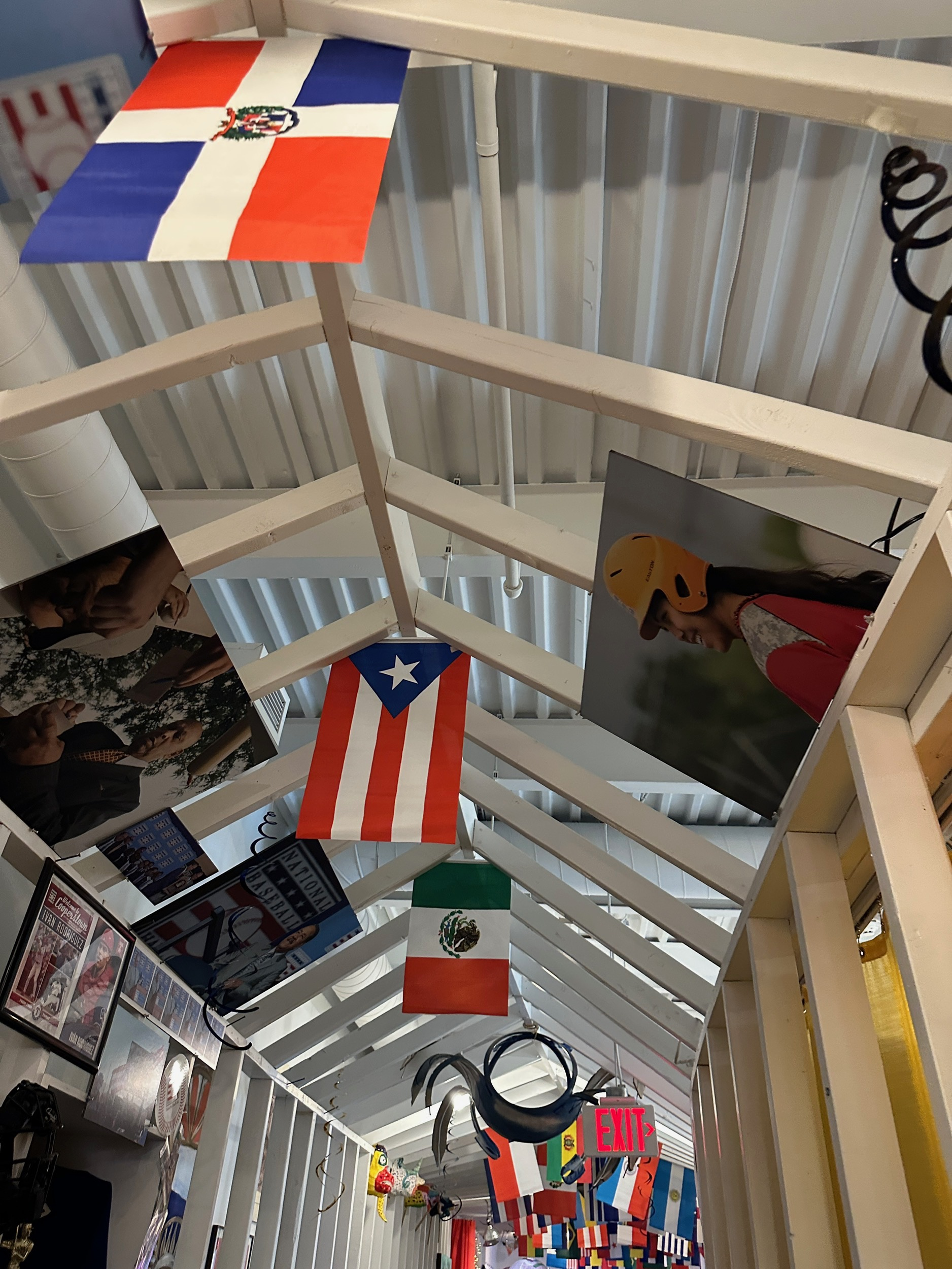
Image of a hallway in La Casita Cultural Center

== Digital Collections ==
La Casita maintains a digital archive hosted by the New York Heritage Digital Collections Archive, featuring oral histories, art, and community stories. A goal of this archive is to preserve the cultural memory of Latino communities in New York state.

Notable collections include:

- Balcón Criollo: An exhibit documenting Latino and Hispanic history and culture in Central New York.
- Latinos in Baseball: A project exploring the influence of baseball within Latino communities.
- Oral History Project: Recorded narratives from local Latino residents, highlighting individual and collective experiences.

== Events ==
La Casita Cultural Center hosts events that celebrate Latino culture and heritage. These include annual celebrations of Latino Heritage Month, art exhibitions, and cultural festivals.

On September 15, 2023, La Casita hosted "Futurismo Latino – Cultural Memory and Imagined Worlds", an art showcase featuring works from Chicano artists Cayetano Valenzuela and Zeke Peña.

In September 2025, La Casita opened "Corpórea", an exhibition focused on themes of healing, identity, and embodiment within the Spanish-Caribbean community. The exhibition was created through a series of "Arts as Mindfulness" workshops facilitated by Bennie Guzmán, and was supported by an $85,000 Creatives Rebuild New York grant. It was curated by Paola Nicole Méndez Soto and was on view through April 18, 2026. The exhibit featured Caribbean food, art, performances, and music acts, including Latin Grammy award winner Pedro Giraudo's tango quartet.
