= Fendika =

Ethiopian musical group

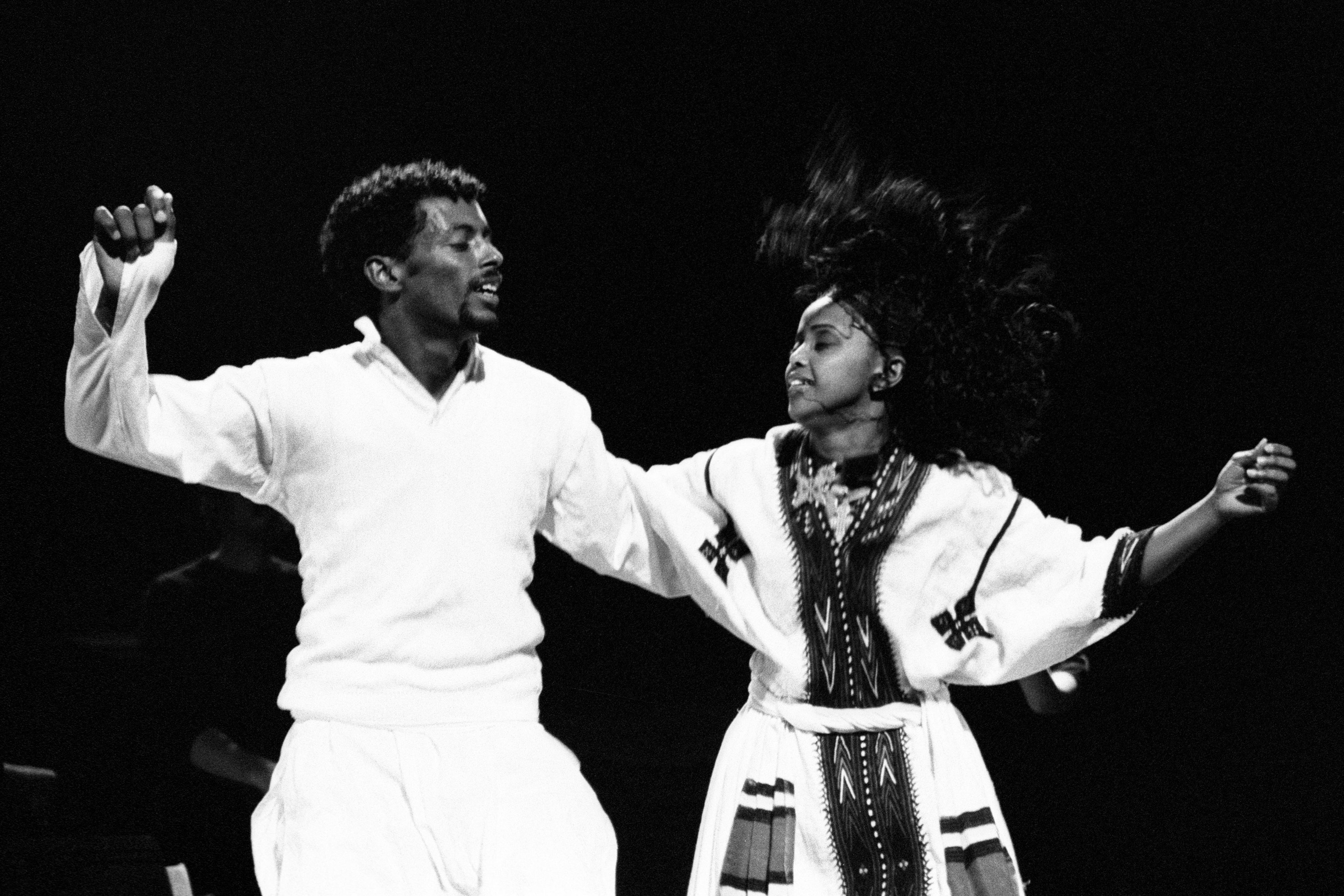
- Fendika members Melaku Belay and Zenash Tsegaye in 2009

Background information
- Also known as: Fendika Azmari Bet
- Origin: Addis Ababa, Ethiopia
- Genres: Ethiopian music
- Years active: 2009–present
- Labels: Terp Records

Fendika (Amharic: "Exult!") is an Ethiopian music group based in Addis Ababa. Led by dancer/choreographer Melaku Belay, they operate a venue, tour, record, and perform under the name Fendika.

== History ==
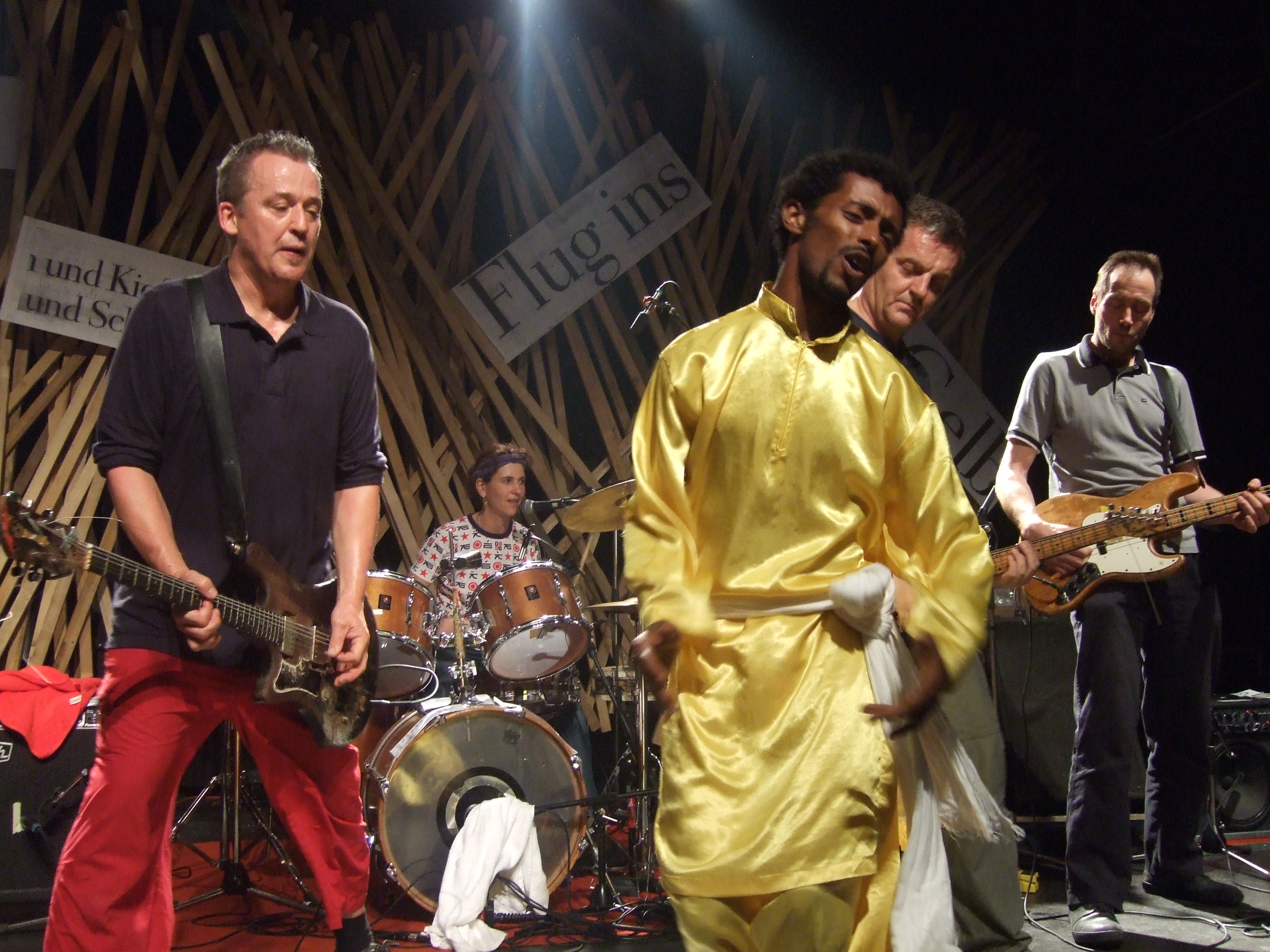
Melaku Belay onstage with The Ex in 2008

Born in 1980 in Ethiopia, Melaku Belay lived as an orphan on the streets of Addis Ababa. As a child Belay earned a living shining shoes and taught himself to dance through participation in folk traditions and religious festivals. He worked for seven years as a dancer for tips in Addis Ababa's Kazanchis neighborhood at a local azmari bet—a tavern that hosts azmari story-songsters who accompany themselves on the masenko (a one-stringed violin) or krar (a type of lyre). Each night after work, the young Melaku slept under the bar and eventually saved enough money to buy the club, Fendika Azmari Bet, from its owners.

When not working at the azmari bet, Melaku traveled extensively through Ethiopia, Eritrea, Somalia, and South Sudan to learn as many dances as he could from more than 80 tribes around the Horn of Africa, including the traditions of Gurage, Wolaita, Tigray, Wollo, Konso, Gonder, and Gojam, as well as dances from Somali and Afar regions. Melaku also became a nationally celebrated artist in eskesta, a shoulder dance style whose movements share roots with hip hop's traditions of locking and popping.

With Ethiopia's capital city being a nexus of culture, music, and dance from other nations, Melaku incorporated these into his repertoire as well, gradually assembling a 13-piece ensemble called the Ethiocolor Cultural Band. Combining tribal dances and folk instruments with jazz, rock, theater and elaborate costumes. The group became a staple at Fendika, rooted in the azmari tradition but with amplified versions of its instruments. In 2009 Melaku assembled a smaller group out of the larger Ethiocolor ensemble, featuring three musicians, two dancers, and one singer. With a more portable acoustic sound and azmari folk aesthetic, the group named themselves Fendika in tribute to the establishment from which they originated.

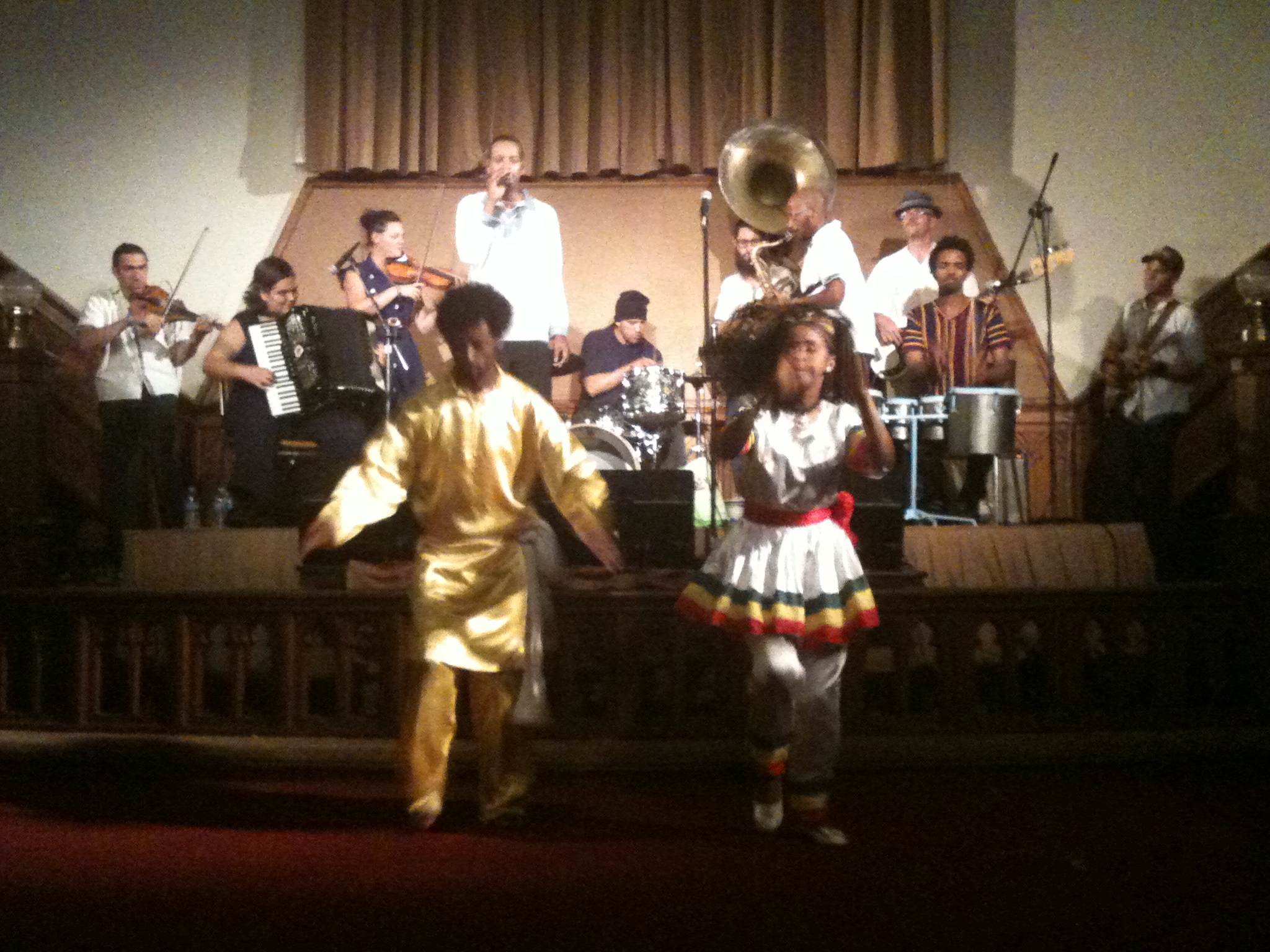
Fendika performing with Debo Band in 2010

Through the Fendika venue's hosting touring artists from all over the world, the ensemble has established an international network enabling them to travel and collaborate with musicians from around the globe. They have toured the United States and eastern Africa with Boston-area Ethio-jazz orchestra Debo Band, and in 2010 the two groups released a joint live recording from a concert given at the Sauti za Busara African music festival in Zanzibar. Fendika has also toured throughout Europe with Dutch post-punk band The Ex and released records through the band's label. In 2018 Fendika toured Scandinavia in collaboration with Paal Nilssen-Love's free jazz orchestra Large Unit before embarking on their first U.S. solo tour, performing as headliners to Ethiopia Fest Chicago and Boston's Global Music Fest.

In their home city of Addis Ababa, Fendika have collaborated with many of their nation's most well-known musicians, including singer Mahmoud Ahmed, begena player Alemu Aga, and saxophonist Getatchew Mekuria.

== Educational work ==
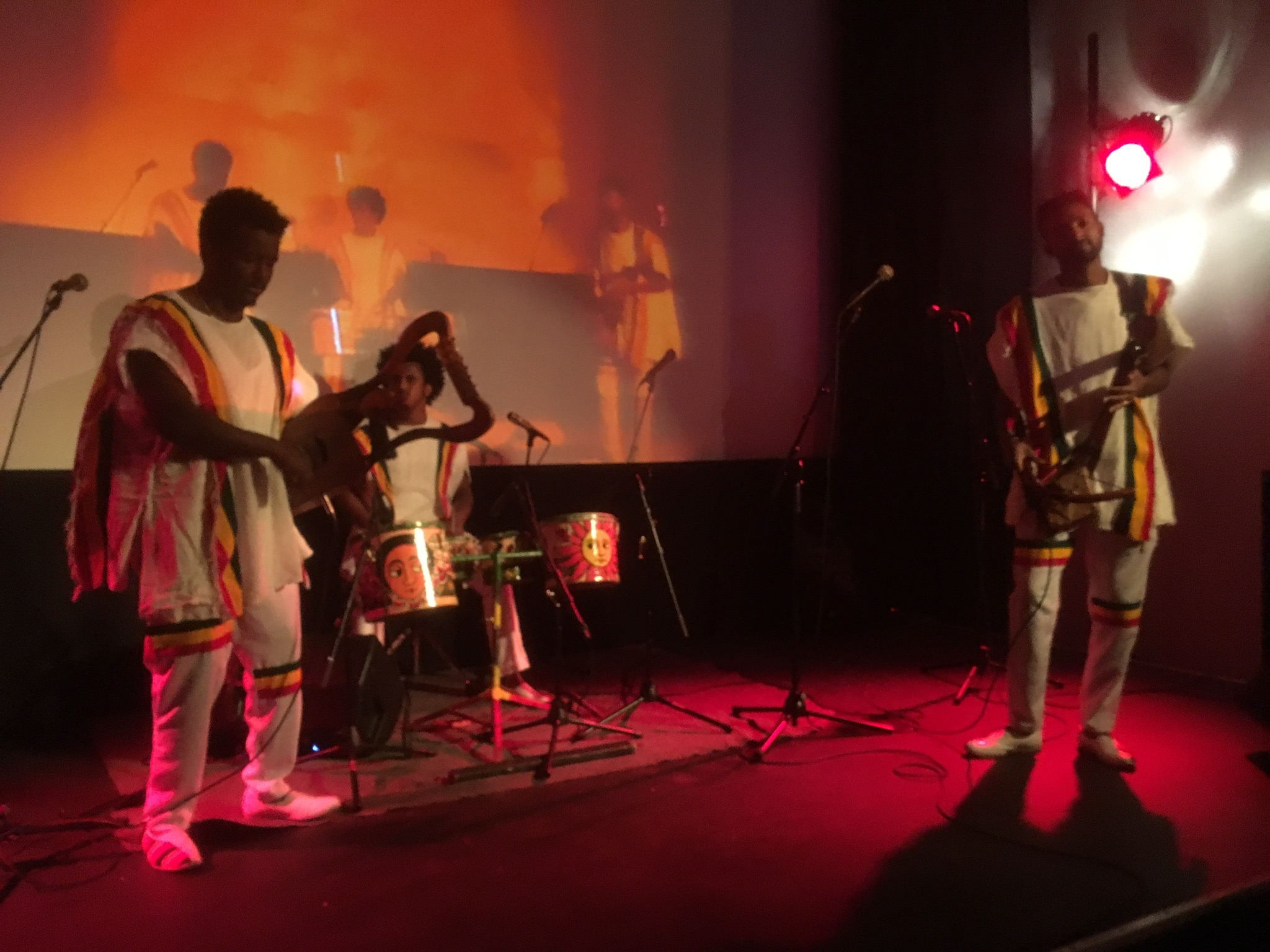
Fendika musicians at PhilaMOCA in 2018.

Fendika often leads workshops in traditional Ethiopian music and dance. The group also supports a school for migrant children which aims to prevent youth homelessness and child labor by providing cultural education for these children and their families. At the azmari bet, Belay supports a dozen young azmaris with room and board plus stipends to support their work. Fendika has also collaborated with members of The Ex, Instant Composers Pool, and others to bring electronic, punk, and improvised music education to Ethiopia.

== Awards and tributes ==
In 2011 Melaku Belay won the Alliance Ethio-Francaise award for dance excellence and in 2015 was named Chevalier dans l’Ordre des Arts et des Lettres by the French Ministry of Culture.

In 2011 Los Angeles rock group the Red Hot Chili Peppers released the song "Ethiopia" for their album I'm with You based on band members' time spent at Fendika. While visiting Ethiopia with guitarist Josh Klinghoffer, Peppers' bass player Flea had called up Melaku and asked to play at the venue. Inspired by their experience at Fendika, the musicians returned home and penned the song.

== Members ==
Fendika and Ethicolor perform, tour, and record in different configurations with ensembles that vary from 5 to 20 members at any given time.

Dance

- Melaku Belay
- Zinash Tsegaye
- Frehiwot
- Dagim

Vocals

- Nardos Tesfaw
- Selamnesh Zemene
- Belaynesh Bezabeh
- Tesfaye Taye
- Gashaw Abateneh
- Hawa

Krar

- Fassika Hailu
- Anteneh Teklemariam (bass krar)

Masenko

- Gizachew Teklemariam
- Endres Hassen
- Asrat Bosena
- Hargos Takele

Kebero

- Mesay Abebaye
- Misale Legesse
- Asrat Ayalew

Flute

- Yohannes Aferworq

Songwriting

- Tamru Neguse

== Discography ==
Albums

- Addis Tradition CD (2013)
- Ethiocolor CD (Selam Sounds, 2014)
- Melaku's Fendika CD (2016)
- Birabiro LP/CD (Terp Records, 2017)
- Ethiobraz CD/FLAC with Large Unit (PNL, 2019)

Singles and EPs

- Flamingoh: Pink Bird Dawn CD EP with Debo Band (2010)
- "Lale Guma"/"Addis Hum" 7" single with The Ex (Ex Records, 2015)
