= America Cultural Center =

America Cultural Centre
- Centro Cultural América
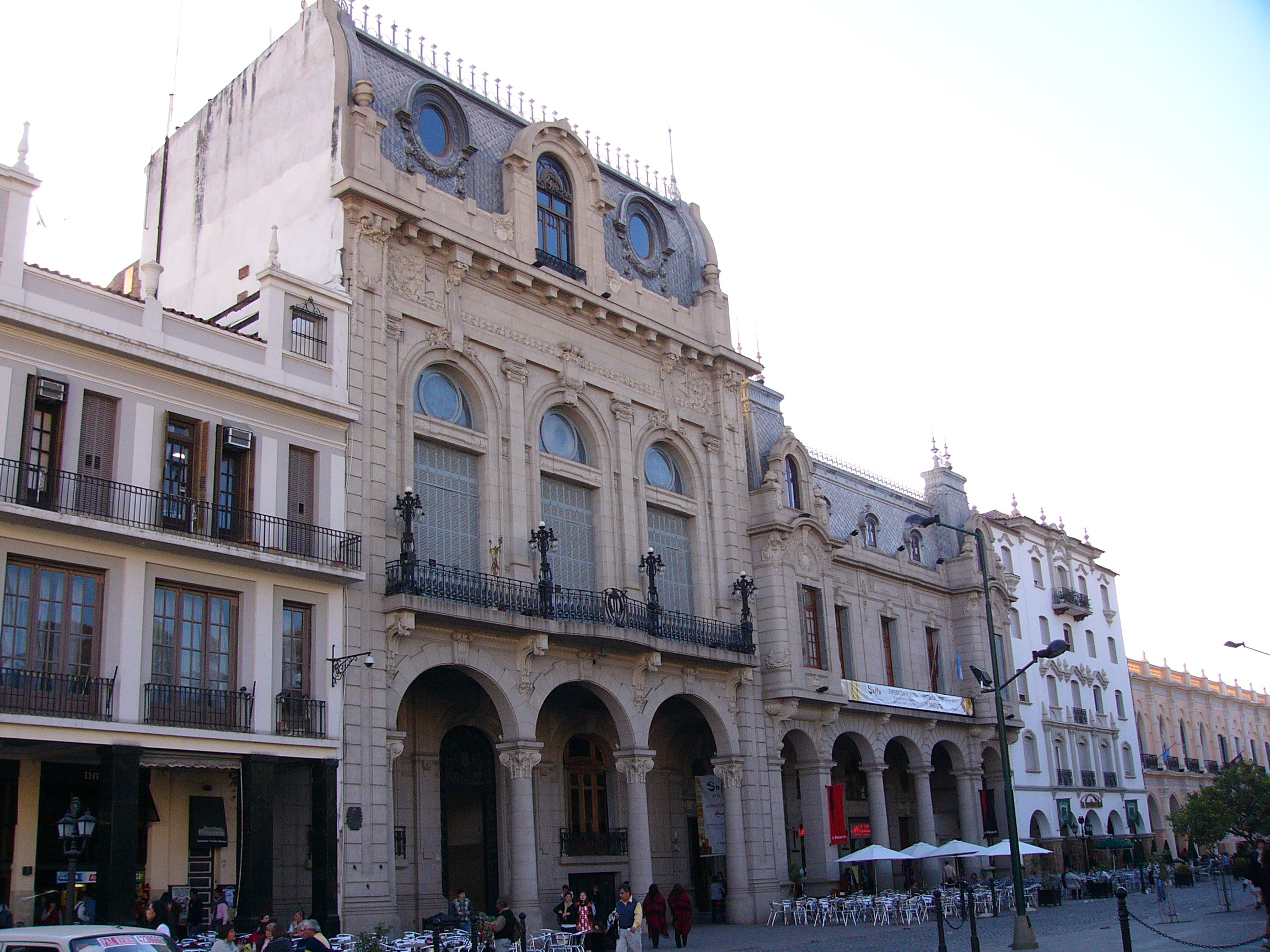
- Interactive map of the America Cultural Centre area

General information
- Location: Bartolomé Mitre 23, A4400 Salta, Salta, Argentina
- Coordinates: 24°47′22.32″S 65°24′39.76″W
- Owner: Secretaría de Cultura de Salta

Design and construction
- Architects: Arturo Prins, Correa and Cornejo
- Engineer: Arturo Prins, Correa and Cornejo

Website
- www.culturasalta.gov.ar/organismos/centro-cultural-america/45

America Cultural Centre (Spanish: Centro Cultural América) is a significant building in Salta, Argentina.

== History ==
In 1858, the Social Club 20 de Febrero was inaugurated. In 1908, they decided to build their own building. So, in 1910, the engineer and architect Arturo Prins created the project; the engineers and architects Correa and Cornejo continued with the construction. It was finally inaugurated in 1913. Access to this building was limited, and the partners of this association had to pay $1500 per share for its construction.

From 1950 until 1987, the building was expropriated for use as the Government House of the province. Since then, the building has been used for cultural activities under the name of America Cultural Center. Access to these areas was free and was limited.

Its restoration began in 1987 under the Department of Architectural Heritage and Preservation of Salta (DePAUS). It was financed by the community and the government of the province.

== Location ==
The building was built on a plot of land belonging to the Jesuit Church. It is a part of the Monumental Complex of Plaza 9 de Julio in Salta, Argentina.

== Architecture and design ==
It is decorated with ornamental details in walls and ceilings; the floor has venetian mosaics and oak parquet from Slovenia. Its infrastructure consists of hidden shapes of iron that were imported from England. This building has mezzanines of ceramic flooring blocks; it also has brick walls. The columns have plinths of marble from Botticino pilasters. The cornices, moldings and plaster sconces are made with vegetable fibers from the area (chaguar).

The basement originally served as fencing rooms, locker rooms, confectionery and hairdressing. There was a hall, a bar, a library, a billiard room and a lounge on the ground floor. On the first floor, there were a ballroom, meeting rooms and offices. It is currently used as a convention center.
