= El Centro Cultural de Mexico =

Non-profit organization

- Formation: 1994
- Location: 837 N Ross St. Santa Ana, California, 92701
- Region served: Orange County, California
- Website: El Centro Cultural de Mexico

El Centro Cultural de México is an all-volunteer alternative space in Santa Ana, Orange County, California, focusing on transnational projects that link residents to communities all over Mexico through the arts, culture, and social justice. Through educational programming, which includes workshops in dance, music, art, and literacy, it promotes understanding and appreciation of the contributions of the many active cultures in Orange County by sharing knowledge of Mexico's rich cultural, educational, and social legacy.

== History ==
The center was formed by a small group of migrant women in 1994. Since then El Centro Cultural de México has become an important part of the local Latino community, fostering solidarity and providing a link to important cultural customs.

Volunteer meeting at El Centro Cultural de Mexico

== Activities ==
The center holds a Día de los Muertos festival that attracts over 40,000 people each year. Classes at the center include music, dance, language, art, and self-defense.
