= Popular music in Ethiopia =

Popular music in Ethiopia started in 20th century with the advent of western influence and mostly blended with traditional Ethiopian music. The first band was formed in 1924, which came from Armenia and served as the royal band of Emperor Haile Selassie. After World War II, large orchestras accompanied singers such as Army Band, Police Band, and Imperial Bodyguard Band. From 1960s to 1970s, the Ethiopian Golden Age of music altered the popular music industry with numerous singers marked by their popularity such as Tilahun Gessesse, Mahmoud Ahmed and Alemayehu Eshete.

The music industry waned during the Derg era, where the persecution of musicians occurred and many were exiled from the country. A unique musical mode called "sem ena werq" ("wax and gold") revived; Neway Debebe used this style to criticize government action. After the fall of the Derg, the music industry was revitalized; many singers like Gigi, Munit Mesfin, and Meklit Hadero returned to their home country and were influenced by westernized modes. From the 2000s, popular music changed its form, implementing modern genres like EDM, rock and hip-hop.

== History ==
Ethiopian traditional music is embodied with a strong oral-literature style. In this case, the traditional music is played by local entertainers called azmaris. Music in Ethiopia originated as part of Christian religious services during the Yared-era in the 6th century. A Muslim form called manzuma also developed in Harar and Jimma.

Modern music was further developed with the advent of western influencse in the form of colonialism since 20th century. In 1924, the crown prince and future Emperor of Ethiopia Ras Tafari (Haile Selassie) called on the Armenian band upon his visit in Jerusalem. The band, who survived the Armenian genocide, was intended to form the imperial band. From the band, the conductor was an Armenian who composed the first national anthem of Ethiopia. By the end of World War II, large orchestras accompanied the singers, prominently the Army Band, Police Band, and Imperial Bodyguard Band. From the 1960s to the 1970s, popular music encapsulated the Ethiopian Golden Age of music, and the culmination of Ethio-jazz genre. Various musicians, including Tilahun Gessesse, Mahmoud Ahmed and Alemayehu Eshete were popular. In the late 1970s and 1980s, during the Derg regime, music was usually censored in support of Soviet Union political discourse. Most musicians fled the country to escape political persecutions while others stayed due to the closed borders. Those who stayed in the country shaped the weakened music industry and protest songs were a common motive against the Derg government.

By this time, the long poetic tradition named "sem ena werq" ("wax and gold") was revived which interpolates a tricky response to the Derg government censorship. From 1985, Neway Debebe used this style using traditional ballads. After the fall of the Derg, the music industry was revitalized and self-exiled musicians such as Gigi, Munit Mesfin, and Meklit Hadero returned to their home country and influenced the local music with westernized modes. Since 2000s, popular music resuscitated with mainstream scenes taking place in Addis Ababa. Many genres like EDM, rock and hip hop blended with traditional music. The Jano Band is credited with devising progressive rock with Ethiopian music. Hip hop music emerged in Ethiopia from early to mid-2000s to form distinct Ethiopian hip hop music. Some central pioneering hip-hop musicians are Teddy Yo and Lij Michael.

== See also ==
- Music and politics in Ethiopia
