= Music and politics in Ethiopia =

Aspect of Ethiopian history and culture

Music and politics have been closely intertwined throughout the history of Ethiopia.

== Pre-1930 government and music ==
Between 1917 and 1930, Ethiopia was focused on using a national army to centralize power. To do so, they called on European aid, which led to a wave of mass education and the establishment of European institutions across the country. At the same time, a lot of Ethiopians were sent to study abroad in countries such as France and Great Britain, resulting in significant European influence on modern musical development of Ethiopia. Performing music on stage, the use of the theater for dramatic music productions, and the establishment of dance, marching bands, and music conservatories were among the European ideas adopted by Ethiopian musicians.

Within the same period, music began to have an important role in Ethiopia's military. In 1923, Kevork Nalbandian, an Armenian, organized the first military marching band. Bands later became very popular across the country, and many of Ethiopia's earliest music groups such as orchestras, symphonies, and chamber groups were organized by military institutions.

== Music and nationalism ==
=== Emperor Haile Selassie ===
During the reign of Emperor Haile Selassie, music was nurtured through media broadcasting, government-sponsored theaters, and the Yared School of Music at Addis Ababa University. The Ethiopian Patriotic Association, which was established by the Ministry of Information and Propaganda, sought to promote Ethiopian culture by highlighting the contributions of Ethiopian leaders. They created the yebahil orchestra, which combined traditional ideas and cultures to produce Western-influenced music. The orchestra normalized indigenous instruments from central and northern Ethiopia playing together on the stage. The Orchestra Ethiopia, made up of musicians from varied ethnic backgrounds, performed songs from several cultural groups including the Amhara, Oromo, and the Welayta.

Music combining Western and local cultures continued to spread across Ethiopia. In 1960, a strong national movement originated in the fine arts community and began to spread across Ethiopia. Organizers felt that their national identity was being threatened by the growing influence of western traditions, which led to the establishment of organizations that focused solely on preserving Ethiopian heritage across the country. After the 1974 revolution, the new government organized local performing groups in neighborhoods and regions throughout the nation in order to promote their political agenda. The groups were known as the kinet, and their purpose was to cultivate nationalist sentiment by combining Ethiopian cultural music with the ideas of Marxism–Leninism. The kinet is said to have played a role in the development of Bahil-Zemenawi, a traditional modern genre that used previously abandoned local musical material and combined it with Western material.

=== Oromo nationalism and music 1974-present ===
The conflict between the Oromo people, Ethiopia's largest ethnic group, and the federal government has a complicated history.

Oromos have been able to maintain their sense of autonomy partly due to cultural practices. For a long time, Oromos had to remember and interpret their cultural history orally until they developed a writing system in the 1960s. Oromos have therefore traditionally relied on music, poetry, and dance to express their culture, preserve identity, and resist Amharic cultural hegemony. Oromo music often relates stories of how the northern ethnic group resembled white colonizers who forcibly established political systems and exploited the Oromo people. Government efforts to ban the Oromo language failed because Oromos did not rely on written records to preserve their heritage.

Threatened by the power of Oromo music, Emperor Haile Selassie persecuted, imprisoned, tortured, or even killed musicians on suspicion that they were sympathetic to Oromo nationalist sentiments. Oromo language oppression began during the government of the Derg following Selassie's death. Teachers were prohibited from teaching Oromo, and individuals who spoke it were ridiculed for not speaking the national Amharic language. Many Oromo professionals have fled the country, including musicians who have relocated to Norway.

The Biftu Oromia, a government-sponsored performance troupe that performed during the administration of Meles Zenawi, performed in traditional clothing and sang traditional songs, but this was the only group at the time allowed to perform such activities. Oromos viewed these acts as government propaganda for the Oromo People's Democratic Organization, which was largely seen as a puppet during Zenawi's regime.

When the ruling Ethiopian People's Revolutionary Democratic Front first came to power in 1988, one of their primary goals was to unify the country's various ethnicities as they worked towards a more democratic government. The new constitution divided the country along ethnic lines. The government gave the right for ethnic groups to secede, but they also implemented tactics to appeal to Ethiopia's diversity and promote peace, such as tapping into different cultures' traditional music. This is not the first time such an approach was taken by the government to promote national cultural unity. During the reign of Emperor Haile Selassie, Selassie used Amhara and Tigray cultures to oppress other ethnic groups and ban their languages. However, traditional music has also been a way for ethnic groups to maintain their cultural and political identities.

There is no law that explicitly censors Oromo expression, but there is a large preference for music written in the Amharic language in music shops. This is often considered to be an underhanded way of preventing Oromo music from reaching a wider audience. Most music shops are willing pay large amounts to artists who produces music in Amharic rather than in the Oromo language.

While a revival of Oromo arts, literature, and drama took place during the transitional period in 1991, Oromo artists continued to experience widespread repression. Oromo artists, athletes, and other professionals have been targeted because of their public image and perceived links to the Oromo Liberation Front (OLF). The Advocates for Human Rights have recorded stories where Oromos have shared their experience of persecution. One individual describes being caught, beaten, and threatened by soldiers when she joined ten other Oromo singers to record cassettes about Oromo freedom in 1996. Folk singer Elfinesh Kano was arrested on December 31, 1993, after protesting the trial of OLF leaders. It was reported that the prisoners were mistreated while being detained, and received a one-month jail sentence after trial. The court alleged that they were investigating Kano's music in order to determine if it contained anti-government sentiments, and as a result Kano was held past her sentence.

=== Notable Oromo musicians ===
==== Bashir Dabiy ====
Bashir Dabiy is a female Oromo singer who is currently living in asylum in Norway. Dabiy allegedly angered the Ethiopian government by performing a geerarsa, a type of music Oromos use to express nationalist sentiments. She was arrested, imprisoned, and allegedly beaten and shaved. Dabiy's choice to sing geerarsa also allegedly displeased her community, as it defied traditional gender traditions.

==== Haacaaluu Hundeessaa ====
In 2015, Oromo artist Haacaaluu Hundeessaa, known for his songs of political activism, released "Maalan Jiraa" ("What fate is mine?"). Hundeessaa was arrested at age 17 for political activism, and at the time of the song's release he had spent five years in prison, where he reportedly became increasingly politicized. "Malaan Jiraa" attempts to relate the struggles of the Oromo people, and once released it became a rallying anthem for their cause.

Hundeessaa followed by releasing “Jirra” ("We Are Here”) in 2017, and that same year, he performed at a concert in the capital to raise money for displaced Oromo families. Between 2015 and 2018, Ethiopia saw a rise in Oromo protests. The protests lead to the resignation of Prime Minister Hailemariam Desalegn, who was replaced by Abiy Ahmed. Even though Ahmed encouraged political and economic freedom, ethnic tensions persisted.

On the evening of June 29, 2020, Hundeessaa was shot and killed on the street in Addis Ababa. By early morning on June 30, thousands of demonstrators took to the streets across Oromia. Homes and businesses were vandalized in Addis Ababa, troops were deployed to restore order, and the internet was switched off nationwide for more than a week. Thousands of arrests were made and more than 160 people died. Both sides of the conflict have blamed each other for the death of Hundeessaa, but the truth of the circumstances surrounding his death remains unknown.

== National identity, gender roles and the diaspora ==
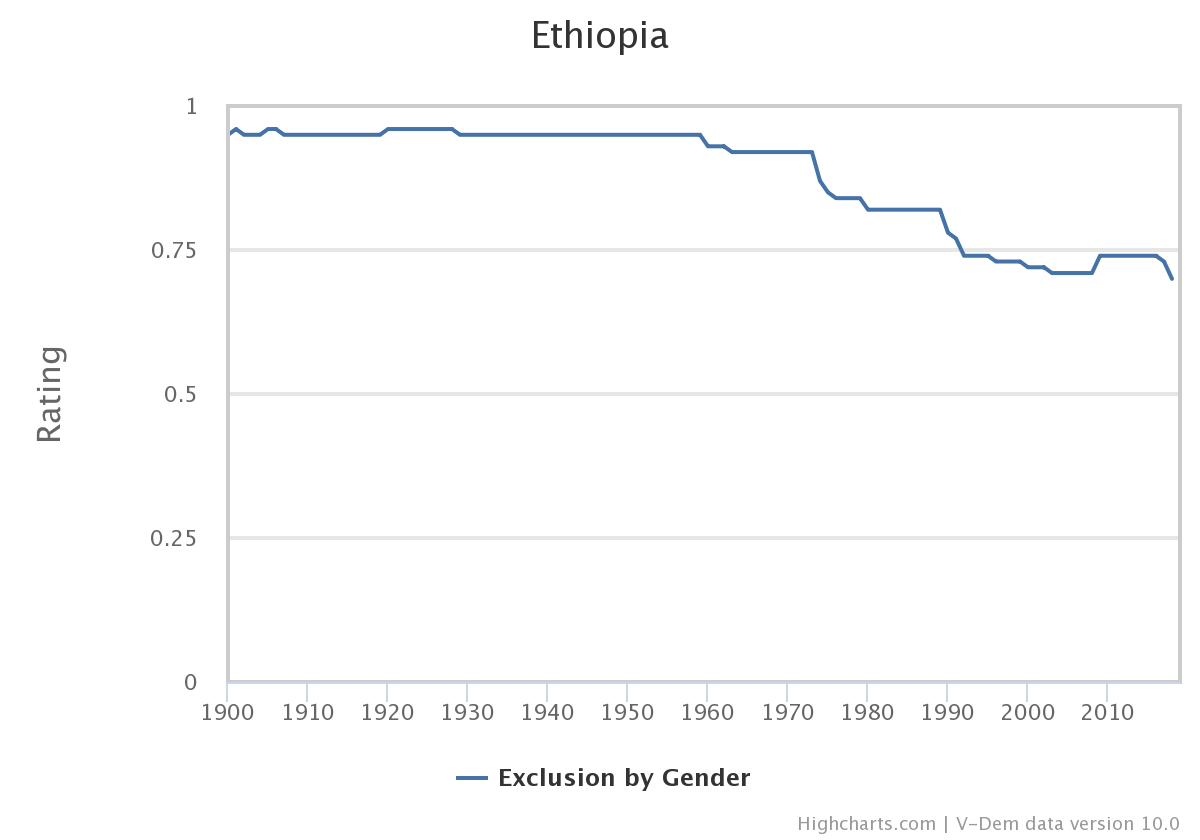
Graph created using V-Dems

One of the most widely recorded songs was "tizita, also called the "Song of Longing," a track which evokes nostalgia for a bygone time. The Amharic lyrical technique of "Wax and Gold" allows singers to create levels of meaning. On the Wax level, singers showcase their verbal dexterity to express love, and on the Gold level, singers expresses nostalgia for a lost time or place. Songs often focus on domestic relationships, family life and the contributions of these relationships to Ethiopian identity. Themes of homesickness are particularly evident among female performers, both within Ethiopia and abroad, who found a way to express their political voice through music, especially during the later days of Emperor Haile Selassie's reign.

=== Music under authoritarianism ===
When Emperor Haile Selassie was overthrown in 1974, Mengistu Haile Mariam and the Derg seized power, passing strict laws censoring speech and controlling capital nightlife. Azmari-betotch, music houses, were essentially closed, limited to providing entertainment for foreigners. During the period of the Derg (1974-1991), Ethiopian populations across Europe and North America rose, and many musicians fled Ethiopia to escape persecution, war, and famine.

When the Derg collapsed, many of these diasporas remained, although movement restrictions were lifted in Ethiopia, allowing people to move freely across the border. Music and Azmari-betotchs returned. Since the revival came at a time when cassettes were widely used, Ethiopian music thrived in the world market. Musical production from ethnic minorities, women, and Pentecostals increased, challenging the authority of both the church and Amhara cultural hegemony.

== Other notable Ethiopian artists ==
=== Asnaketch Worku ===
Azmari, rural improvisational folk musicians, make up a large part of Addis Ababa's music culture. Azmari sing and play the massenquo, a single-stringed upright fiddle. Traditionally, this role was passed down from father to son., but Asnaketch Worku, a trained female Azmari, released The Lady with the Krar in 2003. Werku redefined the genre and became a prominent Azmari artist. She performed Azmari pieces such as tizita and favored instruments that embodied femininity. For instance, she would use the euphonic krar, a six-stringed bowl-lyre that is historically significant to the Amhara, instead of the more widely used massenqo. In some performances, Werku used a pastoral background reminiscent of the ancestral lands of Amhara.

=== Aster Aweke ===
Unlike Werque, who lived her entire life in Ethiopia, Aster Aweke lived in the United States numerous times over the course of 30 years. Aster drew from Azmari tradition during the age of the Derg in Ethiopia, and her music combines western instruments with the minor pentatonic tones of Azmaric music to create recognizably Ethiopian music representing the diaspora. Aweke also recorded several versions of "Tezeta", Ethiopia's most popular song.

=== Wayna Wondwossen ===
Wayna Wondwossen was born in Ethiopia and grew up in the Washington, DC suburbs. Her music focuses on social problems, for example, "Billie Club" addresses American police brutality, a significant issue for African-Americans. Wondwossen's music videos contrast tender images of home with those of US violence, commenting on Ethiopian-Americans' desire to escape such bloodshed by emigrating."Home," sung in English, examines the Ethiopian diaspora and the possibility of Ethiopians returning to their homeland.

=== Cabray Casay ===
Cabra Casay was born 1985 in a Sudanese refugee camp while her parents were migrating to Israel during Operation Moses. Casay's native language is Tigrinya, but she also performs in Hebrew and Amharic. Casay's music explores her sense of having strong Ethiopian roots despite never having lived there herself. This awareness is common within the African and Jewish diasporas as individuals seek to connect with their ethnic communities.

Casay is the lead singer of The Idan Raichel Project, a multi-ethnic Israeli band. She and Raichel wrote 2006's "Habayta" (Home), which follows a migrant who travels home "in both directions", a common sentiment among Ethiopian-Israelis who constantly travel between one diaspora and the other.

== State-funded music groups today ==
State-funded cultural music groups still exist in Ethiopia. Hager Fikir and the National Theatre are two examples of state-run troupes that mainly perform for Ethiopian and foreign government officials. Both groups were tasked with performing music from a multitude of regions across Ethiopia. For example, the National Theatre employed forty-one cultural performers that included singers from Gamo-Gofa, Amhara, Tigray, Welayta, Gurage, Somali, Afar, and Oromia. However, it was not possible to incorporate musicians from each of the many ethnic groups in Ethiopia, and as a result, vocalists sing variations from their language branch. For example, a performer who knows the Omotic language may also sing in Welayta, Gamo, or any other Omotic language. Similarly, Hager Fikir Theatre recruits singers from peoples in different regions such as Gambella, Kunama, Tigray, Oromia, Amhara, Gurage, Welayta, Dorze, and Sidama, although they represent the larger ethnic groups.

== See also ==
- Music of Ethiopia
- Ethiopian Golden Age of music
- Culture of Ethiopia
- Politics of Ethiopia
