= Sketches of Ethiopia =

Studio album by Mulatu Astatke
- Released: 13 August 2013
- Genre: Jazz
- Length: 52:24
- Label: Jazz Village
- Producer: Mulatu Astatke

Mulatu Astatke chronology
Mulatu Steps Ahead (2010)	Sketches of Ethiopia (2013)

Sketches of Ethiopia is a studio album by Ethiopian musician, composer, and arranger Mulatu Astatke. It was released on 13 August 2013 through Jazz Village. It peaked at number 24 on the UK Jazz & Blues Albums Chart.

== Background ==
On Sketches of Ethiopia, Mulatu Astatke is backed by Steps Ahead Band, which is not related to the jazz fusion group Steps Ahead. As with his last album Mulatu Steps Ahead (2010), Ethiopian instruments such as the washint, the krar, and the masinko are also used in the album. The album's opening track is a rendition of "Azmari", which was written by Russ Gershon. The album's closing track is "Surma", a collaboration with the Malian singer Fatoumata Diawara, who co-wrote the song with Astatke. Sketches of Ethiopia is Astatke's first internationally distributed studio album.

== Critical reception ==
Professional ratings
Review scores
Source	Rating
Classical Music	4/5 stars
Financial Times	3/5 stars
The Guardian	4/5 stars
The Irish Times	3/5 stars
Jazzwise	4/5 stars
MusicOMH	3.5/5 stars

Richie Troughton of The Quietus stated, "The music itself mixes urban club tempos with traditional rural folk styles, with Mulatu's trademark Ethio-jazz fusion of Latin percussion and Afro-funk rhythms." He added, "While the Ethio-jazz movement may have inspired many young musicians in Ethiopia to pick up instruments, this album serves as a reminder that the original architect of the form is still the undisputed master." Howard Male of The Independent commented that "Each track here is a distinctive entity which contributes to a cohesive funky whole." Banning Eyre of NPR stated, "It's never predictable and, for all the surprises, it never feels cluttered or gimmicky."

== Track listing ==
Sketches of Ethiopia track listing
No.	Title	Writer(s)	Length
1.	"Azmari"	Russ Gershon	5:02
2.	"Gamo"	Mulatu Astatke; Gerssu	5:15
3.	"Hager Fiker"	traditional	6:08
4.	"Gambella"	Astatke; Kute Ogulo	6:12
5.	"Assosa Derache"	Astatke	10:03
6.	"Gumuz"	Tesfaye; traditional	6:30
7.	"Motherland Abay"	Astatke	8:34
8.	"Surma"	Astatke; Fatoumata Diawara	4:42
Total length:			52:24

== Personnel ==
Credits adapted from liner notes.

- Mulatu Astatke – vibraphone, piano, keyboards, arrangement, production

Steps Ahead Band

- James Arben – flute, oboe, tenor saxophone, clarinet
- Richard Olatunde Baker – percussion
- John Edwards – double bass, bass guitar
- Alexander Hawkins – piano, keyboards
- Danny Keane – keyboards, cello
- Tom Skinner – drums
- Byron Wallen – trumpet

Additional musicians

- Yohanes Afwork – washint
- Messale Asmamow – krar
- Indris Hassun – masinko
- Fatoumata Diawara – vocals (8)
- Tesfaye – vocals

Technical personnel

- Alexis Maryon – cover photography

== Charts ==
Chart performance for Sketches of Ethiopia
Chart (2013)	Peak position
UK Jazz & Blues Albums (OCC)	24
