= Rahel Yohannes =

Ethiopian musician and singer (1947–2026)

- ራሄል ዮሃንስ
- Born: 5 May 1947; Addis Ababa, Ethiopian Empire
- Died: 5 July 2026 (aged 79); Addis Ababa, Ethiopia
- Resting place: Debre Mehret Sellassie Mehret Cathedral, Addis Ababa
- Occupations: Singer; songwriter; instrumentalist
- Musical career
- Origin: Kazanchis, Addis Ababa
- Genres: Ethiopian music; tizita
- Instruments: Vocals; krar
- Years active: 1980s–2026
- Label: AIT Records

Rahel Yohannes (Amharic: ራሄል ዮሃንስ; 5 May 1947 – 5 July 2026) was an Ethiopian singer, instrumentalist and songwriter. She was best known for her tizita-based songs such as "Arada", "Tizita", "Menelik", "Liguazew", and "Hagere Ethiopia".

== Life and career ==
Rahel Yohannes was born in Kazanchis area in Addis Ababa on 5 May 1947. Initially pursuing the hospitality sector, Rahel earned diplomas from Ras and Ghion Hotels, which established her career in hotel management. During her stay in hospitality, Rahel hosted prominent African leaders, including Gamal Abdel Nasser, Sekou Toure, and Kwame Nkrumah. Later on, she was transitioned to international embassies and luxury hotels, leading her own boutique hotel establishment as General Manager.

She was then discovered by prominent vocalist Ketema Mekonnen, who helped her to produce 13 studio albums from 1980s such as Anchi Bale Deri alongside Shambel Belayneh. She later released iconic singles Arada, Tizita, Menelik, Liguazew, and Hagere Ethiopia. Her last album was Menelik which was released in 2003 under AIT Records. Rahel then went to produce songs and songwriting career for other famous artists. Furthermore, she collaborated with legendary figures like Bahru Kegne and Yirga Dubale, becoming Ethiopia's cultural icon.

Rahel Yohannes died in Addis Ababa on 5 July 2026, at the age of 79. Her funeral was held at the Debre Mehret Sellassie Mehret Cathedral in Addis Ababa where family, government officials, colleagues, and thousands of fans gathered to celebrate her life and musical legacy.

== Discography ==
- Menelik (2003)

=== Undated discography ===
- Bati (Rahel Yohannes & Shambel Belayneh)
- Rahel Yohannes
