= Jonny Ragga =

Ethiopian reggae singer (born 1977)

Jonny Ragga ጆኒ ራጋ
- Born: Yohaness Bekele; 1977 (age 48–49); Addis Ababa, Ethiopia
- Origin: Addis Ababa
- Genres: Reggae; Afropop; Ethiopian music
- Occupations: Singer; songwriter; composer
- Instrument: Vocals
- Years active: 1994–present
- Labels: Nahom Records; Ella Records; Awtar Multimedia
- Formerly of: Medina Band
- Website: jonnyragga.com

Yohaness Bekele (Amharic: ዮሃንስ በቀለ; born 1977), known professionally as Jonny Ragga (Amharic: ጆኒ ራጋ), is an Ethiopian reggae singer, songwriter and composer noted for contributing to Ethiopian popular music in early 2000s. He was widely known for his first album Give Me the Key in 2005. After two decades, Jonny returned with his second album titled Wiha ena Esat (Water and Fire) in 2025.

== Life and career ==
Yohaness Bekele (a.k.a. Jonny Raga) was born in 1977 in Addis Ababa. At his early age, he had a passionate interest in reading and writing poetry. When he was in elementary school, his teachers encouraged him to read his poetry. He then enrolled to Bole high school where it shaped his musical interest, and find reggae music to be his favorite genre of all sort.

He then began disc jockey (DJ) at a place called Ram Jam in Addis Ababa, which was very popular at that time. At the age of 17, he joined local band named Medina Band and began touring across North America, Europe, Middle East and Africa. This time, he became prolific songwriter and composer as well as lyricist.

In 2005, Jonny released his breakthrough album titled Give Me the Key and made additional four track album with renowned Norwegian producer Barabass for the Save the Children on female genital mutilation in 2006. From the tracks, a single "Pick it Up" features a British artist Ny (Nyomi Grey), "Unfaithful Heart" featuring Afro-American artist K’alyn, "Hamer Girl" featuring South African rapper Zol along with famous Ethiopian artists like such as Chachi, Teddy Afro, Lafontain, Shewandagn Hailu and Zeritu Kebede.

On 28 September 2025, after long hiatus from music industry, Jonny released Wiha ena Esat (Water and Fire), containing 16 tracks.

== Discography ==
- Give Me the Key (2005)
- Wiha ena Esat (2025)
