= Orchestra Ethiopia =

Concert band in Ethiopia

Orchestra Ethiopia was an Ethiopian concert band formed in 1963 by the Egyptian-born American composer and ethnomusicologist Halim El-Dabh. The group, which was founded in Addis Ababa, comprised up to 30 traditional instrumentalists, vocalists, and dancers from many different Ethiopian regions and ethnic groups (including Amhara, Tigrayans, Oromo, Welayta, and Gimira). It was the first ensemble of its type, as these diverse instruments and ethnic groups previously had never played together. For a time, due to El-Dabh's efforts, the Orchestra was in residence at the Creative Arts Centre of Haile Selassie I University (now Addis Ababa University).

== Overview ==
Its main instruments included krar (medium lyre), masenqo (one-string fiddle), begena (large lyre), washint (end-blown flute with finger holes), embilta (end-blown flute without finger holes), malakat (straight trumpet), kabaro (drum), and other percussion instruments. On occasion, it also used the tom, an mbira-like instrument.

Many of Orchestra Ethiopia's performances were theatrical in nature, such as the drama The Potter, which was arranged by El-Dabh.

Following El-Dabh's departure from Ethiopia in 1964, subsequent directors included John G. Coe, an American Peace Corps volunteer (1964–1966); and Tesfaye Lemma (1966-1975), both of whom composed and arranged for the group. During Lemma's tenure as director, in 1968, another American Peace Corps volunteer, the Harvard-educated Charles Sutton, Jr., was assigned by the Peace Corps to assist the Orchestra as Administrator, a position in which he continued until 1970. Sutton had arrived in Ethiopia in 1966 and, immediately attracted to Ethiopia's traditional music, actually mastered the masenqo, studying with Orchestra member Getamesay Abebe. He began performing with the Orchestra in March 1967 (playing masenqo and singing in Amharic), at Lemma's invitation. The group performed frequently in hotels and at the U.S. Embassy in Addis Ababa, and appeared on national radio (including Radio Voice of the Gospel) and television. The group also had an audience with Emperor Haile Selassie I.

In the spring of 1969, due to the efforts of Sutton and the Peace Corps, Orchestra Ethiopia toured the Midwest and East Coast of the United States, under the name "The Blue Nile Group." The group performed in twenty cities, including Manhattan's Town Hall and The Ed Sullivan Show (in early March).

The group released two LP recordings, both entitled Orchestra Ethiopia. The first, subtitled "The Blue Nile Group," was released on Tempo Records c. 1969; and the second was released on Blue Nile Records, in 1973 or 1974. The Orchestra was also featured in a National Geographic documentary film entitled Ethiopia: The Hidden Empire (1970). By 1975, due to the upheavals caused by the Derg revolution, the group finally disbanded, although many of its musicians continued to perform with other groups, and as soloists. The group's washint player, Melaku Gelaw, lives and continues to perform and record in Washington, D.C.; Tesfaye Lemma, now retired, lives in Washington, D.C. Masenqo player Getamesay Abebe and drummer, vocalist, and star dancer Zerihun Bekkele, both retired, continue to live in Ethiopia. Washint player Yohannes Afework, who had replaced Gelaw, lives in Addis Ababa and is retired from the Mazegajabet (Municipality) Orchestra. Coe, the former Executive Director of the Wyoming Arts Council, is now retired and living in Wyoming; and Sutton performs today as a jazz pianist in Connecticut (and continues to play masenqo for special occasions). Several other of the Orchestra's members have died in Ethiopia.

A selection of the Orchestra's archival recordings transferred from reel to reel audiotape to audio CDs by the Ethiopian-American engineer Andrew Laurence was released in Europe in late 2007, and was released in the United States in February 2008, as the 23rd volume in Buda Musique's Ethiopiques CD series, with the liner notes having been prepared by Sutton and Lemma.

In 2007, a recording entitled Zoro Gettem (Reunion) was released on the Nahom Records label; the CD, recorded in Washington, D.C. in September 2006, features four of the Orchestra's former members (Charles Sutton, Getamesay Abbebe, Melaku Gelaw, and Tesfaye Lemma) performing repertoire they had performed together in the late 1960s.

== Discography ==
Albums

- Orchestra Ethiopia: Blue Nile Group (1969, Tempo Records)
- Orchestra Ethiopia (1973 or 1974, Blue Nile Records)

Contributing artist

- The Rough Guide to the Music of Ethiopia (2012, World Music Network)
