= Ethiopian hip-hop music =

Hip hop music genre in Ethiopia

Ethiopian hip hop music
- Stylistic origins: Hip-hop music; Ethiopian music
- Cultural origins: Early 2000s, Addis Ababa
- Derivative forms: Ethiopian music; jazz; funk; soul

Regional scenes
- Addis Ababa

Other topics
- African hip hop

Hip hop music emerged in Ethiopia from early 2000s combining traditional Ethiopian music to modern one. Early musicians were appeared MCs including Algorash, Mad Boys, Abyssinia Boys and Afaris. Furthermore, Teddy Yo popularized this genre, becoming one of the most iconic rappers in the genre.

Ethiopian hip hop music often deals with social and political issues, hard work, youth culture and romantic relations, usually sung in Amharic language. Addis Ababa is considered the regional scene of the genre where many musician blossom. The hip hop genre has been criticized by many conservatives of "disrupting the Ethiopian culture". Indeed, many musicians compromise with Ethiopian music genres such as Kassmasse, who blends his music with Northern Ethiopia highland music tizita and ambassel.

== History ==
Ethiopian hip hop music is relatively new phenomena emerged in early 2000s. Combining traditional music with modern one, the Ethiopian hip hop usually sung in Amharic language. Teddy Yo and Lij Michael often credited as the pioneer of the genre. Addis Ababa is the regional and cultural scene of Ethiopian hip hop music with pioneering artists citing their influences such as Tupac, Eminem, Jay-Z and LL Cool J. Inspiring youth culture, the rapid growth of rap music often supposed to dismay among conservatives in the Ethiopian society and disrupt Ethiopian culture. Teddy Yo dismissed this claim by saying "We didn’t steal hip hop from America,” he says. “It came up from our own culture." He noted that the old play of "shilela" and "kererto" could be combined into rap form before engaging to warfare in order to improvise "essentially battle rap".

Lyrics of Ethiopian hip hop music often focus on theme of hard work and social and political issues such as poverty, materialism and education while other tracks value glamour of beautiful woman. Early pioneering MCs for this genre includes Algorash, Mad Boys, Abyssinia Boys and Afaris. Teddy described them "basically, they just took the music from the US and made mixtapes.”

In 2020s, the genre gained wide popularity due innovation of Kassmasse, bringing a unique style and perspective to the scene. He often mixed with jazz, funk, soul and more prominently tizita and ambassel sounds. Jemberu Demeke is another example of this feature whose genre described as "dynamic" with "youth optimism" along his use of hip hop with traditional Ethiopian music such as jazz funk, and soul music. His debut album interpolated Mulatu Astatke, who was regarded as the "father of Ethio-jazz".

== List of musicians ==
- Lij Michael
- Jemberu Demeke
- Kassmasse
