= Kuku Sebsibe =

Ethiopian singer

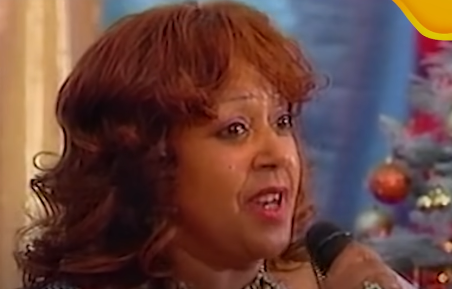

Background information
- Born: Addis Ababa, Ethiopia
- Genres: Ethiopian music; tizita
- Occupation: Singer
- Instrument: Vocals
- Years active: 1980s–present
- Labels: Nahom Records; AIT Records

Kuku Sebsibe (also spelled Kuku Sebsebe) is an Ethiopian singer. She generally performs with synthesizer and drum machine accompaniment, occasionally with the addition of traditional instruments such as the krar or other instruments such as the electric guitar. While she uses modern instruments and harmonies, her vocal style is essentially traditional, using modes such as tizita.

== Life and career ==
Kuku Sebsibe was born in Addis Ababa, Ethiopia. She spent a majority of her education at Nazareth school and graduated from American Mission. Her interest in music sprouted from a very young age. Since the age of nine, she used to entertain her classmates by mimicking all the popular artists of both Amharic and English music by using her lunch box as a drum. Her passion and love for music was nourished by her father, Dejazmach Sebsibe Shiberu's jam sessions at their home and his musical, peptic background. She lived in the Washington, DC, United States for many years but moved back to Ethiopia c. 2003.

At the age 15, Kuku presented her father's own property, as well as collections of other verses to her favorite singer Muluken Melesse. The first time she performed on stage with was at her graduation party at Hilton hotel. Her classmates accustomed to her caroling pushed her on stage and set her way for a career in music. This musical act led her to work both with Ibex and Wallias band. She worked with Ibex band at Ras hotel for short time and went on to be the first female singer to perform at Hilton hotel with Wallias band appearing 5 days a week.

Shortly after her first gig, Kuku then joined Roha band at Ghion Hotel, becoming the first singer of the group, and recorded her first hit single "Ingidayenesh" with Alemayehu Eshete.

Because of the popularity of the song she continued to recite her debut album with Roha band titled Fikreh Beretabegne. She also charmed her fans at villa Verde restaurant, one of the best place at the time where she performed with Melesse Gesesse on the piano. She released her second album Ajere Meweded and first video clip on ETV that showcased the famous Sebsibe style braids. She began to perform concerts, as her fan base was growing, both nationally and internationally. In Ethiopia, she showed regularly at cinema in Merkato and also in Nazareth, both with Roha band. Her biggest fan that was known by all was the cake man that used to go to all her shows and always brought the celebrity a personalized cake to wish her a good luck.

Her first international concert was at Djibouti Sheraton with Roha band where they performed along the red sea with the best view of the ocean. Shortly after, she put a show at the Sana Sheraton in Yemen, with Ethio Star Band. Her fans were so excited by her appearance, they showered her with gifts of gold and money as a customary sign of respect and to show their love and honor for the musical icon. A gesture Kuku keeps in her memories and thanks all of her fans for their hospitality. She also performed in Abu Dhabi and Dubai with Roha band. During her time as an emerging artist, Kuku performed alongside Mahmud Ahmad, Tekele Tsefazgi, Ali Birra, Levont Fondanchi and Mengesha Getahun.

In the late 1980s, Kuku made her move to United States. She performed her first U.S. concert at Hyatt Regency in 1988 and brought the house down for her Ethiopian fans outside of their home land. She began performing in all major cities in the U.S. mainly with Teddy Mekonnen. She also began her first international tour all over major European cities. Settling down in DC and Virginia area, she began to sing at Meskerem restaurant with Teddy Mak on the keyboard. With Teddy, she released her album Ethiopia following by Gize with Abegaz Kibrework. Kuku then took a hiatus from her singing career to be a mother, giving birth to her son Caleb, in 1996.

Kuku moved her family back to Ethiopia in 2002 and immediately recorded her album Gize Setegne with Elias Melka and most recently the Tizita album with Express Band. The Tizita album is one Kuku holds dear to her heart and looked forward to recording most, eager to celebrate ballads of past era. Most recently she has performed in many cities in Europe, the Middle East, South Africa, Bahirdar, Gambella and Hawassa. Locally she has worked at night at Frank Addis, Indigo, Harrar Mesob, Weregenu, Harlam jazz, Fahrenheit club and is now crooning at Jazz Amba, the newly renovated Taitu hotel. She recently released her dynamic new album Chalkubet, which was arranged and mixed by Abiy Arka and contained 15 songs. Sebsibe sings of the eternal power of time in being capable in living with people by managing a relation and its effect on life and the world around us. She has mingled flashy contemporary grooves and traditional Ethiopian flavors to lead as a journey in Chalkubet.

In 2025, Kuku released her breakthrough single "Demama" featuring Teddy Afro, their second collaboration since the 2013 single "Yebereha Hager".

== Discography ==
- Geeze (1999)
- Tinish Geze Sitegn (2003)
- Tizita (2005)
- Chalkubet (2013)

=== Singles ===
- "Sebebe" (2015)
- "Demama" (2025)
- "Dejazmach" (2025)
