= Endegna =

Ethiopian girl group (2013–2020)

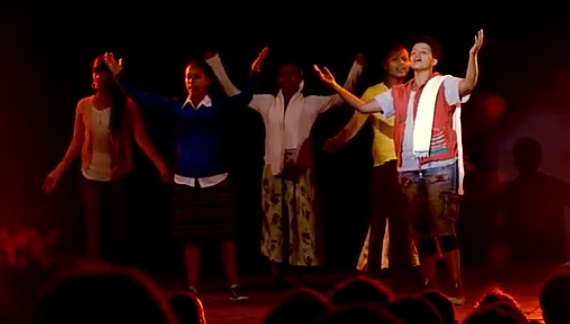
- Endegna performing at Addis Ababa University for their film Yegna (2015)

Background information
- Also known as: Yegna (2013–17)
- Origin: Addis Ababa, Ethiopia
- Genres: Ethiopian music
- Years active: 2013–2019; 2020
- Labels: Hope Music Entertainment; Minew Shewa Entertainment; Admas Music
- Members: Teref Kassahun; Lemlem Hailemichael; Zebiba Girma; Eyerusalem Kelemework; Rahel Getu

Endegna (Amharic: እንደኛ), previously known as Yegna (Amharic: የኛ), was an Ethiopian five-piece girl group, originated in Addis Ababa. The group gained prominence after releasing two singles, "Abet" (2013) and "Taitu" (2014). Their earlier lyrical contents reference female empowerment and opposition towards violence against women. After the successful hit "Fikir" in 2019, the group sought solo career, starting from Rahel Getu. They were once reunited with the promotional song "Yeabay Zemen Lijoch" for the Grand Ethiopian Renaissance Dam in 2020. However, they resumed solo career afterward.

Their legacy contributed the formation of new teen vocal group called Yegna. They debut a television show Yegna: The Story Of All of Us in 2019.

== History ==
=== 2013–15: Formation and early years ===
The 5-member group was formed in April 2013 as part of the internationally funded Girl Hub scheme, which also operates in Nigeria and Rwanda. The group members are Teref Kassahun (nicknamed Melat) Lemlem Hailemichael (Mimi), Zebiba Girma (Emuye), Eyerusalem Kelemework (Sara) and Rahel Getu (Lemlem). Each member of the group has a different stage persona and nickname. Melat's character is that of the city girly princess, Mimi's that of the tough swaggering streetwise girl, Emuye is the vivacious music-lover, Sara the quiet studious one and Lemlem the steady maternal type.

They produced music videos and performed on Ethiopian radio in a weekly drama and talk show for young women, addressing issues such as forced marriage, isolation and teen pregnancies, broadcasting on Sheger FM in Addis Ababa to a population of some 20 million. Their first live performance was at the Ethiopian National Theatre in May 2013. The group claim statistically significant change in knowledge, attitudes and behaviours though their work.

After the success of their debut single "Abet" featuring Haile Roots in 2013, they released the second single, "Taitu", in 2014, with collaboration with singer Aster Aweke. Taitu was an Ethiopian queen consort in the early 20th century.

Following their career launch, they released the self-titled film Yegna in April 2015. In this film, Yegna aspires to achieve success in the music industry by attending a music competition at Addis Ababa University. In the final scene, they perform "Sima Belew" where spectators and judges listen attentively and ultimately they win the contest. Singer Munit Mesfin makes a cameo appearance as a judge. "Sima Belew" was subsequently used to tribute the Ethiopian Christians who were slain by the ISIL militant group on 19 April 2015.

=== 2018–19: Endegna, on hiatus and solo career ===
In 2018, the group changed their name to Endegna, with release of new songs "Leman Biye" on 8 June 2018, "Ho Blen" for Ethiopian New Year on 6 September 2018 and "Fikir" on 9 February 2019.

The group saw a brief breakup in mid-2019 to pursue their individual career. On 28 February 2019, Rahel released "Tilobegn", Zebiba released "Gerager" on 8 August 2019, Lemlem released "Gedam" on 18 October 2019, Teref released "Demo'Na" on 28 February 2020 Eyerusalem released "Menagn" on 17 July 2021.

=== 2020–present: "Yeabay Zemen Lijoch" and solo career perpetuation ===
In May 2020, the group announced that they were reunited and would release another single called "Yeabay Zemene Lijoch" for the Grand Ethiopian Renaissance Dam, which was released on 22 May 2020. The group fate is still unexplained, but rather they prefer to continue their solo career in the meantime.

On 4 September 2021, Rahel released debut album called Etemete, making her the first member from the band to release album.

== Members ==
- Lemlem Hailemichael (lead vocal)
- Teref Kassahun
- Zebiba Girma
- Eyerusalem Kelemewerk
- Rahel Getu

== Other ventures ==
=== UK state sponsorship ===
In January 2017, the UK's Secretary of State for International Development Priti Patel announced that following a review of the band's £5.2 million Department for International Development (DFID) funding there would be no further financial support given by the UK taxpayer. DFID affirmed their commitment to empowering women and girls but cited concerns about the effectiveness and value for money of the aid. In response, the managing organisation Girl Effect pointed to the impact of Yegna on millions of people in Ethiopia; illustrating this by quoting a girl in Amhara as saying: "Everything that Yegna stands for – peace, support, friendship – has changed my outlook on life and made me feel proud to be a girl."

== Legacy ==
Following their name change to Endegna, a new group called Yegna was formed in 2019. They debut TV drama series called Yegna: The Story Of All of Us on 17 March 2019. The series principal actors includes Blen Alem (as Lomi), Tirhas Gebru (Fikir), Tsedenia Lemma (Tsega), Betelehem Sherefedin (Hana), and Tsinat Terefe (Alem). The plot involves around group of teens lives in rural background; it also shows their friendship and teaches about gender equality and seeks to educate countryside people. Similar to Endegna, the group aimed at music and to form a band.

== Discography ==
| Title | Release date | Collaborating artists |
|---|---|---|
| "Abet" | 2013 | Haile Roots |
| "Taitu" | 2014 | Aster Aweke |
| "Leman Biye" | 8 June 2018 | – |
| "Ho Blen" | 6 September 2018 | – |
| "Fikir" | 9 February 2019 | – |
| "Yeabay Zemene Lijoch" | 22 May 2020 | Various artists |

== Filmography ==
| Title | Release date |
|---|---|
| Yegna | 16 April 2015 |
