= Aweke =

Aweke (Amharic: አወቀ (āwek’e), its literal meaning in the Amharic-language being "know", "notice", "realize") is an Amharic-language male given name which like all Ethiopian male given names can also be used as a patronymic surname and may refer to:

- Aster Aweke (born 1959), Ethiopian singer
- Aweke Ayalew (born 1993), Ethiopian-born Bahraini middle-distance and long-distance runner
