= Kabu (album) =

Studio album by Aster Aweke
- Released: 1991
- Genre: Ethiopian music
- Label: Columbia
- Producer: Iain Scott, Bunt Stafford Clark

Aster Aweke chronology
Aster (1990)	Kabu (1991)	Ebo (1993)

Kabu is the second album by the Ethiopian singer Aster Aweke. It was released in 1991 via Columbia Records.

The album peaked at No. 4 on Billboard's World Music chart. Aweke supported the album with several North American concert dates.

== Production ==
The Washington D.C.–based Aweke sang the song lyrics in her native Amharic language. The album was produced by Iain Scott and Bunt Stafford Clark. Aweke mixed soul music sounds and raï with Ethiopian instruments, including the krar.

== Critical reception ==
Professional ratings
Review scores
Source	Rating
AllMusic	3/5 stars
Calgary Herald	B+
Robert Christgau	(choice cut)
The Encyclopedia of Popular Music	4/5 stars
Entertainment Weekly	B+
The Philadelphia Inquirer	2/4 stars

Trouser Press deemed the album "heavy on midtempo grooves and ballads," writing that "the synthesizer on 'Kabu (Sacred Rock)' mimics a bass kalimba while Aweke’s vocals swoop and soar like a hummingbird." Spin called it "mildly disappointing," but praised Aweke's voice for cutting through the "snooty" production. Entertainment Weekly thought that "Kabu broadens the U.S.-based singer’s range with tight waves of fusion-based rock over which she can madly surf." Robert Christgau praised "Yedi Gosh (My Guy)".

The New York Times wrote that Aweke's "voice, thin, but sure and pliable, weaves in and around, stenciling delicate melodies against the band." The Calgary Herald determined that "the horn charts are brash and brassy while the marimbas, shakers and bass convey a sense of the primal." Stereo Review concluded that "Aweke unleashes her inner self, uttering oddly twisted wails and singing intricately elaborated melodic lines that can be as lovely as a piece of lace or as tough as a spider's web." The Province opined that "Aweke sounds more sure of her direction and more at home in music that also is a happier blend of her roots and North American pop and jazz."

AllMusic wrote that "Aweke's voice sounds even earthier and more passionate than on her debut album."

== Track listing ==
No.	Title	Length
1.	"Yedi Gosh (My Guy)"
2.	"Yas-Oh (Grab It, Get It On)"
3.	"Kabu (Sacred Rock)"
4.	"Kezira"
5.	"Bati"
6.	"Tchewata (Romance)"
7.	"Eyoha"
8.	"Bitchengna (Loneliness)"
