= Jano Band =

Ethiopian rock band

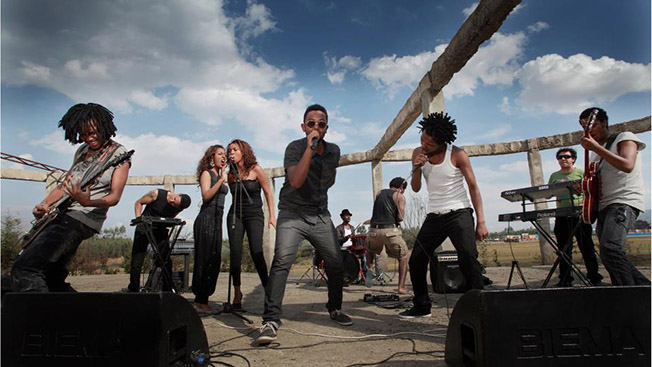

Background information
- Origin: Addis Ababa, Ethiopia
- Genres: Ethiopian music; progressive rock; acoustic
- Years active: 2011–2019
- Members: Samuel Tafera (general manager); Dibekulu Tafesse; Hailu Amerga; Hewan Gebrewold; Haleluya Tekletsadik; Michael Hailu; Kirubel Tesfaye; Yohannes Mekonnen; Daniel Negash
- Website: jano.band

Jano Band is an Ethiopian rock band formed by its entrepreneurs Ermyas Amelga, Bill Laswell and former manager Addis Gessesse in 2011. It versatilely mixes progressive rock with Ethiopian music. The band includes two female back and lead vocalists, two lead male vocalists, and four musicians who play bass guitar, rhythm guitar, drum, and keyboards.

== History ==
=== 2011–2012: Formation and Ertale ===
The band was formed by entrepreneurs Ermyas Amelga and former manager Addis Gessesse in 2011. Jano's debut album Ertale was released in 2012. The album was named as a portmanteau of an active volcano in Afar Region. The songs in the album were partly written by the renowned Ethiopian lyricist Yilma Gebreab and partly by them. The prominent singles in this album are "Ethiopiawit Konjo", "Yigermal", "Irasen", "Ayrak", "Irrekum", "Gude", "Mariye", "Mehed Mehed", "Tazebkut", and "Anchi Hagere". This is the first ever rock album in Ethiopia. The audio and video of the song "Ayrak" from the album became quickly popular among the media in Ethiopia.

=== 2013–2017: Major achievements and further releases ===
After the release of the album, Jano had its debut show in April 2012 with shows at Sheraton Addis and the renowned Club H_{2}O. Before they went on a big tour to Europe and the Americas, Jano had countrywide concerts in November at the regional cities of Bahir Dar, Dessie, Jimma, Arba Minch, to introduce the unique sound nationally. Starting from mid-December, Jano began tour covering in Italy, Sweden, the Netherlands, the United States, Israel, and the Middle East.

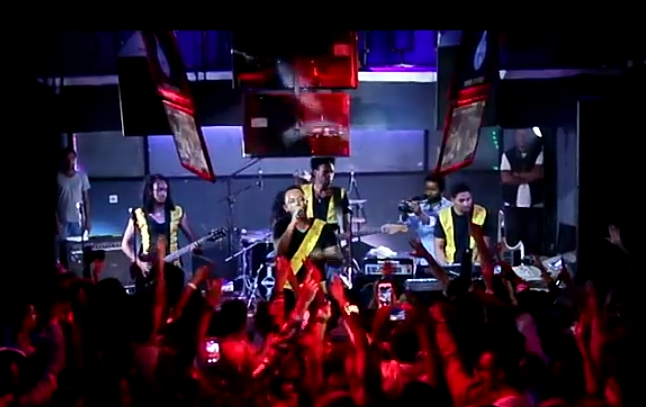
Jano Band performing at Club H_{2}0, Addis Ababa in 2015

In September 2015, Jano made live performance at Club H_{2}O in Addis Ababa; at the concert, they performed "Darign", vocal from Hewan, "Aynema Wedajish" and "Fikrish New Yegodagn" performed by Dibekulu and "Erikum" by Hailu, Diriyan by Haleluya Tekletsadik. Those singles originally belonged to 20th-century singers like Muluken Melesse and Tilahun Gessesse. The videos went viral on YouTube and the song "Darign" re-released as bonus track of their second album Lerasih New. In the wake of their fame, Jano released "Yinegal" in summer 2015, vocal from Hailu. In the music video, the band performs in the rubble of a house and upon travelling, their van stopped due to insufficient fuel. The group then shove the vehicle to enable the motor.

In 2017, Jano also became the first Ethiopian band to feature on Coke Studio Africa alongside the South African singer Shekinah in Nairobi, Kenya.

=== 2018–2019: Lerasih New, "Tikur Almaz", "Rega", and "Abeba Ena Nib" ===
On 1 February 2018, Jano released their second album called Lerasih New. The album met with positive reviews and won multiple awards. The engineering process of the album was done in BluMusica studio in Turin, Italy and the mastering was done by Lurseen mastering studio in Los Angeles, California, United States.

On 4 October 2018, they released "Tikur Almaz" through Admas Music. The song gained numerous accolades internationally. The music video which was Directed by Daniel Tamrat shows the group of warriors (the band) combating each other to demonstrate Ethiopian nationalism. On 9 September 2019, "Rega" was released featuring electronic music duo Ahadu with rapping credit by Ezra.

On 16 November 2019, the group released "Abeba Ena Nib", vocals from Dibekulu and Haleluya Tekletsadik. The song lyrics were composed by Yilma Gebreab, arranged by Andy Bete Zema, while mixing and mastering held by Abegazu Kibrework Shiota. The music video was directed by Daniel Tamrat.

=== 2020–present: Solo career beginnings ===
In early 2020, Hewan released a song titled "Ane", and her breakout single "Kemenew" in 2020—the latter gave her popularity. This devised other bandmates to establish their solo career, such as Haleluya and Dibekulu. Dibekulu announced on Twitter for his debut album following a single titled "Qesa" release on 8 May 2021. Haleluya Tekletsadik released her first solo album in 2022 titled Tewedaj.

== Musical style ==
The band usually performs progressive rock combining with Ethiopian music, percussion instruments include guitar, keyboards, while traditional instruments like masenqo and krar are also common. They also perform electronic music, and more specifically acoustic music.

== Band members ==
The band members include two male lead vocalist and instrumentalist, two female lead and back vocalists, four background instrumentalist and one manager.

=== Main ===
- Samuel Tefera (manager)
- Dibekulu Tafesse (vocals)
- Hailu Amerga (vocals)
- Hewan Gebrewold (vocals)
- Haleluya Tekletsadik (vocals)

=== Background ===
- Michael Hailu (lead director, guitar)
- Kirubel Tesfaye (leader, synthesizer)
- Yohannes Mekonnen (drums)
- Daniel Negash (bass)

== Discography ==
=== Studio albums ===
Title	Release date
Ertale	26 June 2012
Lerasih New	1 February 2018

=== Non-album singles ===
Title	Release date	Vocal artists
"Yinegal"	2015	Hailu Amerga
"Darign"	2016; 2018 (re-release)	Hewan Gebrewold
"Aynema Wedajish"	2016	Dibekulu Tafesse
"Fikrish New Yegodagn"	2016	Dibekulu Tafesse
"Erikum"	2016	Hailu Amerga
"Tikur Almaz"	4 October 2018	–
"Rega"	9 September 2019	Featuring Ahadu and Ezra
"Abeba Ena Nib"	16 November 2019	Haleluya Tekletsadik and Dibekulu Tafesse

== Concert tours ==
Jano has performed in Ethiopia and abroad. In Ethiopia, they performed concerts in Addis Ababa, Arba Minch, Bahir Dar, Dessie, Jimma, and Mekelle. Internationally they have performed in Brazil, Italy, Jamaica, Japan, the Netherlands, New Zealand, Sweden, the United States, and the United Kingdom.

== Awards and nominations ==
Jano has been nominated for their single "Yinegal" on Leza radio listeners choice award in 2016. In addition to this, the band has also been nominated for best Artist/Duo/Group in African rock alongside the South African singer Loki Rothman and best African group alongside the Kenyan group Sauti Sol, and the Ivorian group Toofan on AFRIMA3.0 in the same year.

== See also ==
- List of Ethiopians
