= Kabu =

Kabu or KABU may refer to:

- Kaabu a 13th–18th century empire in what is today Senegal
- Kabu, Syria, a town in Syria
- toshiyori kabu (年寄株), a coaching licence in sumo
- Kabu, the Japanese word for turnip
- Kabu, one of the Gym Leaders in Pokémon Sword and Shield
- KABU, an American radio station
- Kabu (album), a 1991 album by Ethiopian singer Aster Aweke
