= Kiros Alemayehu =

Ethiopian singer (1948–1994)

Kiros Alemayehu ኪሮስ አለማየሁ
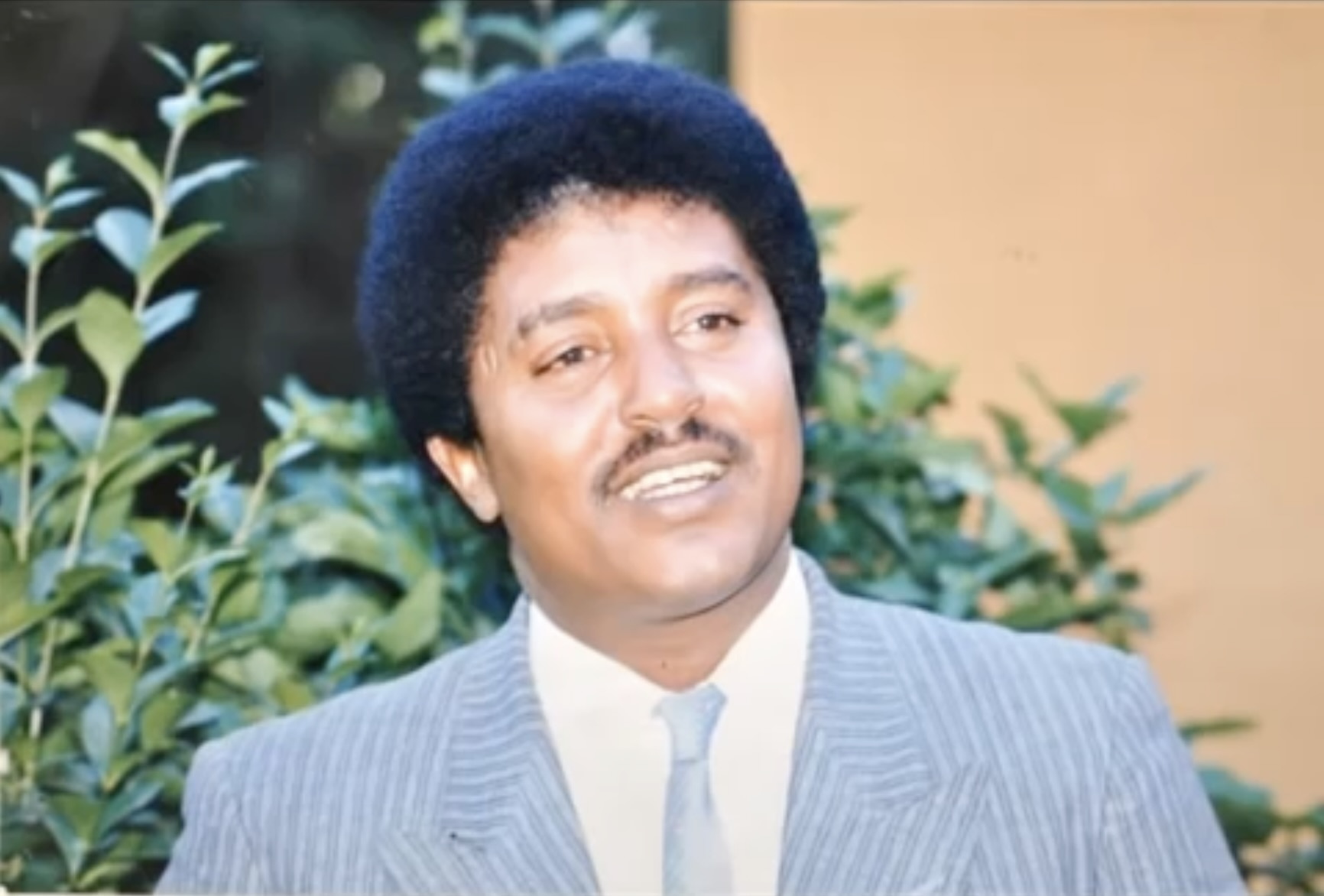
- Picture of Kiros Alemayehu

Background information
- Born: 26 July 1948; Sa'esit Tse'ada Emba, Tigray Province, Ethiopian Empire
- Origin: Tigray Region, Ethiopia
- Died: 13 October 1994 (aged 46) Addis Ababa, Ethiopia
- Genres: Ethiopian music; Tigrigna music
- Occupations: Singer; Songwriter; Lyricist
- Instruments: Krar
- Years active: 1970s–1994

Kiros Alemayehu (Tigrinya: ኪሮስ ዓለማየሁ; 26 July 1948 – 13 October 1994) was a Tigrayan singer. He was born in Tigray region, Saesi Tsaedaemba and was the only child to his parents.

== Biography ==
=== Early life ===
Kiros was born to his father Grazmach Alemayehu Meles and Qeleb Gebremeskel in the eastern part of Tigray region, in a village known as Saesi Tsaedaemba on 26 July 1948. He went to school in the nearby city of Wukro and then joined Atse Yohannes High School in Mekelle.

=== Professional career ===
Kiros was a prolific songwriter and singer. He popularized Tigrigna songs through his albums to the non-Tigrinya speaking Ethiopians. Before joining Ras Theatre in 1975E.C (circa 1982–1983) where he published his first album, Kiros had worked as assistant trainer of Tigray Musical Troupe (ትግራይ ኪነት). Some of his songs include "Anguay fisis", "Fililiy","Selam Hawa", "Suwur Fikri" "Adey Mekele". Kiros is well known for his songs that highlighted the ups and downs of everyday human life including songs that reflected the social and political atmospheres of his time. Many admire Kiros for his unique writing style and poetic abilities making him one of the best artists of his day. His music remains impactful till this day as his songs are made popular through steaming services such as Spotify and Apple. Kiros along with other musicians had played in Libya and other middle eastern countries. A memorial library is under construction in Wukro near his birthplace.

=== Death and funeral ===
Kiros died from intestinal complications on 13 October 1994.

== See also ==
- Music of Ethiopia
