= Qenet =

Amharic term for musical modes in Ethiopian music

Qenet (Amharic: ቅኝት) is a term used for a single pentatonic musical scale developed in the Amhara Region of Ethiopia. A qiñit consists of a set of intervals defining the mode of a musical piece or the tuning scale of the instrument playing the piece. There are four main qiñit scales: Tizita (ትዝታ), Bati (ባቲ), Ambassel (አምባሳል), and Anchihoye (አንቺሆዬ). Three additional modes are variations on the above: Tizita minor, Bati major, and Bati minor. Some songs take the name of their qiñit, such as Tizita, a song of reminiscence.

== History ==
Ashenafi Kebede was one of the early scholars to standardize the kignits of northern and central Ethiopia. His work contributed to the documentation and study of Ethiopian musical traditions.
