= Asnaketch Worku =

Ethiopian singer and musician (1935–2011)

Asnaketch Worku አስናቀች ወርቁ
- Born: Asnaketch Worku c. 1935; Addis Ababa, Ethiopian Empire
- Died: 14 September 2011 (aged 75–76) Addis Ababa, Ethiopia,
- Genres: Ethiopian music; Tizita; Ambassel
- Occupations: Singer; Krar instrumentalist; Actress
- Years active: 1950s–2000's

Asnaketch Worku (Amharic: አስናቀች ወርቁ; c. 1935 – 14 September 2011) was an Ethiopian singer who sang in the Amharic language and a krar instrumentalist, the instrument which symbolized her fame during the 1960s and 1970s. Asnaketch also had a long distinguished career as an actress.

== Biography ==
Asnakech Worku was born in the Sidist Kilo neighborhood of Addis Ababa and was raised in the city. Asnakech hails from the Amhara people. Born in the Sidist Kilo, Worku She never met her father, and her parents split up soon after she was born. Worku was raised by her godmother, who she didn't particularly like, after her mother died when she was three. Later, Elfinesh Marefia, her older sister, moved in with her, and the two of them enjoyed attending plays and concerts. Buying her first krar for only 25 cents, Asnaketch taught herself how to play and began performing in small bars and cabarets. However, she quit her job at a bar on Churchill Road due to low pay and harassment. After a case of unrequited love, she grew depressed, stopped eating for three days, and was briefly chained to her bed.

She was the first theatre actress in Ethiopia, making her debut in 1952 at the City Hall Theatre in the play "Ye Fikir Chora" (Rays of Love). She refused the role at first, but reconsidered after her friends and Italian husband talked her into taking the part. In 1955, she took vocal lessons under Franz Zelwecker. Playwright Tesfaye Gessesse described her as the "pearl of the stage", and she frequently played unsympathetic characters. During the 1950s, she was a controversial figure due to her beauty and performances in romantic dramas. Despite her long and distinguished career on the stage, Asnaketch is known primarily not for her career as an actress, but for her skills with the krar and her quick wit and inspired improvisations. Her musical career really began shortly after she played Desdemona in Othello in 1963. In April 1974, her first album, "Krar songs by Asnaketch Worku" was released under the Philips-Ethiopia label. It achieved moderate success but was pulled from the market after the revolution began. Her songs were played on the radio in the 1970s and were popular. Asnaketch went on a 16-week tour of Europe and America in 1987 on the behest of the military government to thank foreign nations for their help during famine-plagued years. Asnaketch worked at the National Theatre for 30 years before retiring in 1989, although she continued to act in the 1990s. She was well known for wearing earrings with the portrait of emperor Haile Selassie.

In the early 1990s, she toured a couple of times in Europe. In 1995 Asnakech recorded the CD "Ende Jerusalem" for Acoustic Music in Germany with Begenna player Alemu Aga. These were her last recordings. In 1998 she received an award for lifetime achievement from the Ethiopian Fine Arts and Mass Media Prize Trust. In 2003, Buda Musique released Éthiopiques 16: The Lady With the Krar, a compact disc which compiles Asnaketch's recordings from the mid-1970s. At the same time, a biography of Asnaketch was released.

She died on 14 September 2011, at Bete Zata Hospital in Addis Ababa. Her funeral was held at St. Trinity Cathedral in Addis Ababa. A documentary of her life entitled Asni: Courage, Passion, and Glamour in Ethiopia came out in 2013, featuring interviews with her in which she discusses her music and life. The film was directed by Rachael Samuel, who called Worku "Ethiopia's Edith Piaf".
