= Kassmasse =

Ethiopian singer

- Origin: Addis Ababa
- Genres: Ethiopian music; Art pop
- Occupation: Singer
- Years active: 2020–present
- Label: Qena Lib www.kassmasse.com

Fikiru Sema, known professionally as Kassmasse (Amharic: ካስማሰ), is an Ethiopian singer. He was widely known for his first EP titled Maleda (2020) and the first album Bahil/Weg released in 2022.

== Career ==
Kassmasse started his career with debut EP called Maleda, which was released in late December 2020 by Meedo Records. Kassmasse then released his second album called Bahil/Weg in 2022, featuring musician Julian Marley. The album garnered his popularity for introducing traditional Ethiopian music genre with pop music. Thanks to collaboration of reggae musician Protoje, Kassmasse remained highly celebrated artist. In March 2022, Kassmasse awarded for Best East African Artist at the 2022 All Africa Music Awards (AFRIMA) with 3 nominations and 1 win.

== Discography ==
- Maleda (2020)
- Bahil/Weg (2022)
- Sanqa Souq (2023)
