= Eténèsh Wassié =

Ethiopian jazz singer

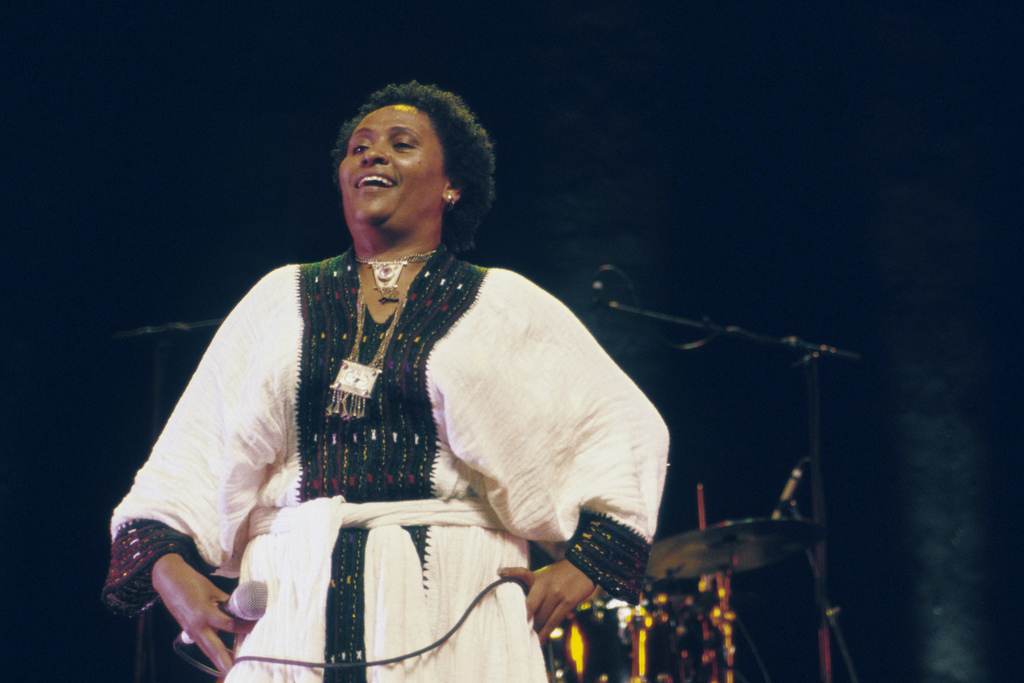

Background information
- Born: 1971 (age 54–55); Gondar, Ethiopia
- Genre: Jazz
- Occupation: Singer
- Label: Buda Musique
- Website: eteneshwassie.wixsite.com/eteneshmusic

Eténèsh Wassié (born 1971) is an Ethiopian jazz singer, renowned for her collaborative approach to music and performance.

== Biography ==
Wassié was born in 1971 in Gondar to an Ethiopian Orthodox family. She began performing in the 1990s in Addis Ababa in azmaribèt - a crossover between cabaret and the Azmari vocal tradition. She is renowned for singing in Amharic and is a leading blues singer in Addis Ababa where she lives.

In 2007 Wassié began a collaboration with Mathieu Sourisseau, which fused her knowledge of traditional music and his jazz guitar, known as Ethio-jazz. She performed at Seine-Saint Denis Festival in 2018, celebrating twenty years of Éthiopiques.

== Discography ==
- Zeraf! (2007, album with Le Tigre des Plantanes)
- Belo Belo (2010, album with Mathieu Sourisseau)
- Yene Alem (2018, album with Mathieu Sourisseau)
- Hagir Fikir (2020, single with Ozferti)
