= Imperial Tiger Orchestra =

- Origin: Geneva, Switzerland
- Genres: Ethiopian, world
- Years active: 2007—present
- Website: imperialtigerorchestra.blogspot.ch

Imperial Tiger Orchestra is a Swiss group of modern popular Ethiopian music. Its name hints at the Imperial bodyguard band of the Halie Selassie era and Monty Python’s “Tiger in Africa” sketch. It was formed after a jam organized by Genevan trumpet player Raphaël Anker. The band has released three albums and played in Europe, Southern Africa and Ethiopia. It also worked with Ethiopian musicians such as Endress Hassen and the singer Hamelmal Abate.
