= Jemberu Demeke =

Ethiopian singer, producer and rapper (born 2000)

- Birth name: Jedidya Wondwossen
- Born: 2000 (age 24–25); Addis Ababa, Ethiopia
- Origin: Addis Ababa
- Genres: Trap; hip hop
- Occupations: Rapper; producer; singer
- Years active: 2022–present
- Labels: Meedo Records

Jedidya Wondwossen (Amharic: ጂዲዲያ ዎንዶዎሰን; born 2000), known by his stage name Jemberu Demeke (Amharic: ጀምበሩ ደመቀ), is an Ethiopian singer, producer and rapper known for his mixing Amharic rap, trap music, and samples from various contemporary styles.

He is widely known for his eponymous EP Jemberu Demeke (2022) and Esatu Se (2024), as well as his songs, "Ayferam Gam Ayferam", "Adwa" and "Teff Teff (Hustle Grind)" featuring fellow rapper UNO.

== Biography ==
Jedidya Wondwossen was born in Addis Ababa in 2000 in a village called Bella. He pursued his senior career while studying software engineering at Addis Ababa Science and Technology University under his stage name Jemberu Demeke. He unique genre including blending Amharic rap, trap music, and samples from various contemporary styles. His debut EP named Jemberu Demeke released in April 2022 that features prominent musician and arranger Mulatu Astatke. Notable singles include "Ayferam Gam Ayferam" and "Adwa". In September 2023, Jemberu released "Teff Teff (Hustle Grind)" featuring rapper UNO. In March 2024, he released his second album called Esatu Se, which features his identical dub fusion.

== Discography ==
EPs

- Jemberu Demeke (2022)

Albums

- Esatu Se (2024)

Singles

- "Adwa" (2022)
- "Teff Teff (Hustle Grind)" (2023)
