= Ethiopian National Defence Force Band =

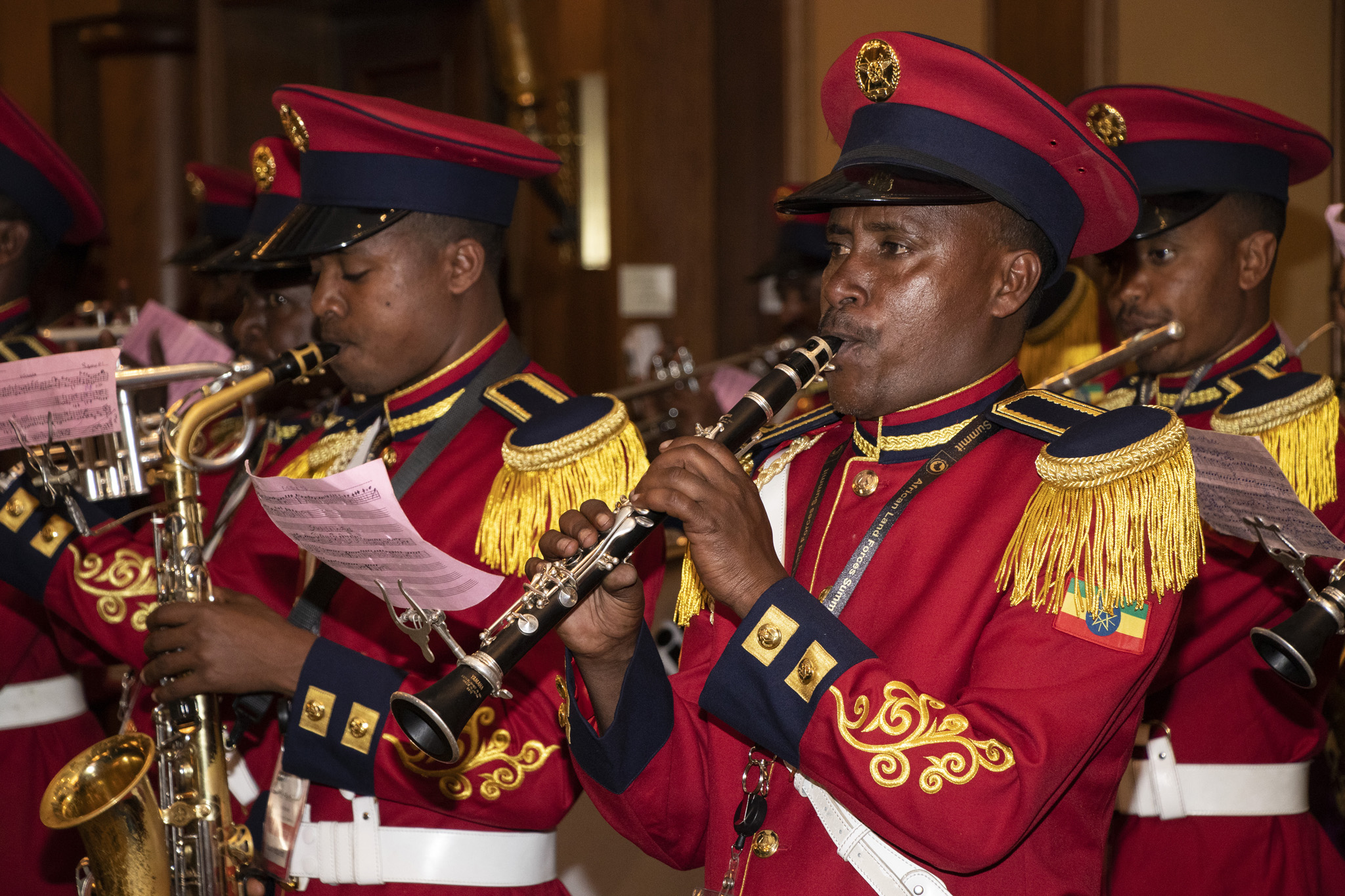
- Members of the band during the African Land Forces Summit in Addis Ababa in 2020
- Active: 1934–present
- Country: Ethiopian Empire; Derg; PDRE; Ethiopia
- Branch: Ethiopian National Defense Force
- Type: Military band
- Garrison/HQ: Addis Ababa

Commanders
- Notable commanders: Colonel Lemma Demissew

The Ethiopian National Defence Force Band (ENDFB) (Amharic: የኢትዮጵያ ብሔራዊ መከላከያ ባንድ, romanized: ye'ītiyop'iya biḥērawī mekelakeya banidi) is a military band of the Ethiopian National Defense Force. It is located in the Ethiopian capital of Addis Ababa for ceremonial use by the state. It is composed of a marching band, a big band, a corps of drums, and a youth division.

== History ==
=== Ground Forces Band ===
The first permanent military band in the country took the form of the Imperial Bodyguard Band (Kibur Zebegna) of the Ethiopian Empire, being formed in 1929 under Swiss conductor Andre Nicod. It originally consisted of just over a dozen chosen slaves from Welega. It was the first African nation to implement western style military music conventions. In 1943, the Ground Force Music Department was founded upon the order of the Minister for War, Ras Abebe Aregai, after Emperor Haile Selassie return from exile in England two years before. It initially consisted of 65 members, with Alemu Wolde Selassie and Agop Nalbandian (An ethnic Armenian, who was the brother of Arba Lijoch Fanfare bandleader Kevork Nalbandian) serving as instructors. It consisted of four sub-units:

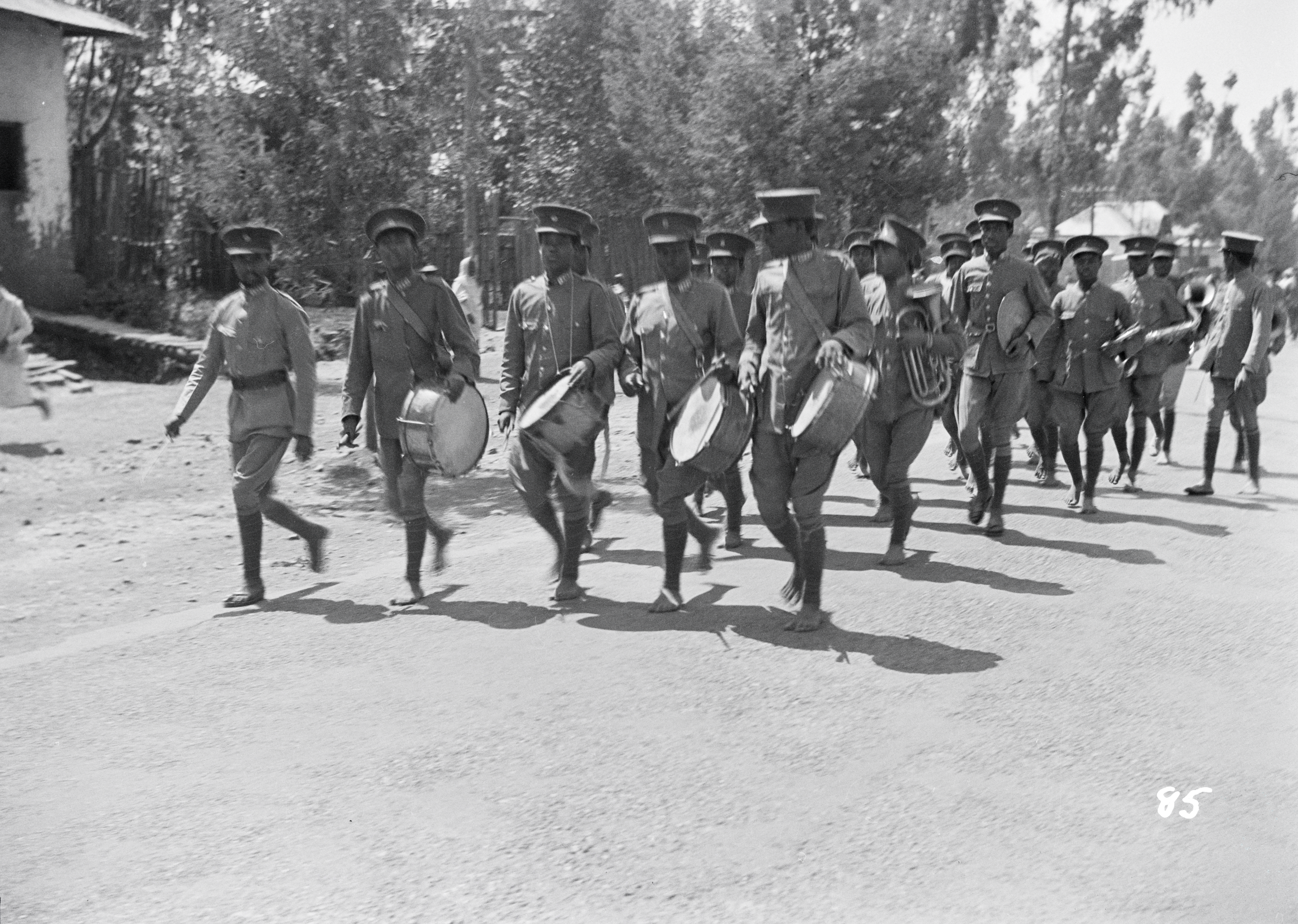
The army band parading in March 1934

- Marching Band
- Orchestra and Theatre
- Symphony Music
- Music Training

Like the Imperial Bodyguard Band, the band has trained musicians of the Ethiopian Police Band, as well as the bands of the 2nd and 3rd Army Divisions in Asmara and Harar respectively.

=== Modern era ===
The ENDF Band was established in 1934, is the premier military marching band of the country, playing a significant role in national and international ceremonial events. Initially formed with 35 musicians, the band expanded to approximately 70–80 members by 1966. Many of the band's most skilled instrumentalists were later selected to join the Defense Forces Orchestra, a professional ensemble founded within the department. It came under the direct command of the Derg in the 70s and went into its current form in 1991. It received assistance from the British Royal Corps of Army Music, most recently between 2007-2012.

== Duties ==
Since its inception, the Ground Force Band, and now the ENDF Band, has been brought out to perform music on various events, such as state visits, official holidays, and state funerals. The band has itself trained the Tigray and Somali marching bands.

== See also ==
- Military history of Ethiopia
- Music of Ethiopia
- Fanfare band
