= Azmari =

Entertainer who plays traditionel string instruments of the Ethiopian Highlands

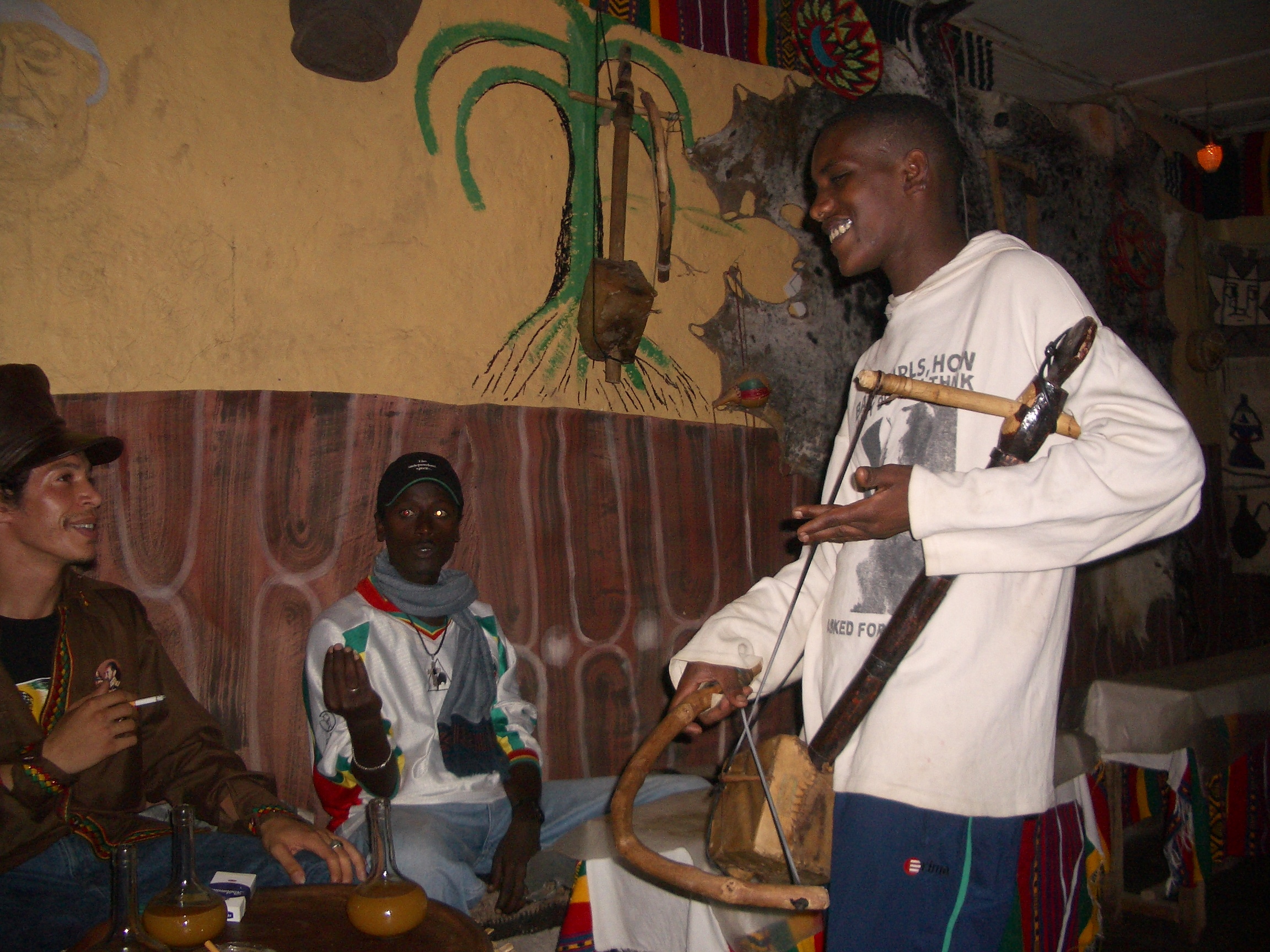
Azmari playing masenqo in a tejbeit, Lalibela, northern Ethiopia

An Azmari (Amharic: አዝማሪ) is an entertainer who sings and plays traditional string instruments. The practice comes from the Amhara Region of the Ethiopian highlands. They are comparable to medieval European minstrels, bards or West African griots.

Azmari, who may be either male or female, are skilled at singing extemporized verses, accompanying themselves on either a masenqo (one-stringed fiddle) or krar (lyre).

== Etymology ==
Azmari (Amharic: አዝማሪ) means (singer) in Amharic. Though the tradition originates in Amhara culture, as the practice became further widespread in Ethiopia, it became the primary term.

== History ==
The earliest documented mention of the Azmaris goes back to the mid-15th century, and they presumably go back much further.

=== Role in society ===
Azmaris once played an important role as social critics by improvising sophisticated texts of praise or criticism. Azmaris would mock people in high places, and even Emperors were not spared if they were found to be unpopular with the public. Azmaris were the first to convey scandals in high places.

Female Azmaris flourished in feudal Ethiopia. They were just like their male counterparts poet-musicians. The female musicians are usually wives or lovers of male Azmaris who gradually learned the repertory of their male counterparts.

Between 1841 and 1843, the English traveller Major William Cornwallis Harris captured the prevailing political atmosphere and attitudes of Sahle Selassie's court towards his enemies in a song of praise played by one of his female chorist (azmari).

In stature like the lance he bears,
His godlike mien the prince declares;
And famed for virtue through the land,
All bow to Saloo's just command.

The sabre feels the royal grasp,
And Pagans writhe in death's cold clasp;
The Galla taste the captive fare,
And dread the vengeance which they dare.

— A memorable observation by Major William Cornwallis Harris, of a female Azmari praise of king Sahle Selassie court, in " Misgana (translated from Amharic) praise song",

== Today ==
Azmaris have continued perform in various settings ranging from wedding ceremonies, to hotels, and in drinking establishments called tejbeit, which specialise in the serving of tej (mead). The Azmaris introduced the popular Tizita ballad form.

== Notable Azmari ==
- Asnaketch Worku
- Bahru Kegne
- Eténèsh Wassié
- Weres Egeziaber

== See also ==
- Ethiopian music
