= Neway Debebe =

Ethiopian singer

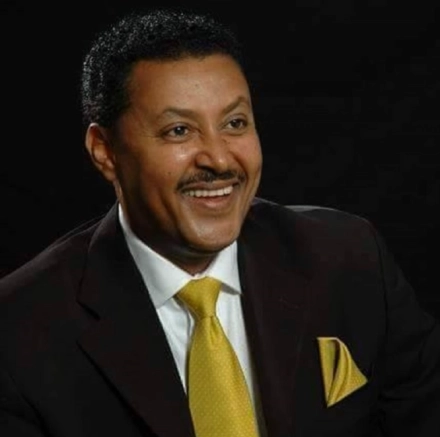

Background information
- Born: 21 December 1958 (age 67); Hamer Bako, Ethiopian Empire
- Genres: Ethiopian music; rumba; reggae; ethno jazz; calypso; Afro-pop
- Occupations: Singer; songwriter
- Instruments: Vocals
- Years active: 1977–present
- Labels: Roha Band; Langano Studio

Neway Debebe (Ge'ez: ነዋይ ደበበ; born 21 December 1958) is an Ethiopian singer. Neway became popular after releasing his first debut album, recorded by the Tango Music shop, in 1970s with a local band called the Roha Band. Following this, Neway released more than five studio albums.

== Life and career ==
=== 1958–1966: Early life ===
Neway Debebe was born in Hamer Bako, and raised in different parts of Ethiopia. He lived in Asella, Awasa and Wolaita Sodo. Neway's passion for music started while he was in high school. He attended Ras Andarge high school in Asella. The teachers supported Neway in many different ways to lay a foundation for his passion for music. As a result Neway performed well in the high school student's band.

=== 1967–1970s: Career beginnings ===
After developing his talent in high school, Neway moved to the capital Addis Ababa to further his musical career. In Addis Ababa he joined the Ambassador Theatre and the Ras Theatre's traditional band respectively. His contributions to the bands increased their popularity, especially the Ras Theatre's band.

=== 1973–1974: Maebel Naw ===
In the 1970s Neway released his first debut album Maebel Naw, which included great hit songs such as "Eshet Belahugn", "Yetikimit Abeba" and "Egnaw Enitarek". Neway has released six studio albums, and collaborated with other artists on different albums. His works have afforded him great fame with a wide audience.

Neway has been described as possessing a "voice of silk". He composes melody and lyrics for himself and for his many professional colleagues, including Tilahun Gessesse. Neway's music is wide and varied, from the traditional Ethiopian beats, rumba, reggae or garage, big band or Ethno-Jazz, calypso to Afro-pop. This made Neway hugely popular outside Ethiopia.

=== 1991–2007: Move to United States ===
In 1991, Neway went to United States and lived there for more than 16 years. Neway released his two albums "Ageren Alresam" and "Yene Deha" while in the US. These albums were arranged by Abegaz Kibrework. Henok Temesgen and Fasil Wuhib also participated. In 2007, the new Millennium in the Ethiopian calendar, Neway returned to Ethiopia.

=== 1986–2010: Marriage and divorces ===
Neway was first married to Aida Hassen. They got divorced in 2010. This was not revealed until 27 December 2020, during an interview on the talk show Seifu on EBS. The story went viral on the national level. Neway married his second spouse in 2018 and has now two sons.

== Discography ==
=== Studio albums ===
- Maebel Naw (1978)
- Telayewa (1982)
- Amen (Maebel Productions, Ethio Sound; 1995)
- Hageren Alresam (Maebel Productions, 1998)
- Best of Neway Debebe Collection (Nahom Records, 2007)
- Yetikemt Abeba (1977) EC
- Atawekiwem (1979) EC

And he have so many singles with other singers by group albums

=== Singles ===
- "Gondar" (2022)
