= Washint =

Wind instrument developed in Ethiopia

Woodwind instrument
- Classification: aerophone
- Hornbostel–Sachs classification: 421.111.12 (end blown flute)

Playing range
- unknown, usually players take 20 to 30 washints with them for performing

Washint (Amharic: ዋሽንት) is an end-blown wooden flute originally used in Ethiopia. Traditionally, Amharic musicians would pass on their oral history through song accompanied by the washint as well as the krar, which is a six stringed lyre, and the masenqo, a one string fiddle.

== Occurrence ==
Along with the Krar and the Masenqo, the Washint flute is one of the three most widespread traditional musical instruments in Ethiopia.

The washint is a favorite among the shepherds and cowherders.

== Construction and design ==
The washint can be constructed using bamboo, wood or other cane, and increasingly flutes of metal and plastic tubes can be seen. Varieties exists in different lengths and relative fingerhole placement, and a performer might use several different flutes over the course of a performance to accommodate different song types. It generally has four finger-holes, which allows the player to create a pentatonic scale.

== See also ==
- Ney, a flute of similar construction found in Middle Eastern Music
- Ney (Turkish), a Turkish flute of similar construction
- Kaval, a similar wind instrument found in Azerbaijan, Turkey, Macedonia and Bulgaria
- Music of Ethiopia - historical overview of music tradition of Ethiopia
- Krar, five or six-stranded bowl-shaped lyre used in Ethiopia and Eritrea
- Masenqo, single-stranded bowed lute in Ethiopian-Eritrean tradition.
