= Lij Michael =

Ethiopian rapper (born 1986)

- Born: 19 February 1986 (age 40); Addis Ababa, Ethiopia
- Genres: Hip-hop; trap
- Occupation: Rapper
- Years active: 2011–present
- Website: lijmichaelmusic.com

Michael Taye (Ge'ez: ሚካኤል ታዬ; born 19 February 1986), known professionally as Lij Michael, is an Ethiopian rapper. Considered as "King of Ethiopian rap", he is prominent in the Ethiopian hip hop music culture.

== Life and career ==
Michael Taye was born on 19 February 1986 in Addis Ababa, Ethiopia. He graduated from Andenet High School and pursued his diploma career in IT at Softnet College. While in college, Michael appeared in the institution to become an MC on many stages. In 2007, he released his first single called "Arada L'arada", and received over 300,000 views on YouTube in its first three months.

In November 2015, Michael released his debut album titled Zaraye Yehun Nege that consists of 15 tracks, becoming widely acclaimed album of the year. To promote the album, he began touring in Europe and collaborating with other Ethiopian artists of the time, such as Sami Dan and Bisrat Surafel. He participated in season 4 of Coke Studio Africa, and collaborated with Tanzanian Yamoto Band. He was nominated in MTV music award and AMAs for African musicians, becoming a widely acclaimed rapper. He released the second album called Atgebam Alugn in February 2021. In May 2021, Michael joined ensemble musicians Fikreaddis Nekatibeb, Kuku Sebsebe, Zeritu Kebede, Sayat Demissie and Rahel Getu for the single "Yehager Kasma". In July 2023, he released "Alew Mesenko". He released his third album titled "Addis Arada" in August 2024 on his YouTube page.

== Discography ==
- Zaraye Yehun Nege (2015)
- Atgebam Alugn (2021)
- Addis Arada (2024)
