= Aster Aweke =

Ethiopian singer (born 1959)

Aster Aweke አስቴር አወቀ
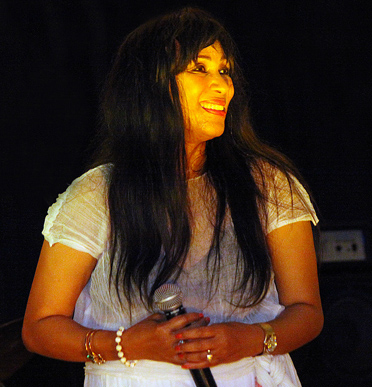
- Aster Aweke performing at a 2012 concert in Melbourne, Australia.

Background information
- Born: 1959 (age 66–67); Gondar, Begemder Province, Ethiopian Empire (now Amhara Region, Ethiopia)
- Origin: Gondar, Ethiopia
- Genres: Ethiopian music; Ethio-jazz; soul-jazz
- Instrument: Vocals
- Years active: 1970s–present
- Labels: Buda Musique; Columbia/SME; Kabu Records

Aster Aweke (Amharic: አስቴር አወቀ; born 1959) is an Ethiopian singer-songwriter. Considered "Queen of Ethiopian Pop Music", she is one of the most significant Ethiopian artists in the 20th and 21st century.

Born in Gondar province, Aster moved to Addis Ababa with her father who worked as a civil servant in the imperial government of Haile Selassie. Aster recalled that she was discouraged by her family to pursue her music ambition. She listened to songs like Tilahun Gessesse and Bizunesh Bekele, as well as American musicians like Donna Summer and Aretha Franklin. Aster has worked with numerous musical bands, performed through clubs at Addis Ababa with famous bands including Shebelle Band, Roha Band, Ibex Band and Hotel D'Afrique Band.

From 1977, she began producing her own music. In 1981, she moved to the U.S., settled in Washington D.C. Aster has worked entertaining in restaurant and clubs. Her self-titled album Aster was released by Columbia Records after a 1989 release by British independent label Triple Earth. In 1997, she returned to Ethiopia, showcasing her unique musical versatility. After founding her recording studio, Kabu Records, she released widely acclaimed albums such as Hagere (1999), Sugar (2001), Aster Ballads (2004), Fikir (2006) and Checheho (2010).

== Early life ==
Aster Aweke was born in Gondar in 1959. She moved to Addis Ababa as a child with her father, who was senior civil servant in the imperial government of Haile Selassie. Aster hails from the Gurage ethnic group.

In a 1990 interview with Amy Duncan of The Christian Science Monitor, Aster discussed how her parents disapproved of her musical ambition: "My family opposed me, but I just kept going and going... That's my life. I tried everything, but music makes me so happy."

== Career ==
Aster enjoyed listening to Ethiopian musicians like Tilahun Gessesse and Bizunesh Bekele, as well as American musicians like Donna Summer and Aretha Franklin. When she was thirteen years-old, she decided to join Hager Fikir Theatre and auditioned by singing Bizunesh's song to join the theater as a dancer and vocalist.

In her teen years, she performed through clubs at Addis Ababa with famous bands including Shebelle Band, Roha Band, Ibex Band and Hotel D'Afrique Band. Her style gradually influenced by Bizunesh Bekele and performed songs by Donna Summer and Aretha Franklin. She began as a solo career in 1977 through the release of her debut album, and followed with three more albums within the year.

In 1981, she moved to the United States. She temporarily settled in the San Francisco Bay Area of California and then within two years moved to Washington, D.C. She briefly attended Northern Virginia Community College, specializing in computer science, as well as learning formal musical education, which she took a distaste towards. During her time in the D.C. metropolitan area, she performed in restaurants and clubs. During her time in Washington, Aster released her U.S. major label debut Aster. Aster was released by Columbia Records in 1990 after a 1989 release by British independent label Triple Earth.

In 1997, after more than 15 years abroad, Aster returned to Ethiopia, where she was warmly welcomed by thousands of fans awaiting her at Addis Ababa airport.

Aster Aweke owned and operated a cafeteria in Addis Ababa called Kabu, which was named after her song "Kabu". The cafeteria ceased operations in 2015. On 3 January 2023, Aster released Soba. The album comprises a collabrative work of other artists. Three years later on 7 July 2026, she released Gela Gela with a premiere listening event at the Sheraton Addis.

== Discography ==
Albums
Title	Year	Label
Aster	1990	Triple Earth, Columbia/CBS Records
Kabu	1991	Colombia/CBS Records
Ebo	1994	Barkhanns
Live in London	1995	Barkhanns
Hagere	1999	Kabu Records
Sugar	2001	Kabu Records
Asters Ballads	2004	Kabu Records
Fikir	2006	Kabu Records
Checheho	2010	Kabu Records
Ewedhalew	2013	Kabu Records
Musica	2017	Kabu Records
Sebebu	2017	Kabu Records
Chewa	2019	Kabu Records
Soba	2023	Kabu Records
Gela Gela	2026	Kabu Records

Contributing artist

- Ethiopian Groove (1994) - The Golden Seventies (Buda Musique)
- Unwired: Acoustic Music from Around the World (1999) - (World Music Network)
- The Rough Guide to the Music of Ethiopia (2004) - (World Music Network)

Featured singles

- Taitu (2014) - Yegna
