= Munit Mesfin =

Ethiopian singer-songwriter (born 1981)

Munit Mesfin (born 1981) is an Ethiopian singer and songwriter best known for working in a duo with German vocalist and guitarist Jӧrg Pfeil. Munit sings in her mother tongue Amharic and English, with inspiration from traditional Ethiopian songs. Some of her music includes vocalization without words. Mesfin has a focus on social issues and female empowerment.

== Early life ==
Munit Mesfin was born in 1981 in Addis Ababa, Ethiopia. Her mother is Dr. Tewabech Bishaw, a public health professional and a pioneer, who was the first female public health officer in Ethiopia. Her father is Prof. Mesfin Abebe, Ethiopia's first soil scientist, who has worked his whole life for the protection of Ethiopia's natural resources, especially its soil. Both of her parents grew up in the city of Jimma, Ethiopia.

Munit moved to India at the age of ten because of her mother's work with UNICEF. She moved to Windhoek, Namibia, at fourteen, where she completed her GCE Ordinary Levels. At sixteen, she moved to the United States, where she attended Northfield Mount Hermon School in Northfield, Massachusetts. She went on to study economics and government at Smith College, a private women's liberal arts college in Northampton, Massachusetts. During her youth, Munit performed with various local choirs. While at Smith, Mesfin performed with the college's a capella group, the Smiffenpoofs.

== Musical career ==
While living in Washington, D.C. after college, Munit was a backup singer for Ethiopian-American soul singer Wayna. She worked with many other Ethiopian musicians, including her brother, Jorga Mesfin, an Ethio-jazz saxophonist. After living abroad for almost 20 years, Munit returned to Ethiopia in 2007 during the celebration of the Ethiopian Millennium, where she met her frequent collaborator, Jörg Pfeil.

Since then, the pair have released two albums as Munit and Jӧrg: Just the two of us: Live at the coffee house, in 2008, and ፪ ። 2, released in March 2013.

== Personal life ==
Munit Mesfin is married and has three children.
