= Ambassel scale =

Pentatonic scale used in Gonder and Wollo Province in Ethiopia

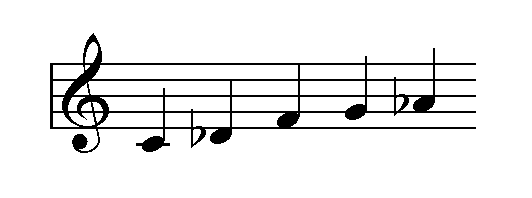
The Ambassel scale

The Ambassel scale (Amharic: አምባሰል ቅኝት) is a pentatonic scale widely used in the Gonder and Wollo regions of Ethiopia.

The notes of the scale (from C) are C, Db, F, G and Ab. It can be viewed as a pentatonic subset of the Phrygian scale on intervals 1, ♭2, 4, 5, ♭6 or as a mode of the Hirajoshi scale.

The scale is used in Ethiopian music for songs with historical themes. It can be heard used on the song "Ambassel" by Abate Berihun and Yitzhak Yedid on their Duo Ras Dashen album.

== See also ==
- Music of Ethiopia
