= Teddy Yo =

Ethiopian rapper

- Born: Tewodros Assefa
- Genres: Hip-hop
- Occupation: Rapper
- Instrument: Vocals
- Years active: 2000s–present
- Labels: Hope Music Entertainment; Nahom Records
- Formerly of: Gamo Boys

Tewodros Assefa (Amharic: ቴዎድሮስ አሰፋ), known professionally Teddy Yo, is an Ethiopian rapper regarded as the greatest rapper in Ethiopian hip hop music culture. His single "Gurage Tone", which was released in 2007, became a signature song and popularized him to the hip hop music industry.

== Life and career ==
Tewodros Assefa started his career in the 2000s in a musical group Gamo Boys, before quickly establishing himself as a solo singer. From then, he adapted "Teddy Yo" as his stage name. In 2007, he released his breakthrough single titled "Gurage Tone", becoming a major success in the music industry. In 2018, he released Prisoner, referring to "prisoner of culture" in hip-hop context. The album has 18 tracks with different beats. His single "Africa" from the 2018 album Arada, Vol. 2 described as "upbeat, feel-good song about Africa’s culture, struggles, and beauty" The album also features celebrities like the Jungle Crew and reggae star Jah Lud. Assefa is signed to Hope Music Ethiopia and Nahom Records.

On 31 December 2022, Tewodros was detained for a night after his controversial single "Menberish" ("Your throne") came out, which was critical of the government, denounced the living conditions and the government negligence to residents in Addis Ababa. In the music video, he is seen in jail in harsh conditions while depicting Addis Ababa residents. On 5 January 2024, he released Yileyal.

== Selected discography ==
- Demese Albaw Mesarya (2006)
- Arada (2018)
- Yileyal (2024)
