= Tizita =

Balladic musical style in Ethiopian and Eritrean tradition

Tizita (var. Tezeta; Amharic: ትዝታ; English: memory, "nostalgia" or "longing") is one of the Pentatonic scales or Qenet of the Amhara ethnic group.

== Etymology and origin ==
The term tizita is distinctly Tigrinya, and Amharic, there's no Ge'ez equivalent, as opposed to the term nafkot which belongs to both languages with the same meaning (regret, emotion linked to a remembrance). Tizita folk songs developed in the countryside by the Amhara peasantry and the village musicians called the Azmaris.

== Tizita music genre ==
Tizita songs are a popular music genre in Ethiopia and Eritrea. It's named after the Tizita Qañat mode/scale used in such songs. Tizita is known for strongly moving listener's feelings not only among the Amhara, but a large number of Ethiopians, in general.

Western sources often compare tizita to the blues. Other musical equivalent are the Portuguese Saudade, Assouf for the Tuareg people, or Dor in Romania. In Slovakia, the closest word is clivota or cnenie, Sehnsucht in German, and "կարոտ" (phonetically karōt) in Armenian.

Modern Ethiopian artists who have performed tizita songs include Aster Aweke, Hailu Mergia, Bezawork Asfaw, Teddy Afro, Mulatu Astatke, Meklit Hadero, Seyfu Yohannes and Mahmoud Ahmed.

=== Ethio-Jazz ===
Ethiopian Jazz or Ethio-Jazz genre was developed in the 1960's by infusing Tizita Qañat with elements of Ethiopian Orthodox Christian music, and the use of Western instruments. The pioneer of this genre is Mulatu Astatke.

== See also ==
- Music of Ethiopia
