= Masenqo =

String musical instrument from Ethiopia

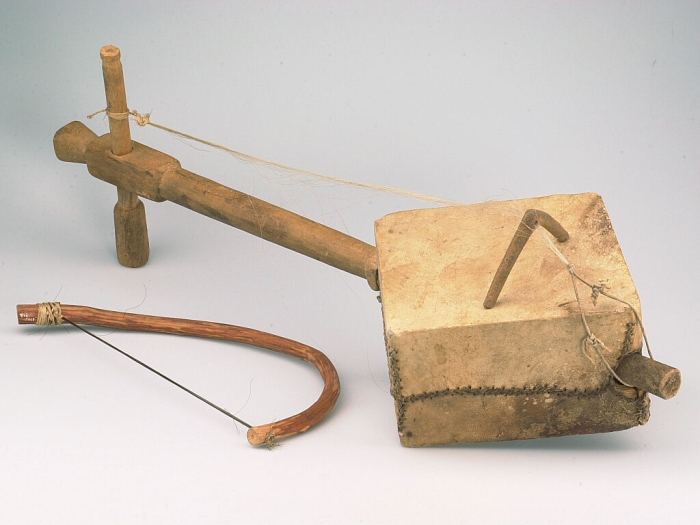
- A traditional Ethiopian masinko or chira-wata

String instrument
- Classification: chordophone
- Hornbostel–Sachs classification: 321.311 (spike bowed lute)

Related instruments
- gusle (Dinaric Alps); igil (Tuvan); krar (Horn of Africa)

The masenqo (Amharic: ማሲንቆ; Tigrinya: ጭራ-ዋጣ (ዋጣ), also known as masinko or mesenko, is a single-stringed bowed lute commonly found in the musical traditions of Eritrea and Ethiopia. As with the krar, this instrument is used by Ethiopian minstrels called azmaris ("singer" in Amharic). Although it functions in a purely accompaniment capacity in songs, the masenqo requires considerable virtuosity, as azmaris accompany themselves while singing.

== Construction and design ==
The square or diamond-shaped resonator is made of four small wooden boards glued together, then covered with a stretched parchment or rawhide. The single string is typically made of horse hair, and passes over a bridge. The instrument is tuned by means of a large tuning peg to fit the range of the singer's voice. It may be bowed by either the right or left hand, and the non-bow hand sits lightly on top of the upper part of the string.

== See also ==
- Music of Eritrea
- Music of Ethiopia
- Rebab
