= Music of Ethiopia =

Ethiopian music
- Cultural origins: Ethiopia
- Typical instruments: Krar; masenqo; saxophone; washint; begena

Subgenres
- Zema (Christian Liturgical Chant); Ethio-jazz

Regional scenes
- Amhara Region; Tigray Region; Addis Ababa

Local scenes
- Begmeder; Shewa; Gojjam; Wello

Other topics
- Music of Eritrea

Ethiopian music is a term that can mean any music of Ethiopian origin, however, often it is applied to a genre, a distinct modal system that is pentatonic, with characteristically long intervals between some notes.

The music of the Ethiopian Highlands uses a fundamental modal system called qenet, of which there are four main modes: tezeta, bati, ambassel, and anchihoy. Three additional modes are variations on the above: tezeta minor, bati major, and bati minor. Some songs take the name of their qenet, such as tizita, a song of reminiscence. When played on traditional instruments, these modes are generally not tempered (that is, the pitches may deviate slightly from the Western-tempered tuning system), but when played on Western instruments such as pianos and guitars, they are played using the Western-tempered tuning system.

Music in the Ethiopian highlands is generally monophonic or heterophonic. In certain southern areas, some music is polyphonic. Dorze polyphonic singing (edho) may employ up to five parts; Majangir, four parts.

== Musical instruments ==
=== Chordophones ===
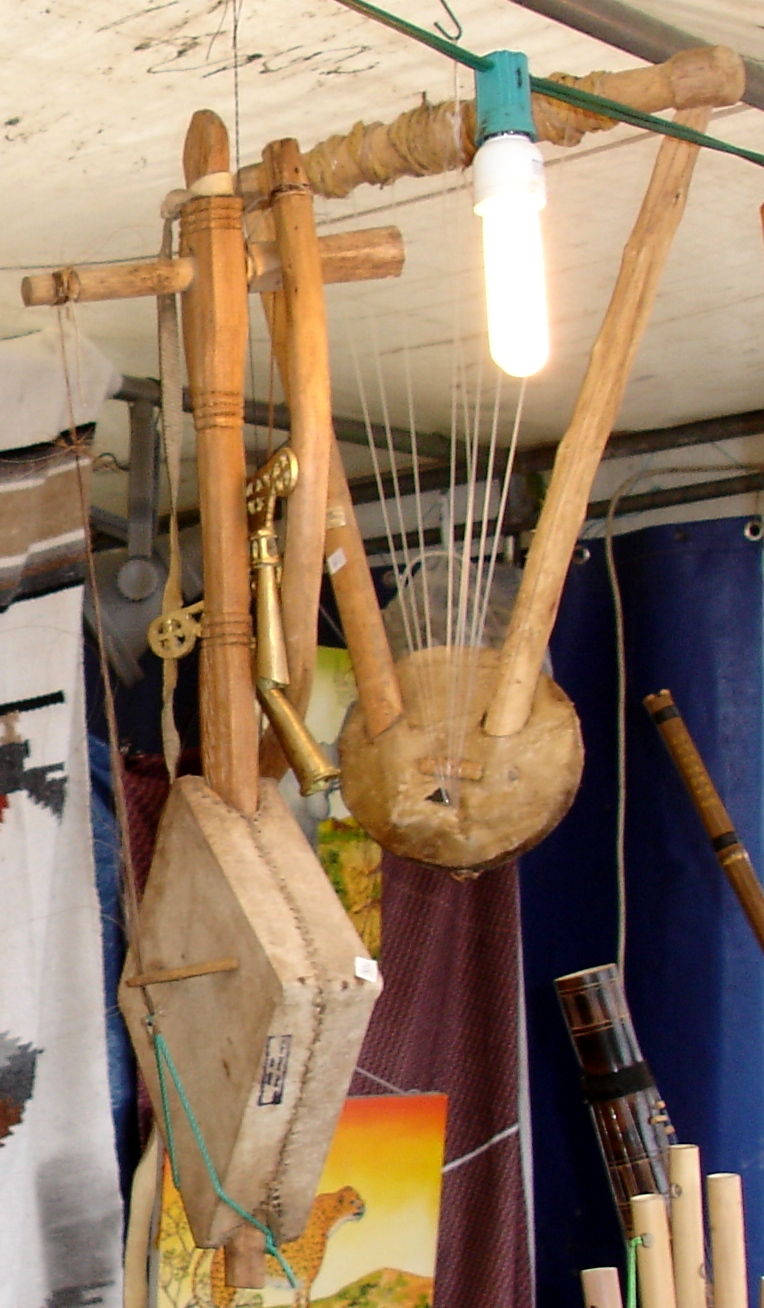
Masenqo (left) and Krar (right)

In the highlands, traditional string instruments include the masenqo (also known as masinko), a one-string bowed lute; the krar (also known as kirar), a six-string lyre; and the begena, a large ten-string lyre. The dita (a five-string lyre) and musical bows (including an unusual three-string variant) are among the chordophones found in the south.

=== Aerophones ===
The washint is a bamboo flute that is common in the highlands. Trumpet-like instruments include the ceremonial malakat used in some regions, and the holdudwa (animal horn; compare shofar) found mainly in the south. Embilta flutes have no finger holes, and produce only two tones, the fundamental and a fourth or fifth interval. These may be metal (generally found in the north) or bamboo (in the south). The Konso and other people in the south play fanta, or pan flutes. It has 6 holes.

=== Idiophones ===
In the Ethiopian Orthodox Church, liturgical music employs the senasel (a sistrum). Additionally, the clergy will use walking stick, called mequamia, to maintain rhythm. Rural churches historically used a dawal to call the faithful to prayer. They are made from stone slabs or pieces of wood. The Beta Israel use a small gong called a qachel as liturgical accompaniment, though qachel may also refer to a small bell. The toom, a lamellophone, is used among the Nuer, Anuak, Majangir, Surma, and other Nilotic groups. Metal leg rattles are common throughout the south.

=== Membranophones ===
The kebero is a large hand drum used in the Orthodox Christian liturgy. Smaller kebero drums may be used in secular celebrations. The nagarit, played with a curved stick, is usually found in a secular context such as royal functions or the announcement of proclamations, though it has a liturgical function among the Beta Israel. The Gurage and certain other populations in the lowlands commonly play the atamo, a small hand drum sometimes made of clay. In Gambela Region, the Anuak specify three different kinds of drums: the anedo (small drum), the odola (medium drum), and the bul (big drum), with different rhythmic patterns attached to certain song genres. There is a special kind of drum referred to as tom-tom that is used in the southwestern part of the country, in Gambella Region. The beating of drums in general is very characteristic of the fast songs played in the south of the country, where you have the Kenbata, Hadiya, Gedeo, Sidama, and others performing their colorful, traditional belly dances that are reminiscent of the Middle Eastern or Arabic dancers.

== Traditional music and characteristics ==
Ethiopia and its folk music are seen as essential to its culture. The music of Ethiopia is a reflection of multiple historical and social episodes, such as war, patriotism, songs of victory, and songs that incite support for a certain crusade. The music can also be about love, with a focus on more romantic prose. The spirituality of Ethiopians is also expressed in their music. All these types of tunes and melodies are prepared and performed using various traditional instruments.

Music in the country can be traced back to the Ethiopian highlands, where the strong oral-literary custom was born. In this area, traditional music is played by mostly itinerant musicians called azmaris, who are regarded with respect in their society. As this form of music slowly spread across the country, it appropriated aspects of the regions it infiltrated, depending on the local customs, culture, and religion. The music and culture of Ethiopia has been influenced by Christianity, Islam, and Judaism among other factors. Ethiopia has a diverse number of ethnic groups, more than 75 ethnic groups with each ethnic group having diverse traditional music and sounds.

== Characteristics of the traditional music ==
Music from the highlands of Ethiopia has a modal system called qenet which consists of four main modes; tezeta, bati, ambassel, and anchihoy. It also consists of three additional modes; tezeta minor, bati major, and bati minor. • Pentatonic Scales: Ethiopian music has a pentatonic modal system with long intervals between notes contributing to the distinctive nature of the music.

Complex rhythms: Ethiopian music is known for its intricate rhythmic patterns, as with the case for many African music, often featuring irregular meters and syncopation.

Vocal styles: Traditional Ethiopian singing includes a variety of vocal techniques, such as melismatic, ornamentation, vocal slides, and call-and-response structures. In terms of instruments, Ethiopian music incorporates a wide variety of instruments. These instruments include the masinko, the krar, the washint, the begena, the kebero, and the tom-tom.

Regional variations: Different regions of Ethiopia have their distinct musical styles since it has more than 75 ethnic groups with each ethnic group having diverse traditional music and sounds.

Cultural significance: Music holds deep cultural and social significance in Ethiopia, often accompanying religious ceremonies, cultural festivals, and social gatherings. Stimulating and expressing emotion in the performers, and imparting it to the listeners. This is a key trait of the Ethiopian traditional music. The emotion may be religious exaltation, as in the creation chant and a sacred song; grief, as in the laments; longing or passion, as in the love song.

== Traditional dances ==
The various tribes and ethnic groups of Ethiopia have their distinct music, cultures, and traditions. According to some analysts, Ethiopian dances are not divided according to their function but rather according to their uniqueness and individuality. Therefore, there are over 150 unique dance movements across Ethiopia. Oromia region is the largest and their dance styles are different depending on place. Some of the famous dances are “Shewa Oromo” and “Harar Oromo”. Especially, Shewa Oromo dance has unique costumes as well as steps. Women wear leather-made wild two-piece costumes decorated with shells. Men wear fur skin like a lion’s mane on the head and use sticks for dance. What is most surprising is women’s very fast and sharp neck motion. For example, the Tigrayans to the north have a smooth, circular dance routine characterized by shoulder and neck movements. It's known for its unique emphasis on intense shoulder movement which it shares with the shim-shim dance of the Tigrinya people in neighboring Eritrea. The Amharas at the center of the country have a dance style dominated by upper body and neck movements. The Oromos at the center and south have a jumping style and full-bodied dance routine. The Gurages have an acrobatic dance that requires high levels of arm, leg, and body coordination. The Welayita, Kenbata, Sidama, Dawro, and others among the peoples of the South Region have very attractive belly dances that are hugely popular throughout the nation. The beats are quite rhythmic and fast. Eskista is a traditional Ethiopian cultural dance from the Amhara ethnic group performed by men, women, and children. The dance is characterized by rolling and bouncing the shoulders, jilting the chest, and thrusting the neck in various directions. Motives and characteristics of the dance often vary according to the performers and the context, for example, war songs, hunting songs, shepherd songs, love songs, and work songs. The best dancer is typically appointed as the leader of the group and/or the best singer. Eskista dance brings the dancer into a role as a storyteller, who then expresses with his or her body the cultural traditions and life of the community. The dance, as well as the music and singing, serve as symbolic messages of Ethiopian society as a whole.

== Religious and secular music ==
Religious music is very important and plays significant role to Ethiopian Orthodox society. The term mezmur is instinctively denotes an Ethiopian Orthodox Tewahedo music. There are also wide range of Islamic music. Protestant music also plays a dominant role since booming its distribution via CDs in 2000s, and recently it evolves from digital downloads.

Some Ethiopian religious music has an ancient Christian element, traced to Yared, who lived during the reign of Emperor Gebre Meskel (Son of Kaleb of Aksumite Empire) in the 6th century. Yared was considered the father of Ethiopian-Eritrean traditional music as well as he composed chant or Zema and the use in liturgical music. Zema is divided into three chant modes: Ge'ez, Ezel and Araray. Manzuma, which developed around 1907, is sung in Amharic and Oromo most notably in Dire Dawa, Harar and Jimma where Ethiopian Muslims reside. In the Ethiopian Highlands, traditional secular music is played by mostly itinerant musicians called azmaris, who are regarded with respect in Ethiopian society.

== Role of digital streaming ==
Since the 2010s, Ethiopia’s music industry has undergone significant transformation with the rise of digital platforms such as YouTube and Spotify. Contemporary musicians like Teddy Afro, Betty G, and Rophnan have introduced modern interpretations of traditional sounds, blending Ethio-jazz, hip hop, and electronic influences. This digital shift has expanded Ethiopian music’s global reach and provided new opportunities for artists to engage with diaspora audiences.

== Popular music ==
Ethiopia is a musically traditional country. Popular music is played, recorded and listened to, but most musicians also sing traditional songs, and most audiences choose to listen to both popular and traditional styles. A long-standing popular musical tradition in Ethiopia was that of brass bands, imported from Jerusalem in the form of forty Armenian orphans (Arba Lijoch) during the reign of Haile Selassie. This band, which arrived in Addis Ababa on 6 September 1924, became the first official orchestra of Ethiopia. By the end of World War II, large orchestras accompanied singers; the most prominent orchestras were the Army Band, Police Band, and Imperial Bodyguard Band.

From the 1950s to the 1970s, Ethiopian popular musicians included Mahmoud Ahmed, Alemayehu Eshete, Hirut Bekele, Ali Birra, Ayalew Mesfin, Kiros Alemayehu, Muluken Melesse and Tilahun Gessesse, while popular folk musicians included Alemu Aga, Kassa Tessema, Ketema Makonnen, Asnaketch Worku, and Mary Armede. Perhaps the most influential musician of the period, however, was Ethio-jazz innovator Mulatu Astatke. Amha Records, Kaifa Records, and Philips-Ethiopia were prominent Ethiopian record labels during this era. Since 1997, Buda Musique's Éthiopiques series has compiled many of these singles and albums on compact disc.

During the 1980s, the Derg controlled Ethiopia, and emigration became almost impossible. Musicians during this period included Ethio Stars, Walias Band and Roha Band, though the singer Neway Debebe was most popular. He helped to popularize the use of seminna-werq (wax and gold, a poetic form of double entendre) in music (previously only used in qiné, or poetry) that often enabled singers to criticize the government without upsetting the censors. Soldier songs such as Zeraf poetry, Fukera, Shilela, and Kererto were the first recorded instances of the Amharic language during the medieval period and remain an important part of Amhara culture to this day.

=== Contemporary scene ===
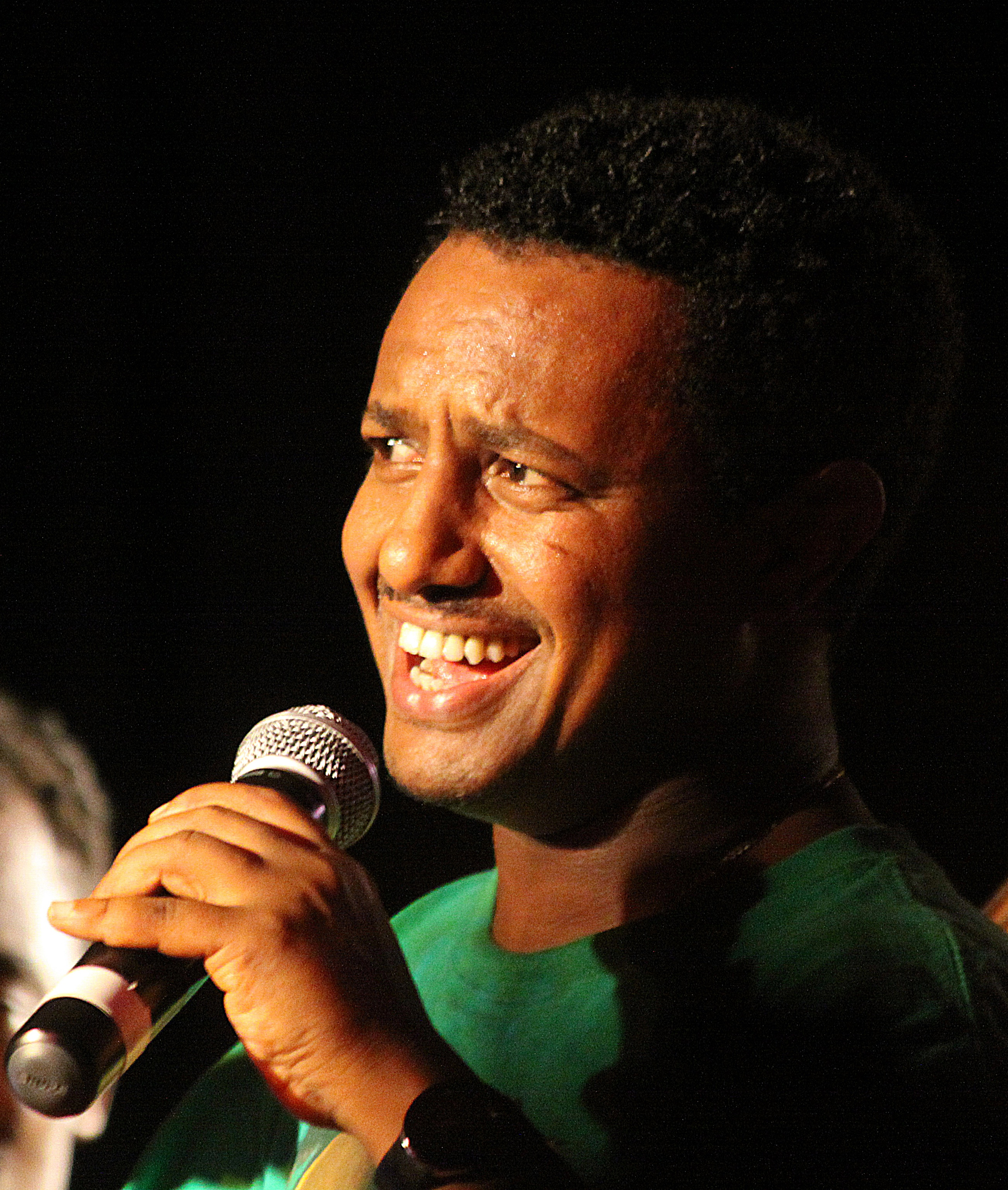
Teddy Afro singing at a concert in June 2011

The most prominent internationally acclaimed Ethiopian singers are Aster Aweke, Alemayehu Eshete, Gigi, Teddy Afro, Tilahun Gessesse and Mahmoud Ahmed. Tilahun Gessesse was popular through 20th-century and nicknamed "The Voice" due to his prolong tenor vocal. In 2001, Teddy Afro debut his album Abugida and quickly become famous singer in his generation, nicknamed "Blatenaw" (English: The boy). Some commentators also compare Teddy Afro with Tilahun Gessesse by musical style and patriotic sentiments. Through her performing with prominent Western jazz musicians such as Bill Laswell (who is also her husband) and Herbie Hancock, Gigi has brought Ethiopian music to popular attention, especially in the United States, where she now lives. Through her 1999 album Hagere and "Abebayehosh", Aster Aweke is renowned for her voice that attracted broader audience.

Another noteworthy singer is Neway Debebe, who was very popular among the youth of the 1980s and early 1990s with such songs as "Yetekemt Abeba," "Metekatun Ateye," "Safsaf," and "Gedam" – among others. Abatte Barihun has exemplified all four main qenets on his 2005 album Ras Deshen.

Éthiopiques producer Francis Falceto criticizes contemporary Ethiopian music for eschewing traditional instruments and ensemble playing in favor of one-man bands using synthesizers. Harvard University professor Kay Kaufman Shelemay, on the other hand, maintains that there is genuine creativity in the contemporary music scene. She further points out that Ethiopian music is not alone in shifting to electronically produced music, a point that Falceto acknowledges.

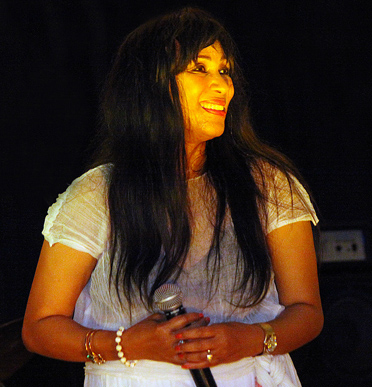
Aster Aweke in 2012 concert tour

In the West, several bands were also created in recent years to play music inspired by the Éthiopiques series and other examples of Ethiopian music of the '60s and '70s. They include Boston's Either/Orchestra, Imperial Tiger Orchestra (Switzerland), and Le Tigre des platanes (France).

New genres of music, popular in western countries, such as EDM, rock and hip hop have been introduced in recent years. Musical acts like Jano Band play a new style of music progressive rock, with a mix of Ethiopian music. Hip hop music started influencing Ethiopian music in the early to mid 2000s and culminated with the creation of Ethiopian hip hop, rhymed in the native Amharic language. The earliest and most influential rappers of the hip hop were Teddy Yo and Lij Michael, with the latter being more commercially successful. The success of both Jano Band and Lij Michael led to their inclusion in the 2017 edition of Coke Studio Africa. The electronic dance music in Ethiopia was not fully developed until mid-2010, although some electronic music employment with hip hop element began in the 2000s. In 2018, a DJ and recording artist named Rophnan introduced the country to his own version of electronic dance music, winning the album of the year award and changing the mainstream music scene further. Along with the Ethiopian diaspora, western artists such as JID, Billy Woods (Aethiopes), and Yves Tumor (Bekelé Berhanu) have also taken influence from the nations music. Global superstar the Weeknd (Abel Tesfaye), born in Canada to Ethiopian parents from the Amhara ethnicity, would later go on to be one of the world's best-selling music artists.

=== Record labels ===
Since 2016, the most used record label is Hope Music Entertainment, while Minew Shewa Entertainment and Admas Music are used as secondary labels. Hope Music Entertainment, Minew Shewa Entertainment and Dire Tube become the country's online streaming media in recent years. Dire Tube typically recovers older recordings and music videos. The most notable label throughout the 2000s is Nahom Records Inc., which is still active.

Since 2020s, labels like Ella Records and Bahgna TV become more popular.

== See also ==
- Music and politics in Ethiopia
- Qene
