= Krar =

String musical instrument from Ethiopia and Eritrea

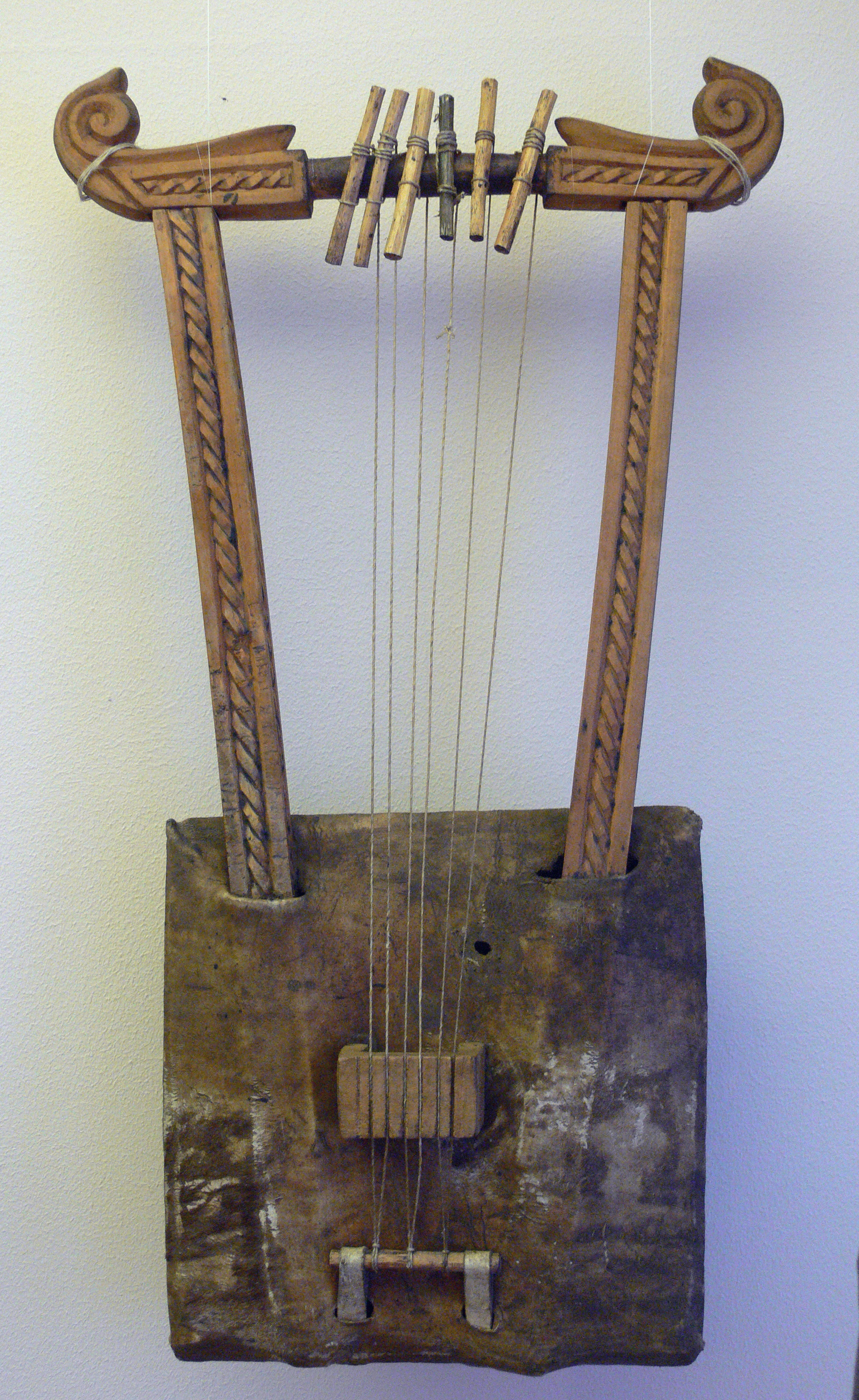
- A wooden krar.

String instrument
- Classification: lyre
- Developed: Ethiopia and Eritrea

Related instruments
- masenqo

The krar (Geʽez: ክራር) is a five-or-six stringed bowl-shaped lyre from Ethiopia and Eritrea. It is tuned to a pentatonic scale. A modern krar may be amplified, much in the same way as an electric guitar or violin. The krar, along with the masenqo and the washint, is one of the most widespread musical instruments in Northern Ethiopia and Eritrea.

== Role in society ==
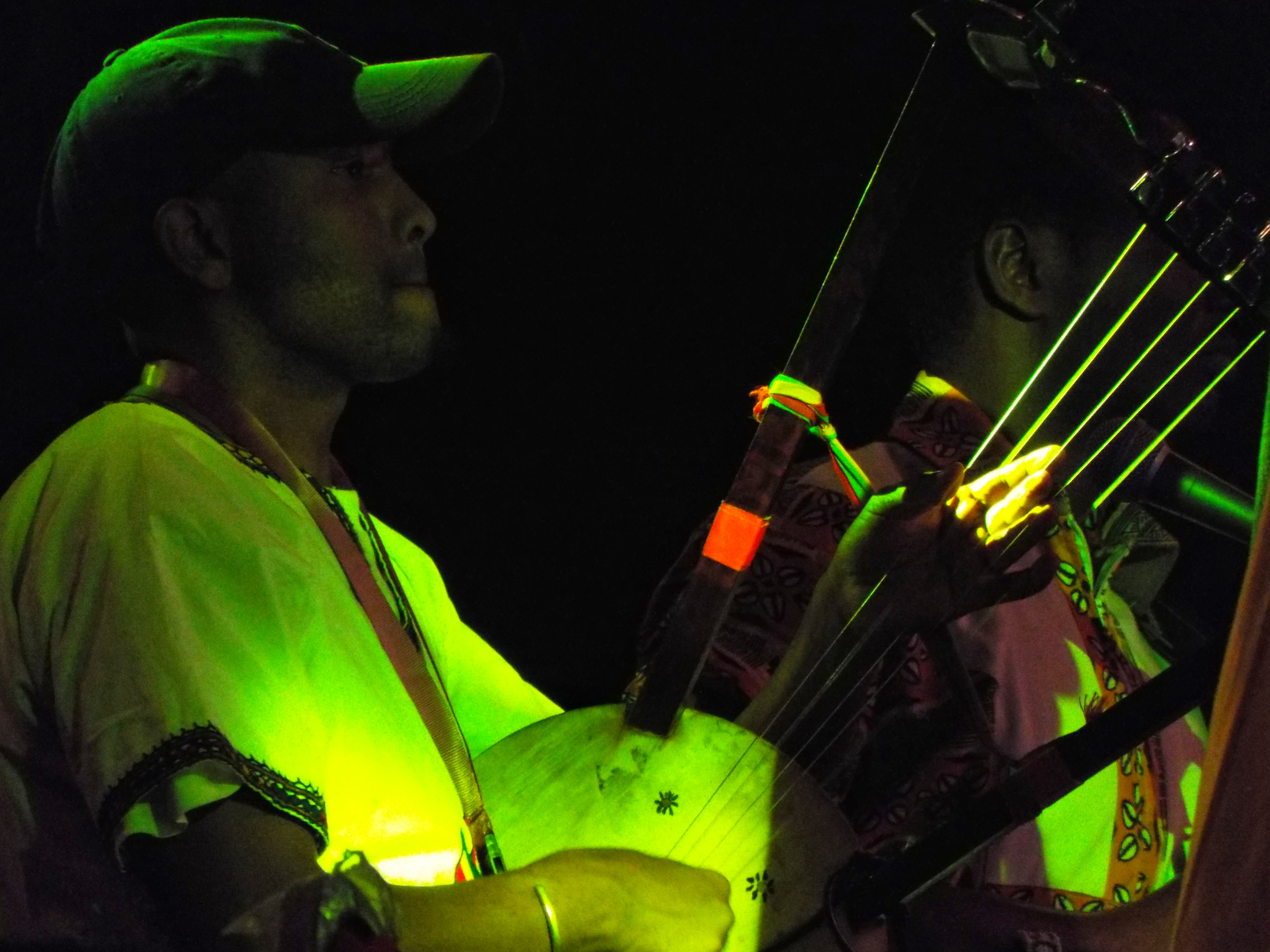
An Ethiopian musician performing in 2013

=== Historical ===
In Amhara society, the krar was viewed as an instrument inspired by the Devil and was therefore inferior, whereas the Begena was for praising God and seen as sacred. The krar was used to adulate feminine beauty, create sexual arousal, and eulogize carnal love.

The Derg regime banned playing the krar and imprisoned people who played it, especially in the big cities such as Asmara and Addis Ababa. The instrument has been associated with brigands, outlaws, and Wata or Azmari wanderers. Wanderers played the krar to solicit food, and outlaws played it to sing an Amhara war song called Fano.

=== Contemporary ===
Today, the krar which used to be the plaything of the Eritrean, has become one of the most popular Eritrean stringed instruments.

The krar is used in secular music, love songs, and poetry. It is popular among poet-musicians called Azmari or Wata.

== Features ==
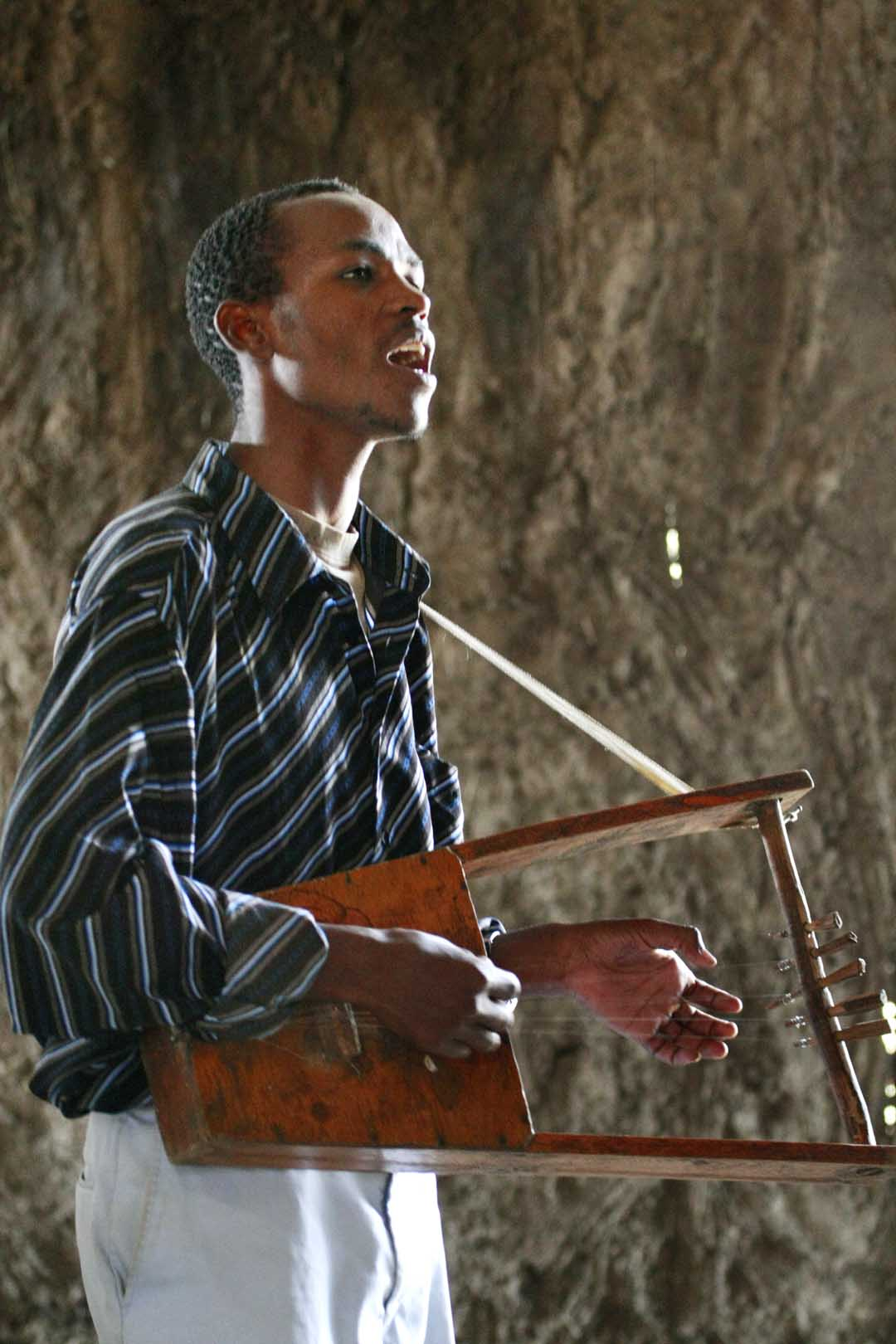
A krar player from Ethiopia

A chordophone, the krar is usually decorated with wood, cloth and beads. Its five or six strings determine the available pitches. The instrument's tone depends on the musician's playing technique: bowing, strumming, or plucking. If plucked, the instrument will produce a soft tone. Strumming, on the other hand, will yield a harmonious pulsation.

== Resources ==
- Asnakech Worku, Ethiopiques 16: The Lady with the Krar (compact disc). Buda Musique 822652, 2003.
- Ethiopie, chants d'amour (Ethiopia, Love Songs). Fantahun Shewankochew, vocals and krar (compact disc). INEDIT/Maison des Cultures du Monde W260080, 1998.

== Films ==
- HELP! – Musikalische Geschichten aus Äthiopien. Directed by Daniel Schulz.

== See also ==
- Begena
