= Jan and Antonina Żabiński =

Jan and Antonina Żabiński can refer to:

- Jan Żabiński
- Antonina Żabińska
