= Antonina Żabińska =

Polish writer, Righteous Among the Nations (1908–1971)

Antonina Maria Żabińska, née Erdman (18 July 1908 – 19 March 1971), was a Polish writer connected, through her husband Jan Żabiński, with the Warsaw Zoo. Together they smuggled out Jews from the Warsaw Ghetto. Her story was popularized through the 2007 book, The Zookeeper's Wife.

== Biography ==
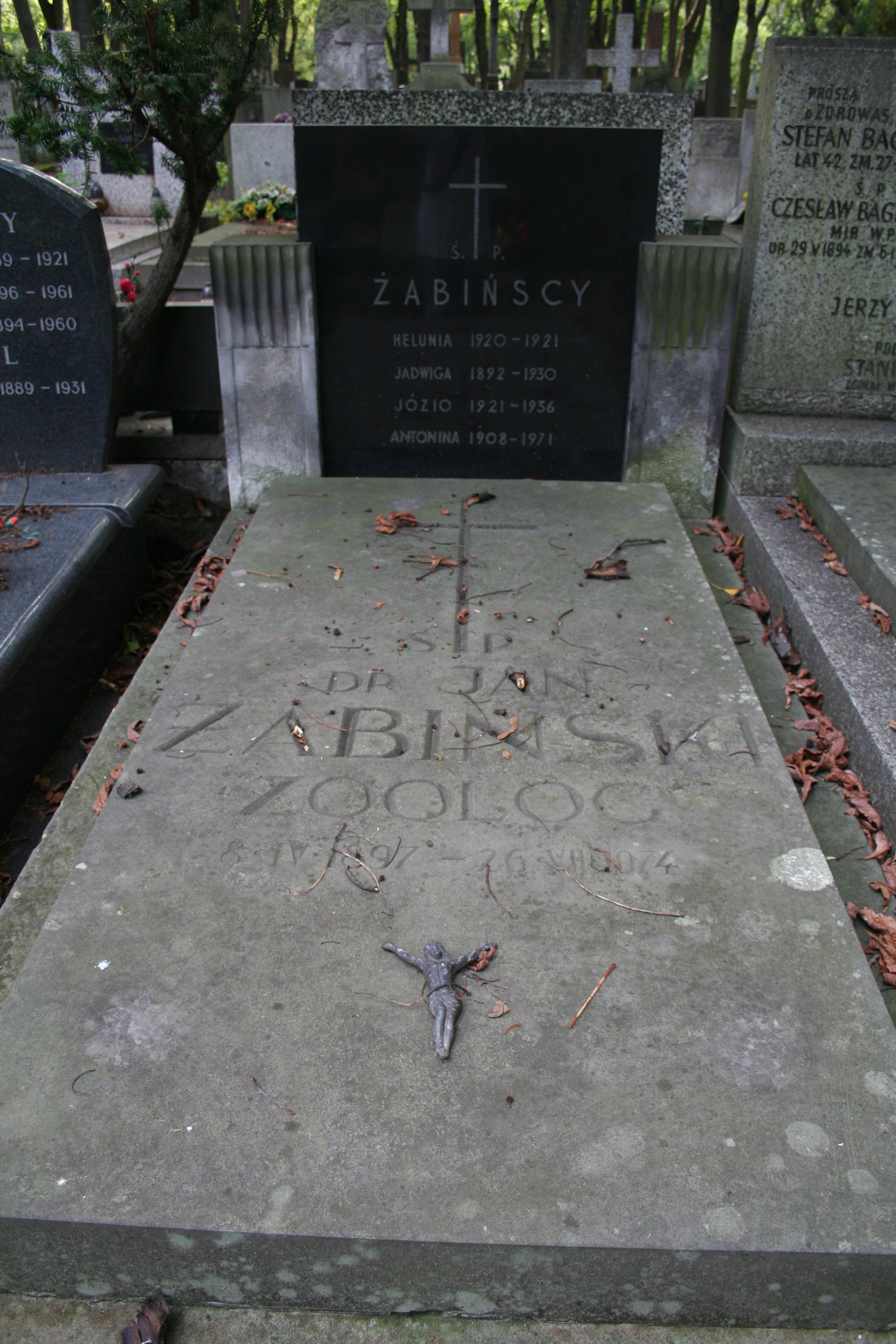
Żabiński family tomb at historic Powązki Cemetery, Warsaw

Antonina Żabińska's literary debut was a short story, "Pamiętnik żyrafy" ("Memoirs of a Giraffe"), in Moje pisemko (My Magazine, 1934). Another story, "Jak białowieskie rysice zostały Warszawiankami" ("How Female Lynxes from the Białowieża Forest Became Warsaw Residents") appeared in 1936 as the first part of an "Opowieści przyrodnicze" ("Nature Tales") series. 1939 saw her first book, Dżolly i S-ka (Jolly and Company), with a postwar re-edition subtitled "Z dziejów Warszawskiego Ogrodu Zoologicznego" ("From the History of the Warsaw Zoo").

=== Life under Nazi Occupation ===
Following the German takeover of Warsaw in September 1939, Antonina's husband, Jan, was a Zoo director, was appointed by the new Nazi administration as the superintendent of the public parks as well. An employee of the Warsaw municipality, he was therefore allowed to enter the Warsaw Ghetto officially, when the ghetto was founded in 1940. Antonina and Jan began helping their many Jewish friends right away. Availing himself of the opportunity to visit the Warsaw ghetto ostensibly to inspect the state of the flora within the ghetto walls. Among the many Jews saved were sculptor Magdalena Gross with her husband Maurycy Paweł Fraenkel, writer Rachela Auerbach, Regina and Samuel Kenigswein with children, Eugenia Sylkes, Marceli Lewi-Łebkowski with family, Marysia Aszerówna, the Keller family, Professor Ludwik Hirszfeld as well as Leonia and Irena Tenenbaum, wife and daughter of entomologist Szymon Tenenbaum (who died in the Ghetto), as well as numerous others; most of whom survived the Holocaust and nominated them for the Righteous Award years later.

During the German air assault on Warsaw in September 1939, many animal enclosures had been emptied and the zoo specimens taken elsewhere. The Żabińskis decided to utilize the clean pens, cages, and stalls as the hiding places for fleeing Jews. Over the course of three years, hundreds of Jews found temporary shelter in these abandoned cages on the eastern bank of the Vistula River until finding refuge elsewhere. In addition, close to a dozen Jews were sheltered in the Żabiński's two-story private home on the zoo's grounds. In this dangerous undertaking they were helped by their young son, Ryszard, who nourished and looked after the needs of the many distraught Jews in their care. At first, Jan paid from his own funds to subsidize the maintenance costs; then money was received through Żegota: Council to Aid Jews.

=== Post war life ===
After the war, Żabińska's children's books, "Rysice" (Lynxes, 1948) and "Borsunio" (Badger, 1964) were published. In 1968 she released a diary, Ludzie i zwierzęta (People and Animals), with recollections of her activities during the World War II occupation. 1970 saw her last book, Nasz dom w zoo (Our House in the Zoo), about the Warsaw Zoo.

She was buried at the historic Powązki Cemetery in Warsaw.

== Legacy ==
For their support of Jews during World War II Antonina and her husband received the Righteous Among the Nations award in 1965. On October 30, 1968 a tree planting ceremony was held at Yad Vashem honoring them.

In 2007 Diane Ackerman made Antonina and Jan the main characters of her book The Zookeeper's Wife, based on the diary, Ludzie i zwierzęta (People and Animals).

In 2008 Antonina Żabińska was posthumously honored with the Commander's Cross of the Order of Polonia Restituta.

A war drama about the Żabiński couple based on the book by Ackerman, The Zookeeper's Wife, was filmed in 2015 and released on March 31, 2017, with American actress Jessica Chastain portraying Antonina and Belgian actor Johan Heldenbergh cast as Jan.

== See also ==
- List of Polish writers
- List of Polish Righteous Among the Nations
