= Szymon Tenenbaum =

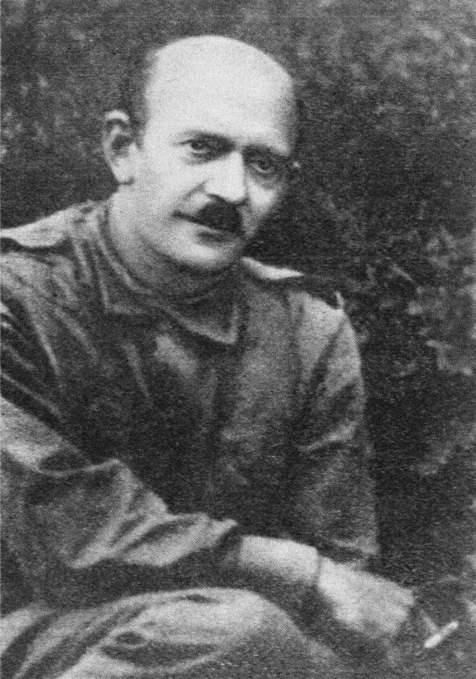

Szymon Tenenbaum (31 January 1892 – 28 November 1941) was a Polish zoologist and entomologist from Warsaw. He died of starvation and exhaustion under home arrest in the Warsaw Ghetto during the German invasion of Poland. His vast collections of insects were saved during the second world war by Antonina and Jan Żabiński at the Warsaw Zoo.

== Life and work ==
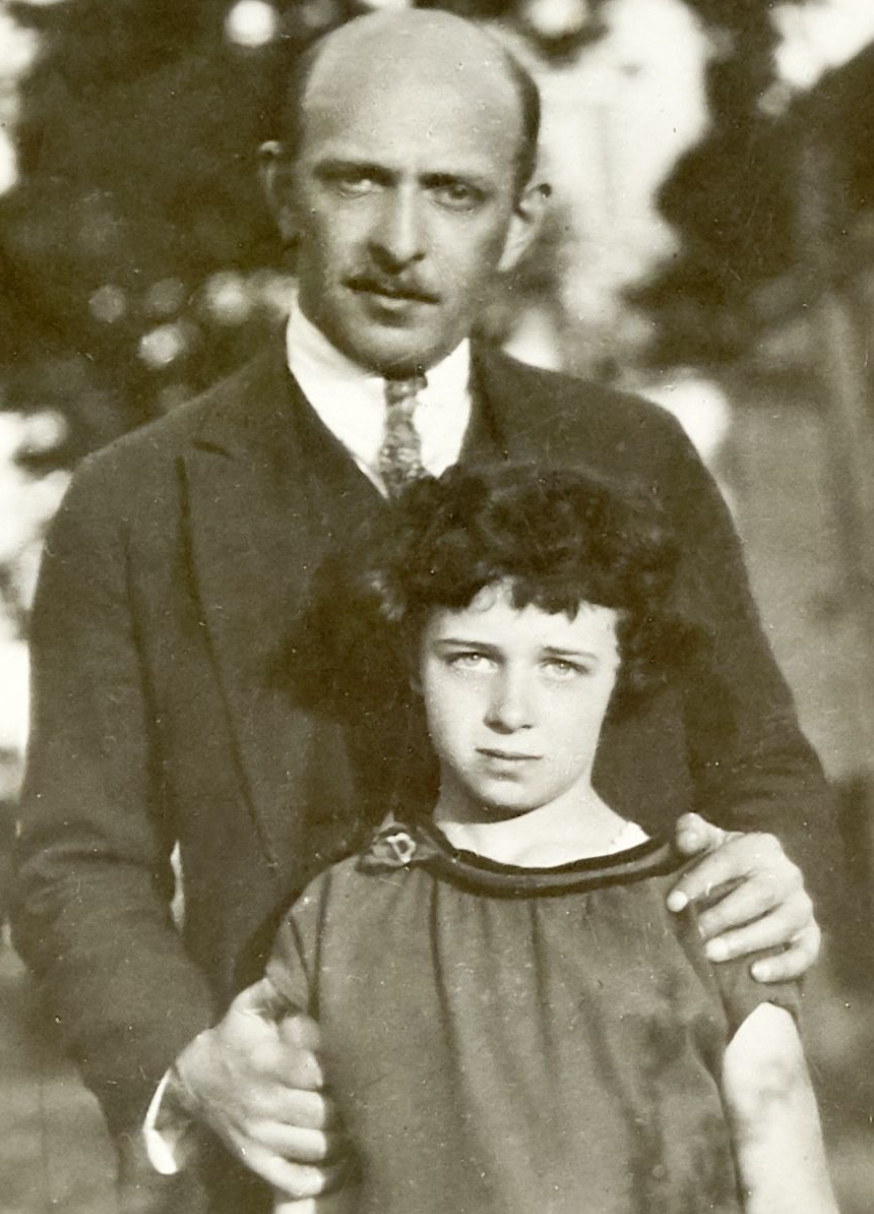
Tenenbaum with daughter Irena, 1932

Tenenbaum was born in Warsaw in a Jewish family. Even as a child, he collected insect specimens, and his father brought specimens of natural history as souvenirs from trips. He was influenced by the beetle collector Ludwik Hildt. After studying at the Kreczmar High School he went to the Jagiellonian University where he studied the anatomy of the Malphigian tubules under Henryk Ferdynand Hoyer. He then became a teacher at the Jewish College in Warsaw. In 1932 he received a PhD from the University of Vilnius, studying entomology under Jan Prüffer (1890–1958). He specialized especially in the beetles, naming his first new species from the Balearic Islands (visiting it in 1913) after his teacher, Dendarus hildti. Still later he described Kytorrhinus hoyeri honoring Hoyer (now considered a synonym of Bruchidius albolineatus)and Scaurus eleonorae for his wife Eleonora. Tenenbaum wrote a zoological guide to the vicinity of Warsaw (Przewodnik zoologiczny po okolicach Warszawy) with Stanisław Michał Sumiński in 1921 which describes the habitats in the region including many that no longer exist. He also took an interest in herpetology. During the German invasion of Poland in 1939 he was trapped in the Warsaw Ghetto, locked up with his wife Eleonora and daughter Irena. He became unwell, and although his friends the Żabiński couple (depicted in the film The Zookeeper's Wife) offered to organize his escape, he refused and died at home.
