= The Zookeeper's Wife (film) =

2017 film by Niki Caro

- Theatrical release poster
- Directed by: Niki Caro
- Written by: Angela Workman
- Based on: The Zookeeper's Wife by Diane Ackerman
- Produced by: Jeff Abberley; Jamie Patricof; Diane Miller Levin; Kim Zubick; Robbie Tollin
- Starring: Jessica Chastain; Johan Heldenbergh; Daniel Brühl; Michael McElhatton
- Cinematography: Andrij Parekh
- Edited by: David Coulson
- Music by: Harry Gregson-Williams
- Production companies: Scion Films; Electric City Entertainment; Tollin Productions; Rowe/Miller Productions; Czech Anglo Productions
- Distributed by: Focus Features (United States); Universal Pictures (Select territories)
- Release dates: 8 March 2017 (Warsaw); 31 March 2017 (United States); 21 April 2017 (United Kingdom)
- Running time: 126 minutes
- Countries: United States; United Kingdom; Czech Republic
- Languages: English, German, Hebrew
- Budget: $20 million
- Box office: $26.2 million

The Zookeeper's Wife is a 2017 war drama film directed by Niki Caro, based on the 2007 non-fiction book by Diane Ackerman. The film tells the story of how Jan and Antonina Żabiński rescued hundreds of Polish Jews from the Germans by hiding them in their Warsaw zoo during World War II. It stars Jessica Chastain, Johan Heldenbergh, Daniel Brühl and Michael McElhatton.

The Zookeeper's Wife had its world premiere on 8 March 2017 in Warsaw, Poland, the location of the story, followed by its US premiere at the Cinequest Film Festival in San Jose, California, on 12 March 2017. It was released in the United States on 31 March and in the United Kingdom on 21 April 2017. The film received mixed reviews from critics, and grossed $26 million on a $20 million budget.

== Plot ==
Doctor Jan Żabiński is director of the Warsaw Zoo, one of Europe's largest, assisted by his wife, Antonina. On 1 September 1939, the bombardment of Warsaw begins. Antonina and her son Ryszard survive the German and Russian invasion of Poland and Warsaw is occupied by the Germans. Doctor Lutz Heck, head of the Berlin Zoo, Adolf Hitler's chief zoologist and Jan's professional rival, visits the zoo in Jan's absence. Offering to house their prized animals in Berlin until after the war, he returns with soldiers to shoot the others. He becomes infatuated with Antonina.

Warsaw's Jews are forced into the Warsaw Ghetto and the Żabińskis' Jewish friends, Maurycy Fraenkel and Magda Gross, seek a safe place for their friend Szymon Tenenbaum's insect collection. Jan and Antonina use the zoo to hide Magda and the others. They propose Heck turn the now abandoned zoo into a pig farm, to feed the occupying forces, hoping to sneak people out of the Ghetto. Heck agrees, wanting a new site for experiments in recreating aurochs as a symbol of the Reich, (Note: While Heck is accurately portrayed as taking part in the pillaging of the Warsaw Zoo, his aurochs experiments were not conducted in Warsaw, but at the Berlin Zoological Garden.).

When Jan collects garbage in the Ghetto, he conceals people in the trucks for transport to the zoo, so the Polish resistance (the Home Army) can get them to safehouses throughout the country. The Żabińskis hide Jews in the zoo's cages, tunnels, and their own house. Antonina plays the piano at night to signal it is safe to come out of hiding, and by day if they must hide. When Jan rescues Urszula, a young girl raped by German soldiers, Antonina takes a particular interest in her, treating her as she would a frightened animal, until she emerges to join other "guests" in the Zabinskis' home.

In 1942, Germans begin transporting Jews to death camps. Jan, forced to load children into the cattle cars, tries to convince Janusz Korczak, head of the Jewish children's orphanage, to escape with him, but he refuses to abandon the children. Jan also becomes aware of Heck's obvious feelings for his wife, which strains his relationship with her.

In 1943, two women rescued by Jan and disguised as Aryans by Antonina are discovered and executed outside their boarding house. After the failed uprising, Germans burn down the Ghetto on Hitler's birthday, also the first night of Passover while the hidden Jews mournfully celebrate a secret Passover Seder.

Jan reconciles with Antonina before departing to join the Warsaw Uprising and she gives birth to a baby girl, Teresa. Jan is shot and captured, presumed dead. Heck's attraction to Antonina intensifies, and she struggles to fend him off while safeguarding the hidden Jews. Visiting the house unexpectedly, Heck questions Ryzard unsuccessfully about his parents' whereabouts. In growing suspicion and rage, he pins a Nazi cross to the boy's shirt and goads him to say "Heil Hitler." As he leaves, Ryszard cries out "Hitler ist kaput!"

Warsaw's evacuation begins in January 1945. Antonina seeks Heck's help to locate the missing Jan. When asked what he will get in return, she begins to undress but confesses he disgusts her. With suspicions fully aroused, Heck calls for his car to take him to the zoo. Antonina races home and evacuates her guests just as Heck arrives. Magda takes baby Teresa with her, and Antonia conceals Ryszard when he insists on staying.

Heck enters the house in a fury and discovers the basement drawings: Stars of David, dates, and guests drawn with animal faces. He uncovers Ryszard and catches him after a brief chase. Locking Antonina in a cage, he drags the boy out of sight. When a shot rings out, she collapses in grief. A moment later, Heck walks back to his car, leaving the zoo for good. Ryszard returns to her side, unharmed. The two join the march out of Warsaw.

Warsaw began rebuilding four months after the Nazi surrender. Antonina and the children return to the damaged zoo, along with Jerzyk, their loyal zookeeper. Jan returns home from a prison camp. They paint Stars of David on all the cages in the zoo.

A postscript announces that the Żabińskis saved 300 Jews. Heck's zoo in Berlin was destroyed by Allied bombings, and his aurochs experiments were a failure. The Żabińskis were recognized by Israel (Yad Vashem) for their righteous acts and defiance against the Germans. They rebuilt the present day Warsaw Zoo.

== Cast ==
- Jessica Chastain as Antonina Żabińska
- Johan Heldenbergh as Jan Żabiński
- Daniel Brühl as Lutz Heck
- Michael McElhatton as Jerzyk
- Iddo Goldberg as Maurycy Fraenkel
- Efrat Dor as Magda Gross
- Shira Haas as Urszula
- Val Maloku as Ryszard Żabiński
- Timothy Radford as Young Ryszard Żabiński
- Martha Issová as Regina Kenigswein
- Goran Kostić as Mr. Kinszerbaum
- Arnošt Goldflam as Janusz Korczak

== Historical context ==
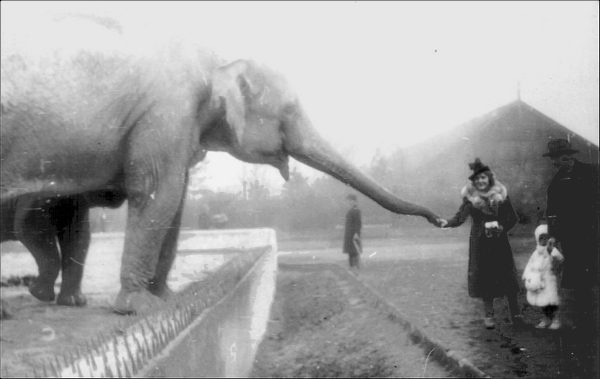
The Warsaw Zoo pictured in 1938, a year before the outbreak of World War II.

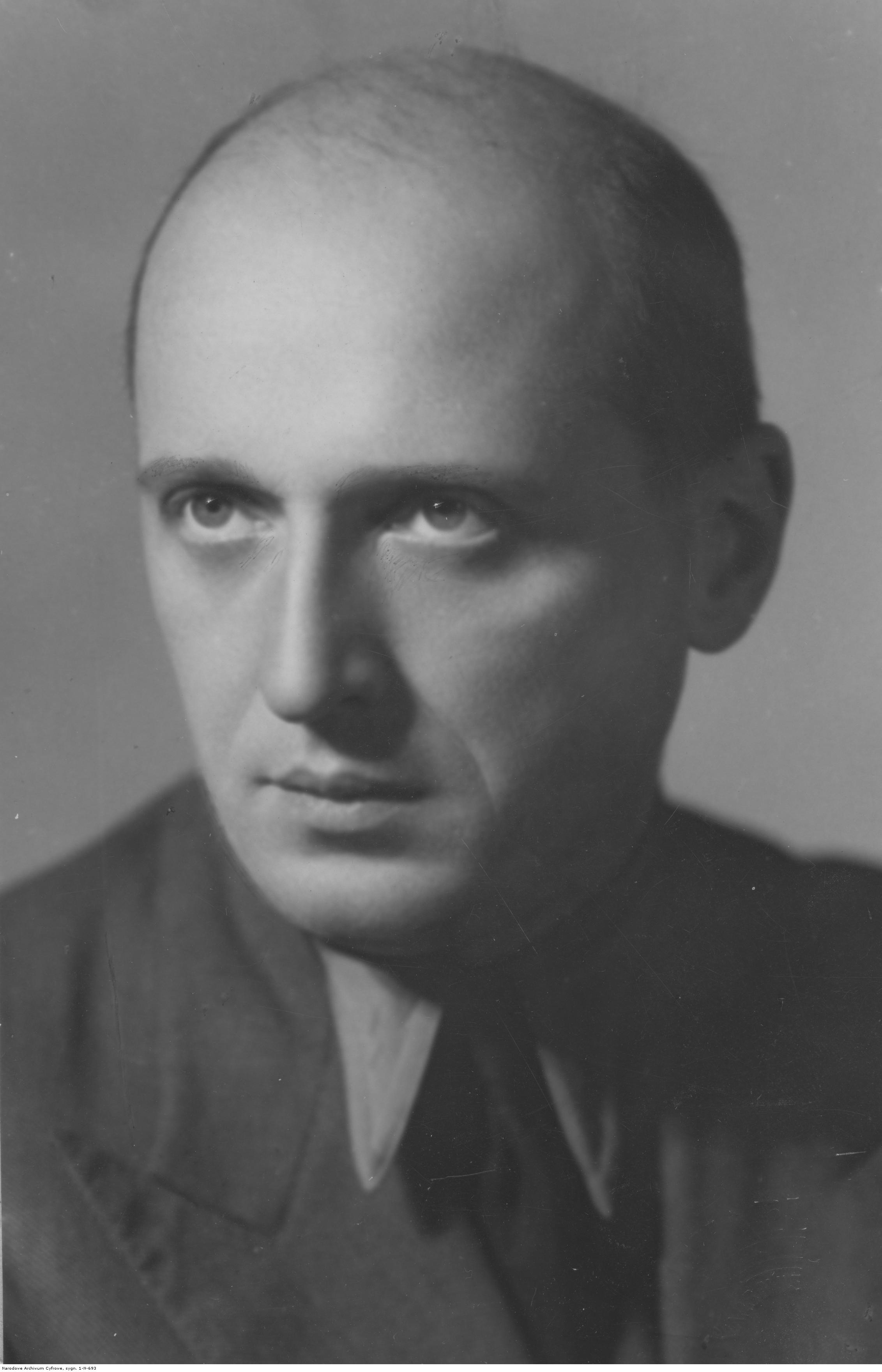
Jan Żabiński, the director and superintendent of the Warsaw Zoo

The Zookeeper's Wife is based on Diane Ackerman's non-fiction book of the same name, which relied heavily on the diaries of Antonina Żabińska, published in Poland as Ludzie i zwierzęta (translated as: People and Animals) (1968). In key aspects of historical context, the screenplay follows the story of Antonina and her husband, Jan, closely. Both worked at the Warsaw Zoo. Antonina helped her husband who was the director of the zoo. Animals were part of their family's life, and the devastation that resulted from the attack on Warsaw and the subsequent pillaging of the zoo is well documented. The actions of Lutz Heck and his animal breeding experiments were also a matter of historical record, although the intimate relationship of the protagonist, Antonina, and the antagonist, Heck, is exaggerated. However, the defiance of Nazi occupation and ultimately, the rescue of over 300 Jews from the Warsaw Ghetto were depicted accurately. The contributions and participation of the Żabinski children, Ryszard and Teresa (credited as Theresa in the film) were also correctly portrayed.

== Production ==
=== Development ===
In September 2010, it was announced that Angela Workman was adapting Diane Ackerman's non-fiction book, The Zookeeper's Wife. On 30 April 2013, Jessica Chastain was attached to play the titular role as Antonina Żabińska, while Niki Caro signed on to direct the film. On 24 August 2015, Focus Features acquired the US rights to the film, and Daniel Brühl and Johan Heldenbergh signed on to star in it.

=== Filming ===
Filming began with the animals on 9 September 2015, and principal photography with the actors began on 29 September 2015, in Prague, Czech Republic. Suzie Davies served as the production designer, Andrij Parekh as the director of photography, and Bina Daigeler as the costume designer. Filming ended on 29 November 2015.

== Release ==
The Zookeeper's Wife had its world premiere on 8 March 2017 in Warsaw, Poland, and its US premiere at the Cinequest Film Festival on 12 March 2017. The film was released in the United States on 31 March 2017 and was released in the United Kingdom on 21 April 2017. It premiered in Spain at the Barcelona-Sant Jordi International Film Festival on 22 April 2017. It also premiered in France at the 43rd Deauville Film Festival on 7 September 2017.

A special screening was held at the US Holocaust Museum in Washington DC on 22 March 2017, with a panel discussion including speakers Diane Ackerman, Jessica Chastain, Niki Caro and Angela Workman. Prior to the film's release, Focus Features partnered with the International Rescue Committee to screen the film in cities across the country, including a special screening at the Museum of Tolerance in Los Angeles, California, and a special screening in New York City, with a panel of speakers which included Chastain, Caro and Workman. The New York screening occurred on behalf of the Anne Frank Center for Mutual Respect, and was hosted by activist Steven Goldstein. The film speakers were joined by Sarah O'Hagan of the International Rescue Committee. The evening's topic of discussion was the rescue of Jewish refugees during the Holocaust, and the current refugee crisis in Europe.

The film began running on HBO on 23 December 2017.

== Reception ==
=== Box office ===
The Zookeeper's Wife grossed $17.6 million in the United States and Canada and $8.6 million in other territories for a worldwide total of $26.2 million, against a production budget of $20 million.

In North America, the film grossed $3.3 million in its opening weekend from 541 theaters (a per-theater average of $6,191), finishing 10th at the box office. It remained the top grossing indie film in its second, third and fourth weeks of release.

The film remained the top grossing specialty film of 2017 in its fifth week of release, with IndieWire praising the film's release strategy, saying: "Focus’ aggressive push for this Jessica Chastain Holocaust rescue story has paid off with the top result for any specialized audience release since awards season. It won't hit the level of Woman in Gold two years ago ($33 million), but that's more of a factor of the steep decline in overall upscale grosses and more competition at the moment than other differences between the two films." In its eighth and ninth weeks of release, The Zookeeper's Wife was the third highest grossing specialty release of 2017, despite a reduction in its theater count. In its tenth week of release, IndieWire said the film "has been a rare specialized standout this spring."

The film remained the top-selling war film for the first three months of its home media release.

=== Critical response ===
On review aggregator Rotten Tomatoes, the film holds an approval rating of 64% based on 183 reviews. The website's critical consensus reads: "The Zookeeper's Wife has noble intentions, but is ultimately unable to bring its fact-based story to life with quite as much impact as it deserves." On Metacritic, the film has a weighted average score of 57 out of 100, based on 36 critics, indicating "mixed or average reviews". PostTrak reported that over 90% of audience members gave the film a rating of either "excellent" or "very good".

IndieWire listed The Zookeeper's Wife on its shortlist of best indie films of the year, stating: "Niki Caro’s fact-based historical drama is a heartbreaker of the highest order, anchored by an understated performance by Jessica Chastain and a series of wrenching dramatic twists that will wring tears out of even the hardest of hearts." Mick LaSalle, writing for The San Francisco Chronicle, gave the film a 5-star review, saying that it "grabs us from its first seconds" and that:

The Zookeeper's Wife achieves its grandeur not through the depiction of grand movements, but through its attentiveness to the shifts and flickers of the soul. The war was a great external event, but Caro reminds us that it was experienced internally, by the people and the animals who had to try to live through it.

Kenneth Turan, in the Los Angeles Times, says "Niki Caro and Jessica Chastain create an emotionally satisfying Zookeeper's Wife". The AP, the national wire service, says the film "tells a riveting true story" that is "both inspiring and comes as a welcome reminder in this time of uncertainty that even in the face of astonishing evil, humanity and goodness can also rise to the occasion." Jacob Soll in The New Republic heralded the film as the "first feminist Holocaust film".

In a negative review, Variety's Peter Debruge said, "There’s no nice way to put it in this case, but The Zookeeper’s Wife has the unfortunate failing of rendering its human drama less interesting than what happens to the animals — and for a subject as damaging to our species as the Holocaust, that no small shortcoming." In contrast, Variety's Kristopher Tapley wrote that the film deserved consideration as an Oscar contender.

Stephen Holden of The New York Times said the film "was like Schindler's List with pets," writing that it was "so timid and sanitized it almost feels safe for children."

Polish reviewers expressed a strong positive response to the film, which spoke to their history. The Krakow Post stated: "On a universal level (the film) is a prayer for sanity and the civilized values of charity, empathy, and humanity in any time which finds itself threatened to be ruled by mass insanity, hatred, and barbarism. Lessons derived from this darkest period of recent history can never be untimely."

Alexandra Macaaron, in Women's Voices For Change, gave the film a rave review, noting that The Zookeeper's Wife is a rarity among Holocaust films, and is distinguished by its female perspective on war and the struggle to protect every living soul, strangers and friends alike.

=== Accolades ===
At the 2016 Heartland Film Festival, held each October in Indianapolis, Indiana, The Zookeeper's Wife was awarded the "Truly Moving Picture Award"; emblematic of the festival's goal to "inspire filmmakers and audiences through the transformative power of film."

The Zookeeper's Wife was awarded the Audience Choice Award for Best Narrative Feature at the 2017 Seattle Jewish Film Festival.

In April 2017, Political Film Society USA nominated The Zookeeper's Wife for its PFS award, in the category "Human Rights".

List of Accolades
Award / Film Festival	Category	Recipient(s)	Result
Heartland Film Festival 2017	Truly Moving Picture Award	Niki Caro	Won
Women Film Critics Circle 2017	The Invisible Woman Award	Jessica Chastain	Nominated
Women Film Critics Circle 2017	Best Woman Storyteller (Screenwriting Award)	Angela Workman	Nominated

== See also ==
- List of Holocaust films

== Bibliography ==
- Ackerman, Diane (2007). The Zookeeper's Wife: A War Story. New York: W. W. Norton & Company. ISBN 978-0-3933-3306-0.
- Heck, Lutz. Animals, My Adventure. London: Methuen, 1954. ISBN 978-954-642-235-4.
