= Warsaw Zoo =

Zoo in Poland

Warsaw Zoological Garden
- Ogród Zoologiczny w Warszawie

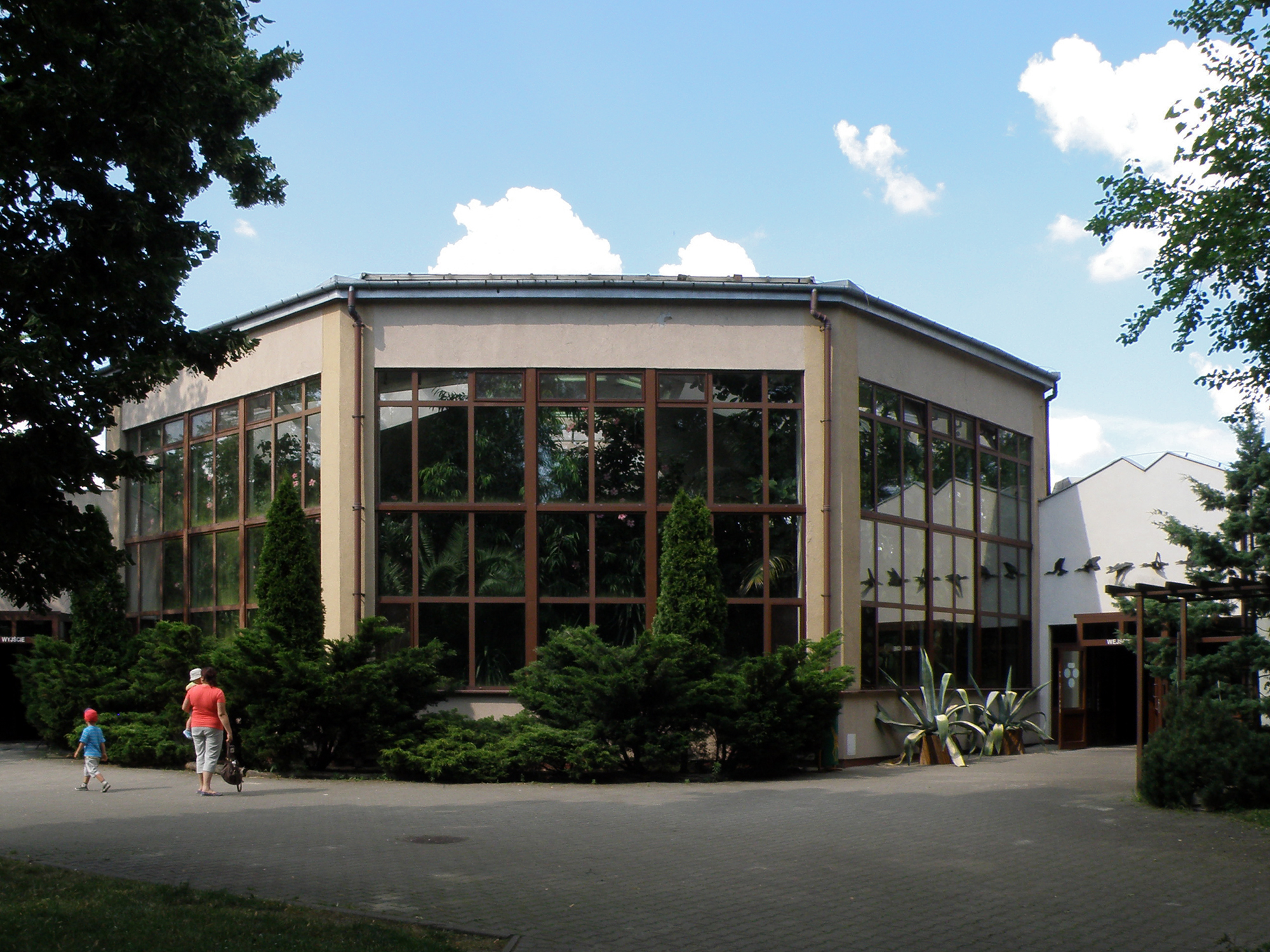
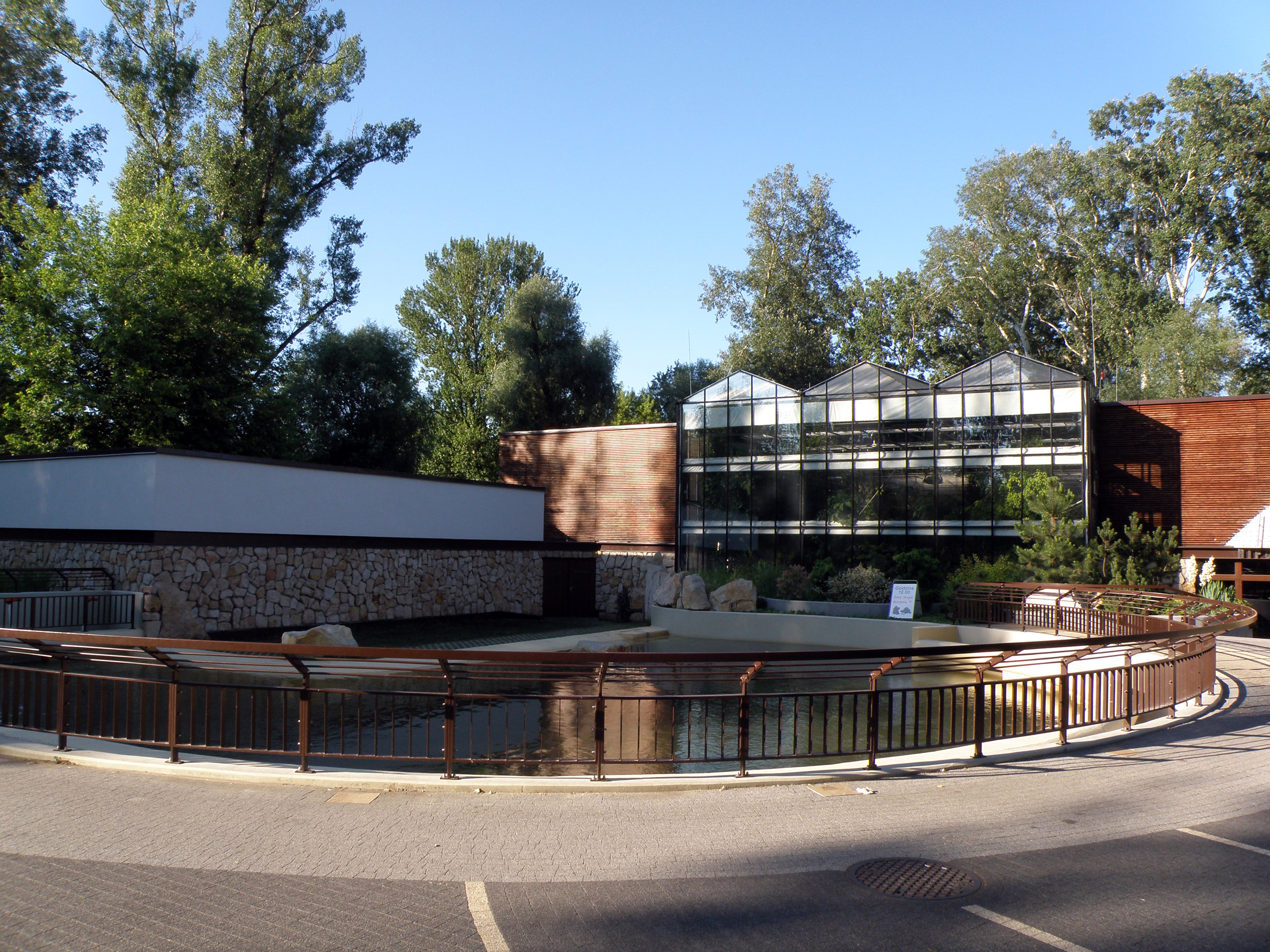
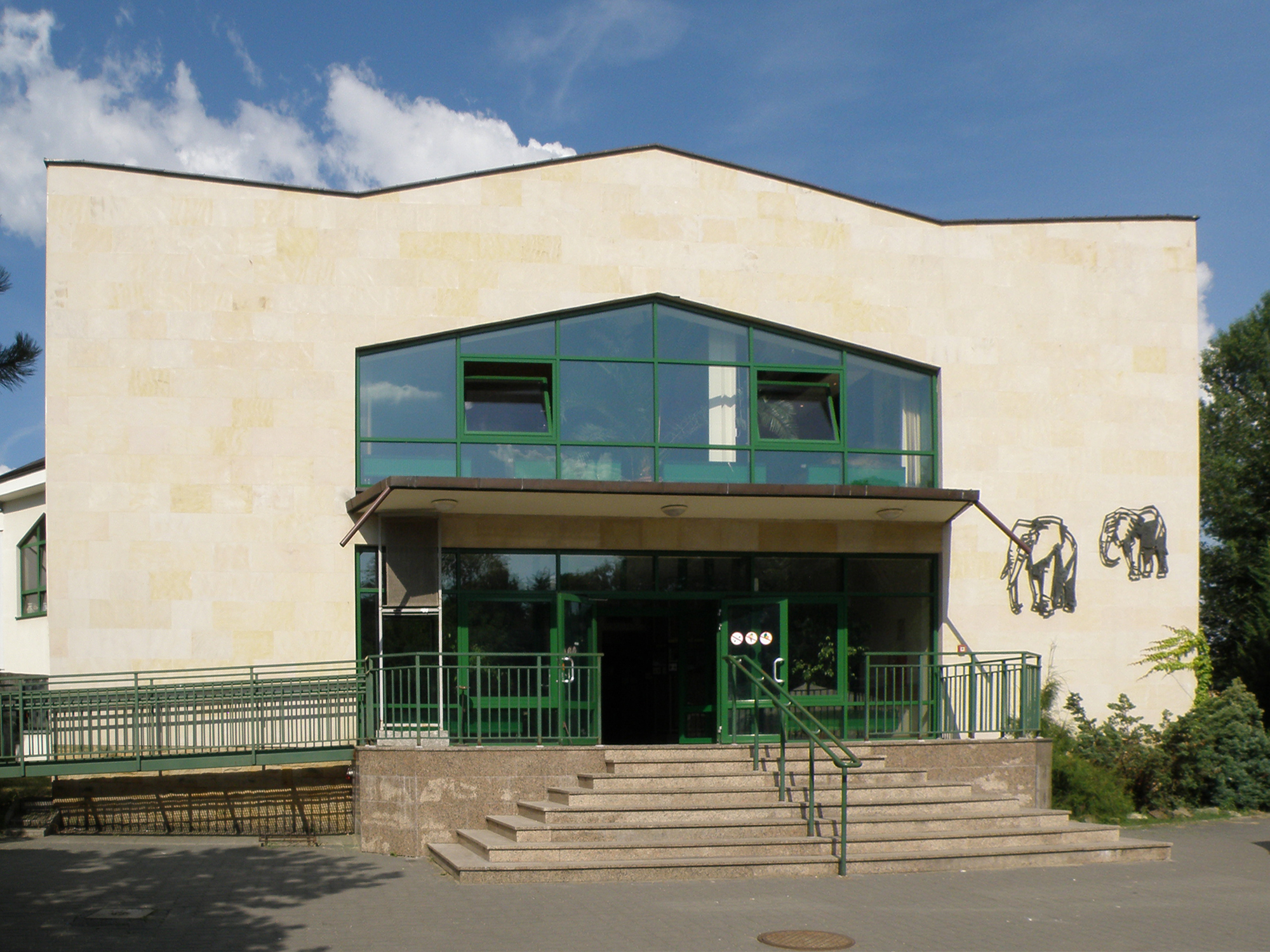
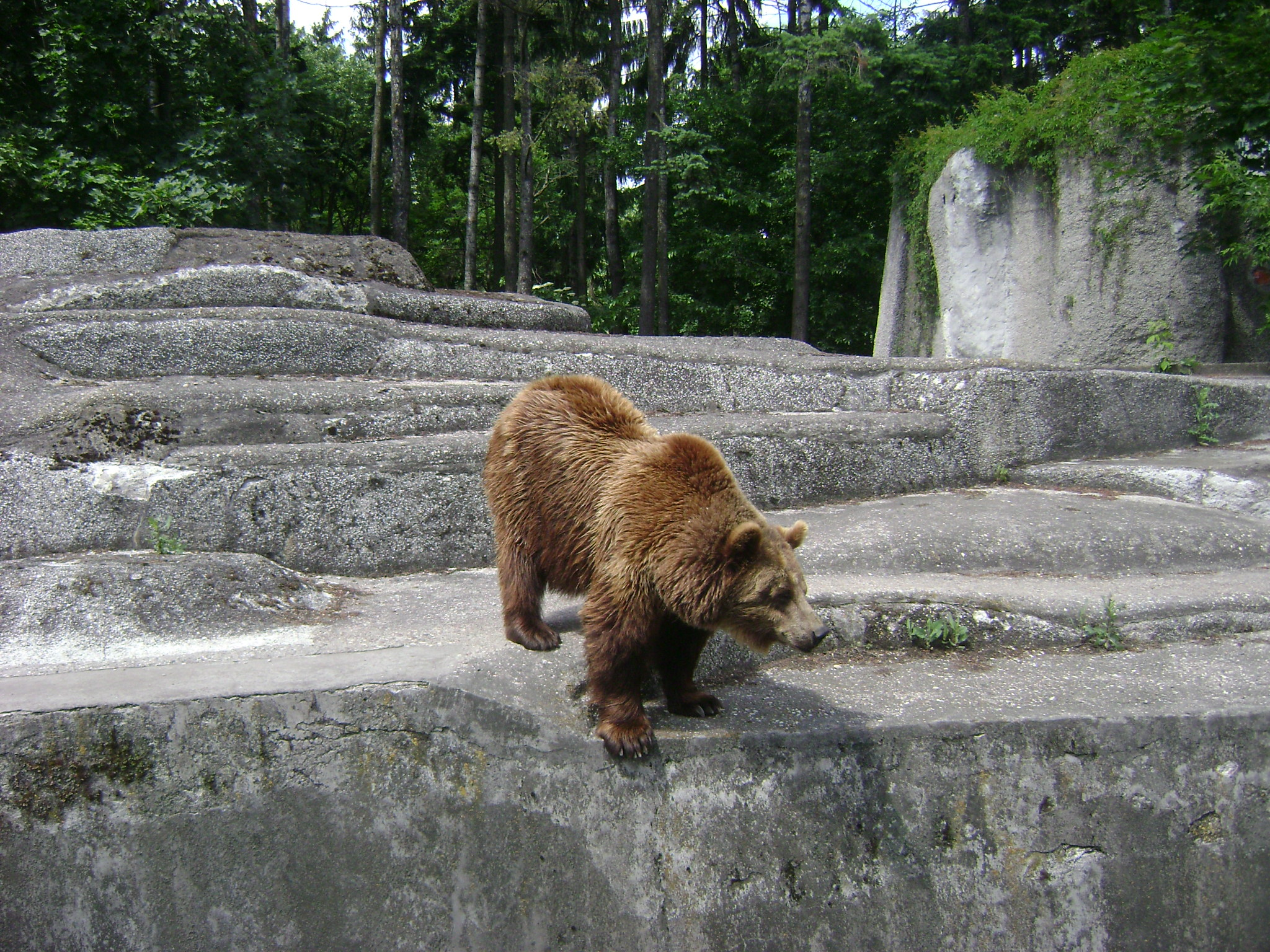
- Left to right: Aviary • Hippopotamus enclosure • Elephant house • Bear enclosure
- Interactive map of Warsaw Zoological Garden
- 52°15′28″N 21°01′20″E
- Date opened: 1928–1939, 1948
- Location: Warsaw, Poland
- Land area: 40 hectares (99 acres)
- No. of animals: 11,764 (4 November 2019)
- No. of species: 534 (4 November 2019)
- Annual visitors: 700,000 (2016)
- Memberships: EAZA, WAZA
- Director: Andrzej Kruszewicz
- Website: www.zoo.waw.pl

The Antonina and Jan Żabiński Municipal Zoological Garden, known simply as the Warsaw Zoo (Polish: Miejski Ogród Zoologiczny im. Antoniny i Jana Żabińskich w Warszawie), is a scientific zoo located alongside the Vistula River in Warsaw, Poland. The zoo officially adopted this name on January 1, 2023, to honor its former director Jan Żabiński and his wife Antonina. Opened in 1928, the zoo covers about 40 hectares (99 acres) in central Warsaw, and sees over 700,000 visitors annually, making it one of the most popular zoos in Poland. It is home to over 11,000 animals representing more than 500 species.

The zoo is an accredited member of the European Association of Zoos and Aquaria (EAZA) and the World Association of Zoos and Aquariums (WAZA).

The Warsaw Zoo served as a hiding place for Jews and escapees from the Warsaw Ghetto during World War II. Zookeepers Jan and Antonina Żabiński, responsible for saving hundreds of Jews within the zoo premises, were eventually granted the title of Righteous Among the Nations for their contribution, effort and good will. These events were documented in the novel The Zookeeper's Wife by Diane Ackerman and in the 2017 war drama film starring Jessica Chastain.

== History ==
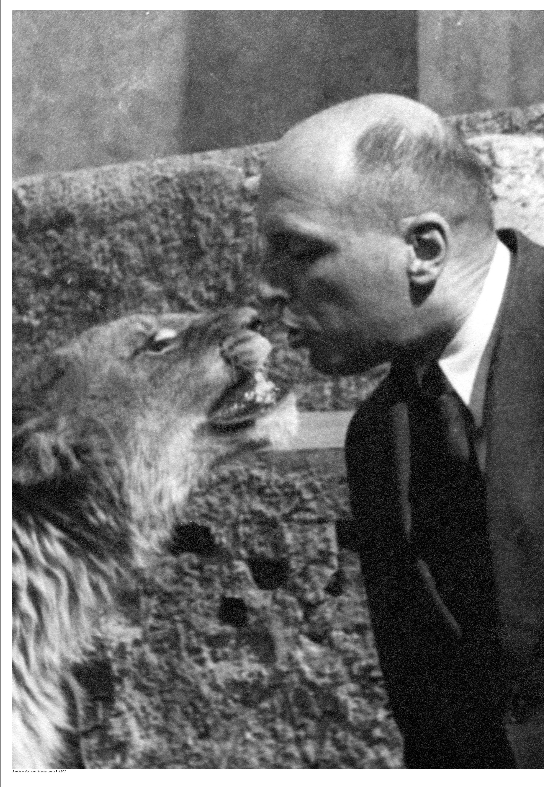
Jan Żabiński with a lion, unknown date

=== Establishment ===
Although the current zoo was opened on 11 March 1928, its roots can be traced to 17th century private menageries, often open to the public. King John III Sobieski kept a court menagerie in Wilanów, and the 19th century saw several private zoos opened in the city.

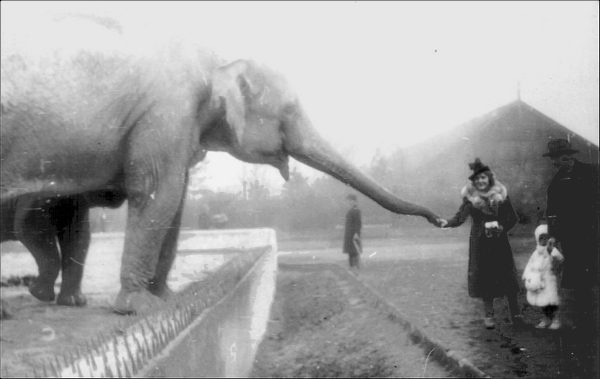
The zoo in 1938

M. Pągowski opened a small zoo on Koszykowa Street in 1926, and moved this zoo to a new 10,000-square-metre (110,000 sq ft) area on 3 Maja Avenue in 1927. The construction of the 32-hectare (79-acre) City Zoological Garden was started in 1927 as well. In November 1927 the zoo gained a director when Wenanty Burdziński, former director and founder of the zoological garden in Kyiv, was appointed to the post. Construction of the zoo was fast, and the zoo was opened in March 1928, with some animals purchased from M. Pągowski and some donated by the Pedagogical Museum, which had a small zoo on its premises. Animals resident at the zoo when it opened included lions, tigers, and a female Indian elephant named Kasia.

Wenanty Burdziński died of acute pneumonia before the end of 1928, and Jan Żabiński was appointed director. Before World War II, Jan oversaw the creation of several exhibits including the monkey house, elephant house, enclosures for antelopes, a seal pond, and the giraffe barn. He was director of the zoo until 1939, was re-appointed in 1949, and continued in the post until 1951.

In 1937 the zoo's female elephant Kasia gave birth to the first Indian elephant born in a Polish zoo.

=== World War II ===
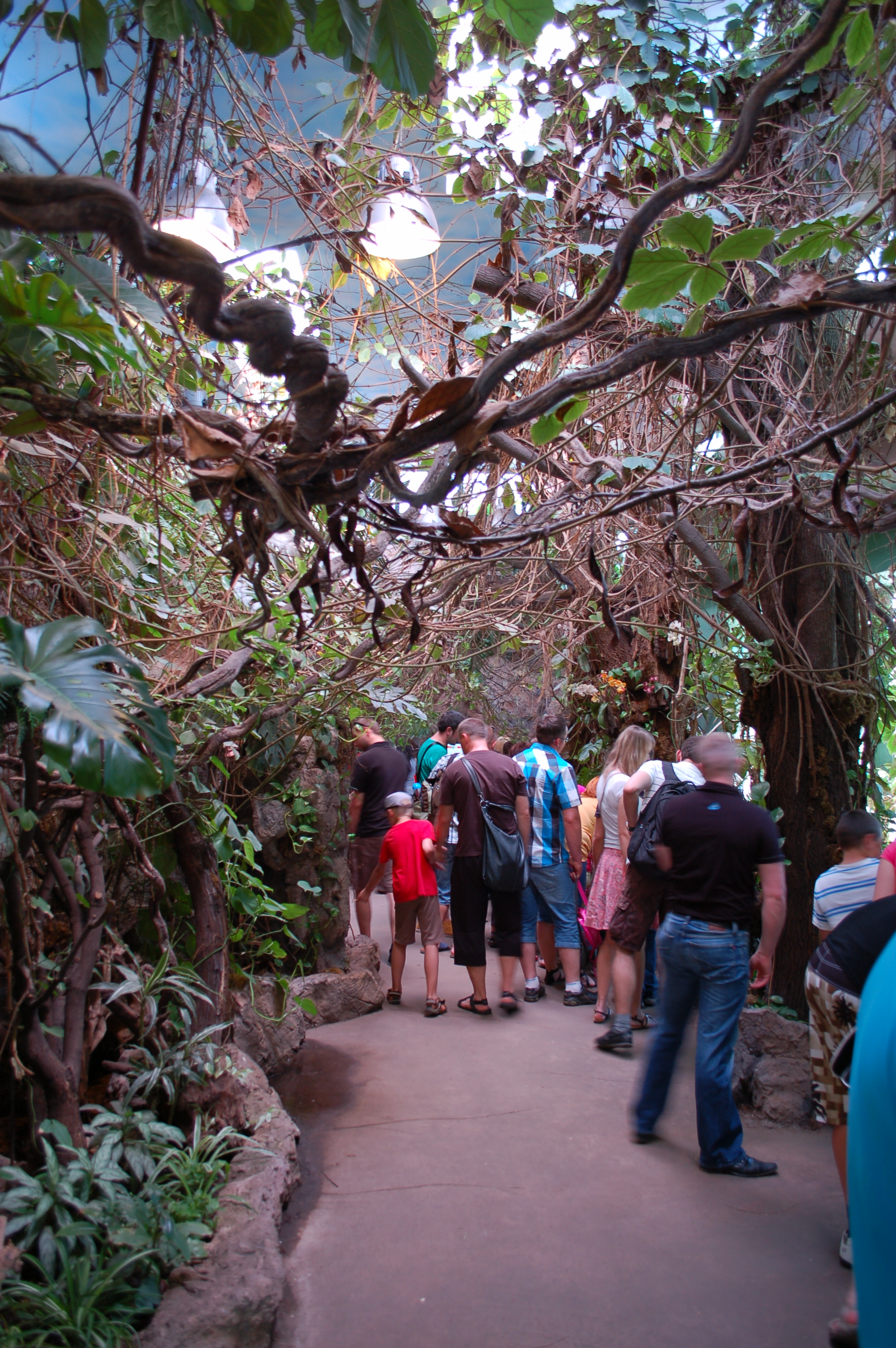
House of the Invertebrates

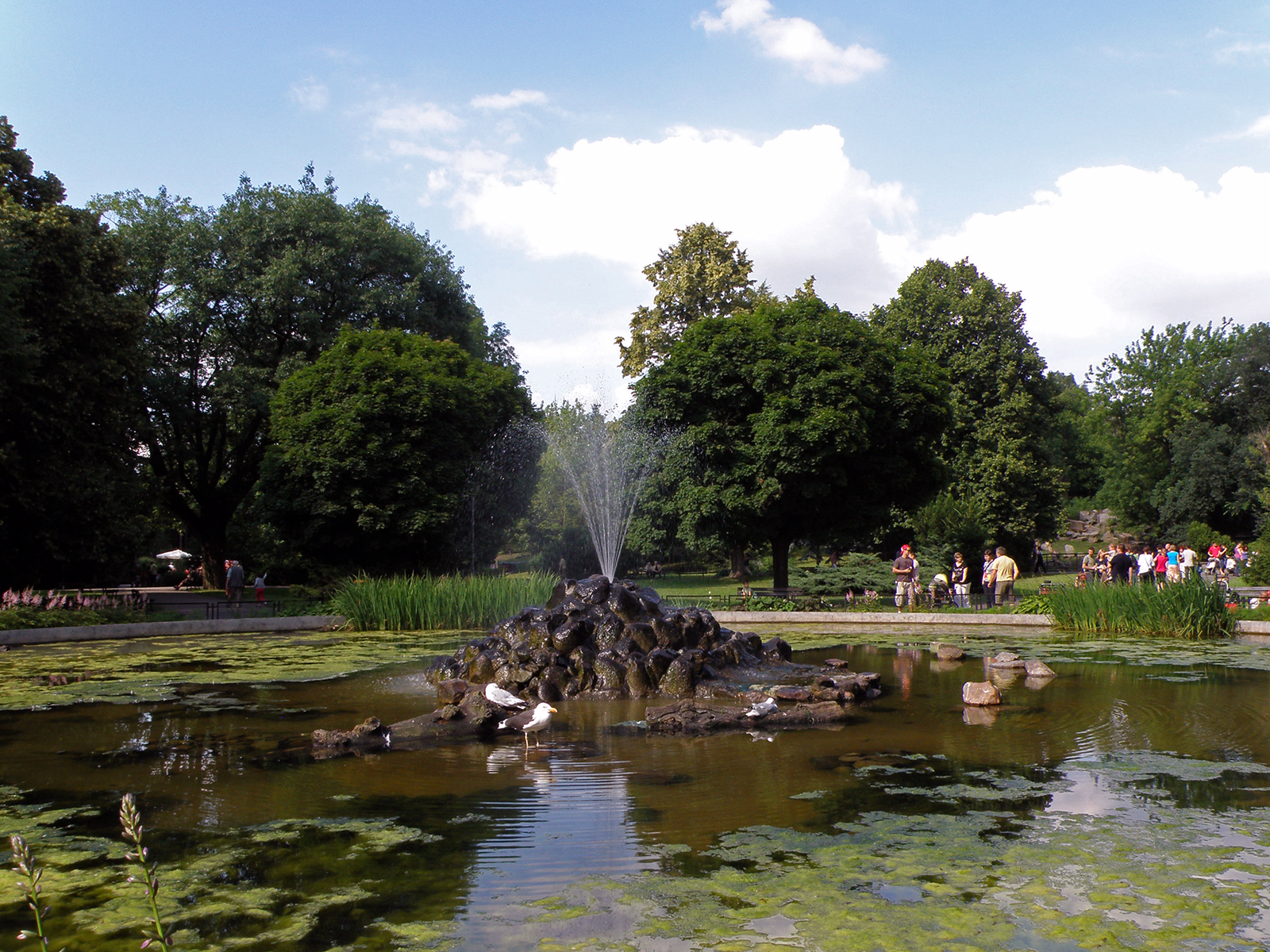
A pond at Warsaw Zoo

The zoo was bombed regularly in September 1939, and many animals died from the bombs, bullets (e.g. apes) or missiles (e.g. an elephant, a giraffe). After the surrender of Warsaw to the Germans, most of the 'valuable' animal species (in the eyes of German representative Lutz Heck) were taken to the Schorfeide reserve in Germany, while others, described as 'not valuable' were shot, and the zoo was closed. During World War II, Jan Żabiński, the director, together with his wife Antonina and their son Ryszard, saved more than 300 Jews from the Holocaust. Jan Żabinski was seriously injured during the 1944 Warsaw uprising, and taken prisoner. When he returned, animals started being reintroduced to the zoo, which was reopened in 1949.

== Exhibits ==
=== Elephants ===
This 6,000-square-metre (65,000 sq ft) exhibit was opened in 2003, and includes two outdoor pools, an indoor pool, and individual indoor paddocks and an indoor walk for the African elephants. As of 2012, it houses one male and three female elephants.

=== Hippopotamus House & Shark Aquarium ===
Opened in April 2010, this facility has both an outdoor and indoor pool for the Hippos. The indoor hippo pool includes a large glass area where visitors can watch the hippos underwater. Past the hippo pool and in a shaded room is a 100,000-litre (26,000 US gal) salt water tank, which is the largest single fish tank in Poland. The aquarium includes the only sand tiger shark in Poland, as well as other fish, including Arabian carpet sharks, Zebrasoma species, yellow tang, and other reef species.

=== Ape House ===
The Ape House was opened in September 2008, and is home to the zoo's gorillas and chimpanzees. As of 2012, the zoo was home to 3 gorillas and 9 chimpanzees. Visitors can observe the apes from large indoor paths surrounded by water, or from outside the building, separated from the apes by glass.

== Directors ==
- Wenanty Burdziński, until 1928
- Jan Żabiński, 1928–1951
- Jan Landowski, 1951–1972
- Zbigniew Woliński, 1972–1981
- Jan Maciej Rembiszewski, 1982–2009
- Andrzej Kruszewicz, 2009–present

== Popular culture ==
In 2007, an American writer Diane Ackerman published her non-fiction biography titled The Zookeeper's Wife, which tells the story of the Żabiński family's activities during World War II, drawing upon Antonina Żabińska's diary.

The book by Ackerman about the couple, The Zookeeper's Wife, was made into a movie in 2015 and released on March 31, 2017, starring American actress Jessica Chastain portraying Antonina and Belgian actor Johan Heldenbergh portraying the director of the zoo Jan.

== Gallery ==
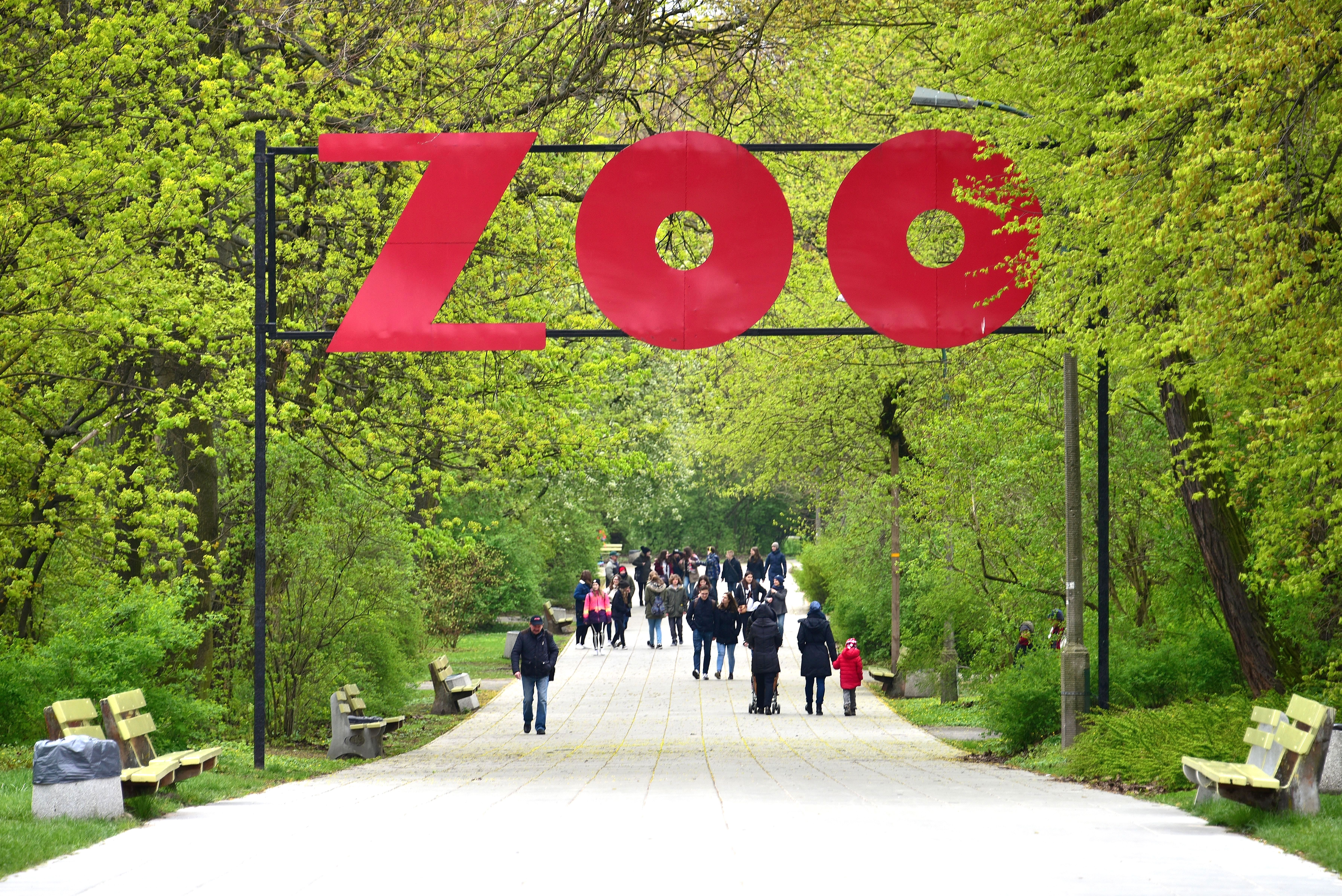
The Kazimierz Lisiecki Alley leading to the main entrance of the Warsaw Zoo

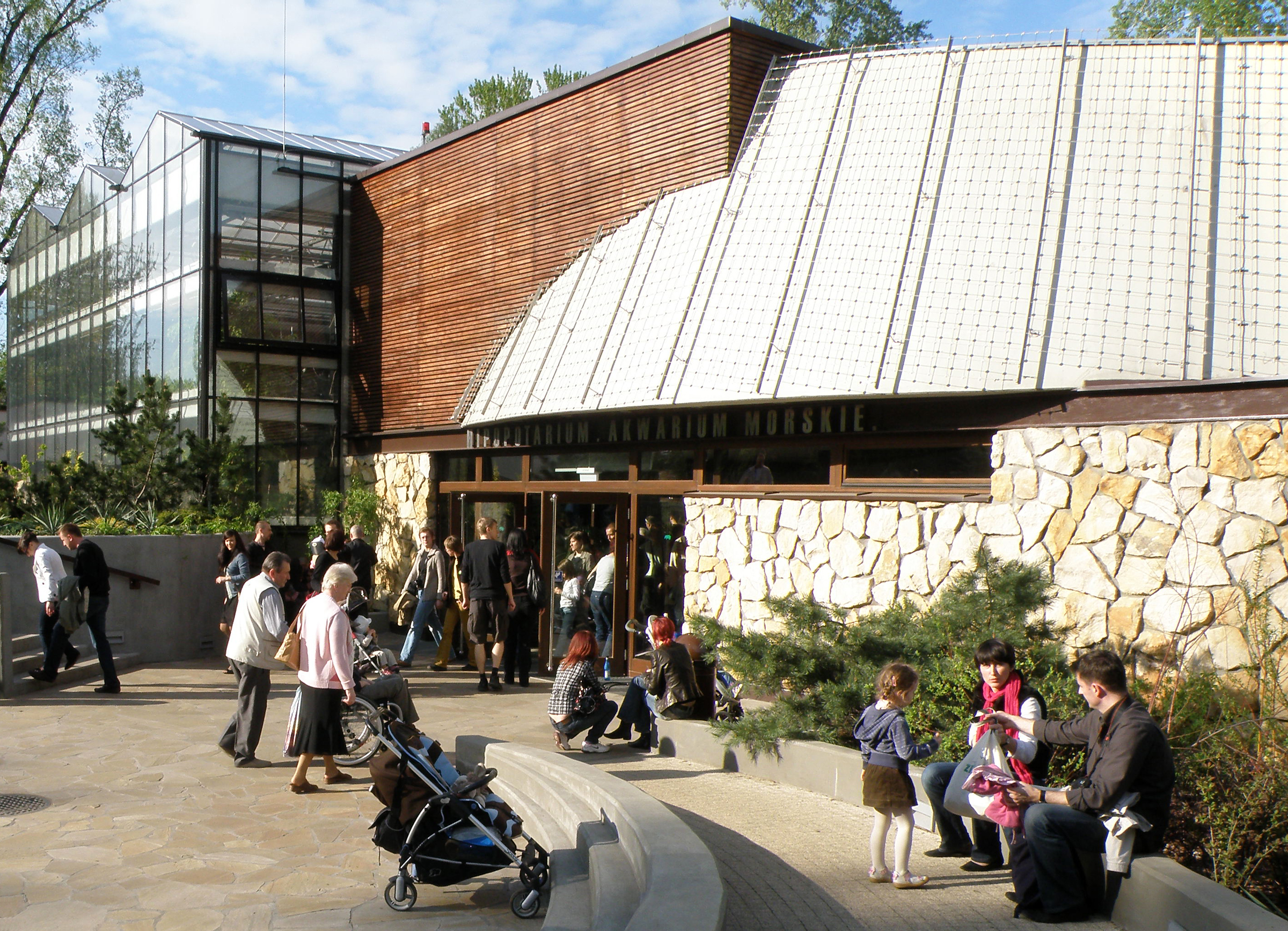
The Hippopotamus Pavilion

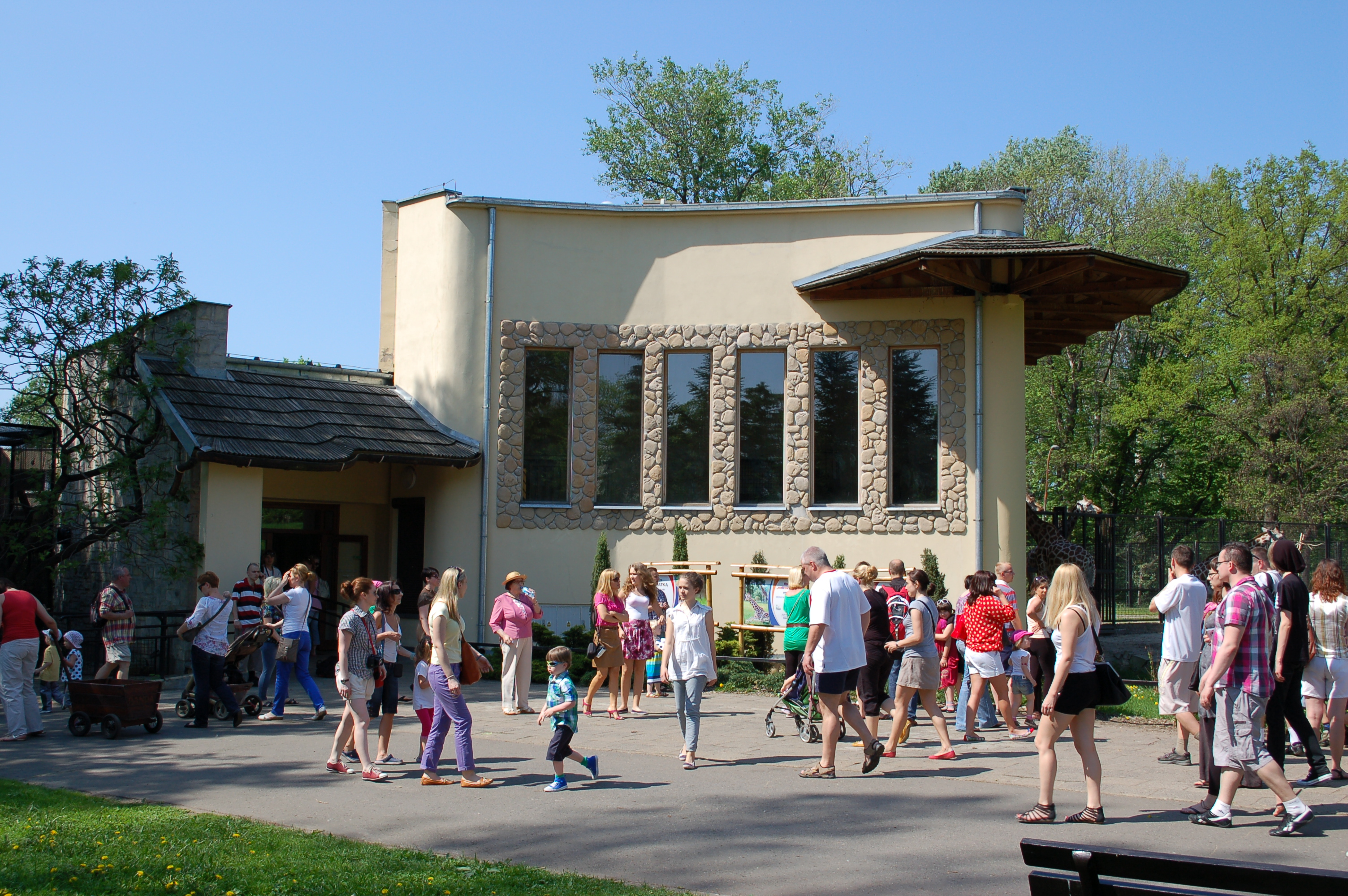
The Giraffe House

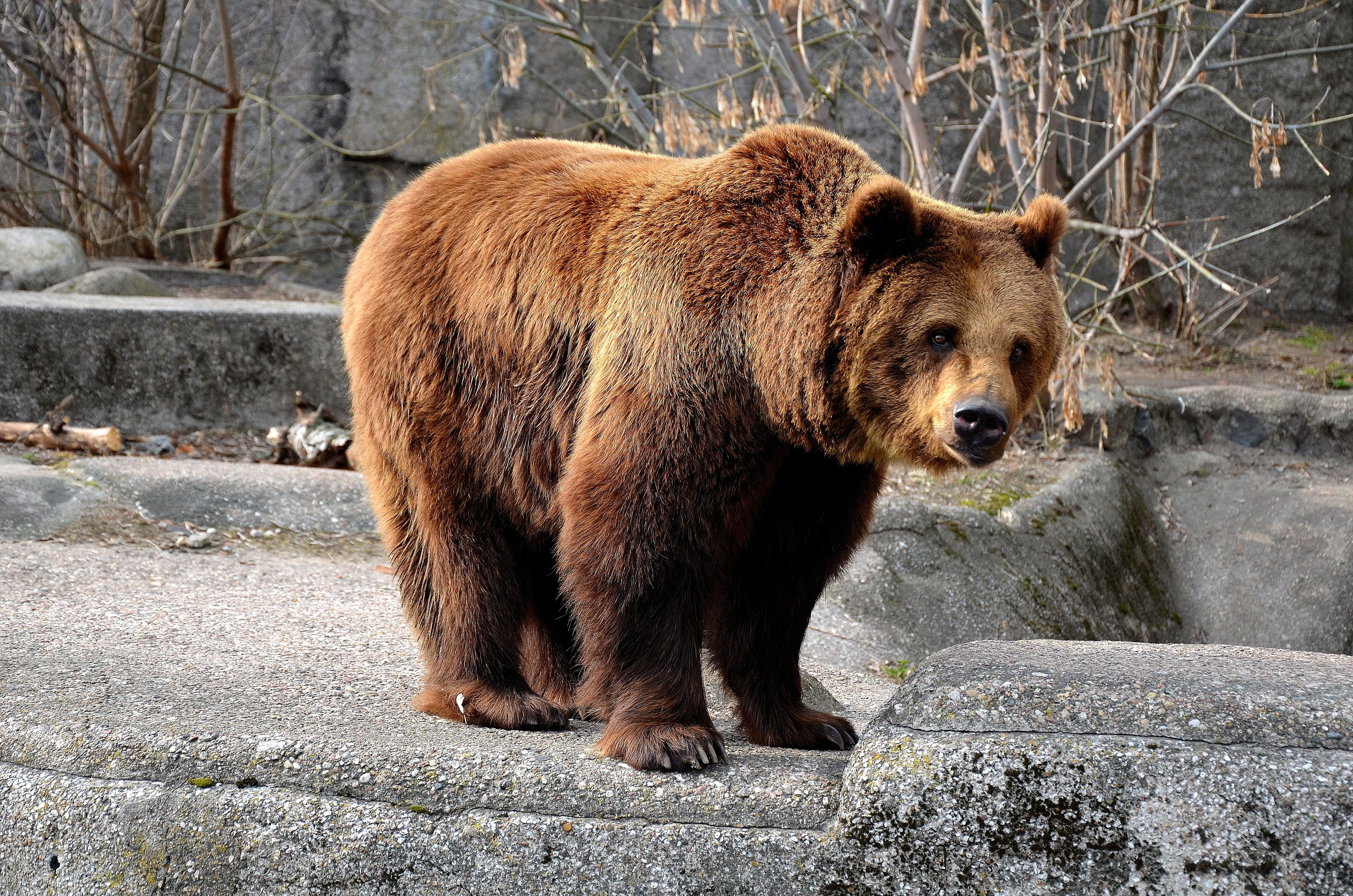
Brown bear

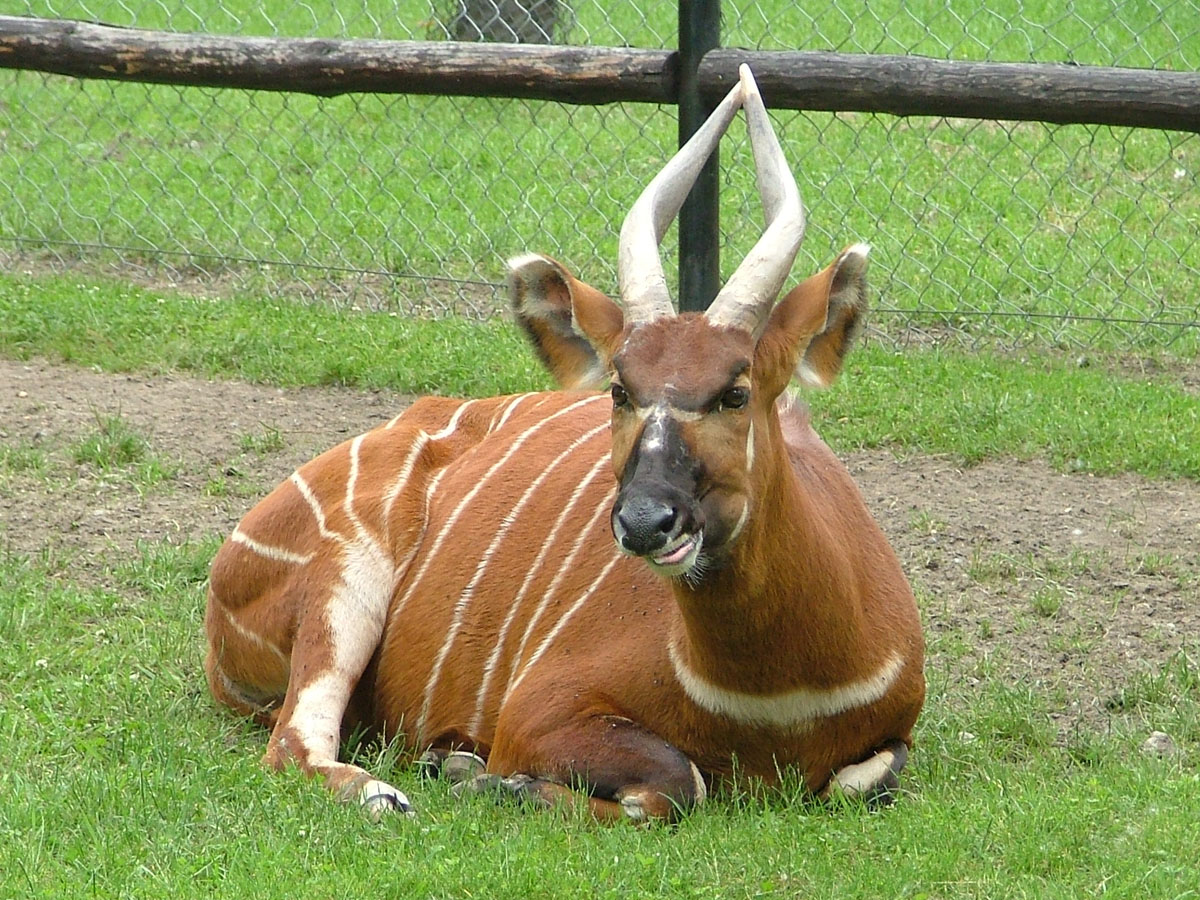
Bongo

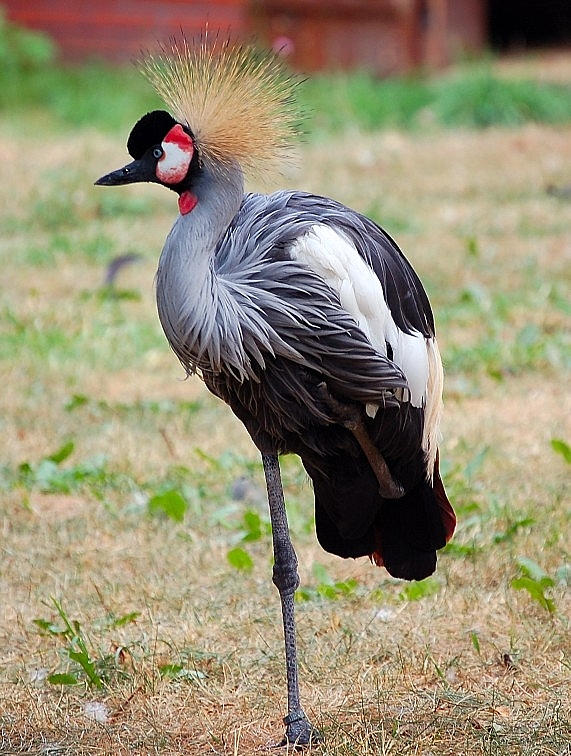
Grey crowned crane

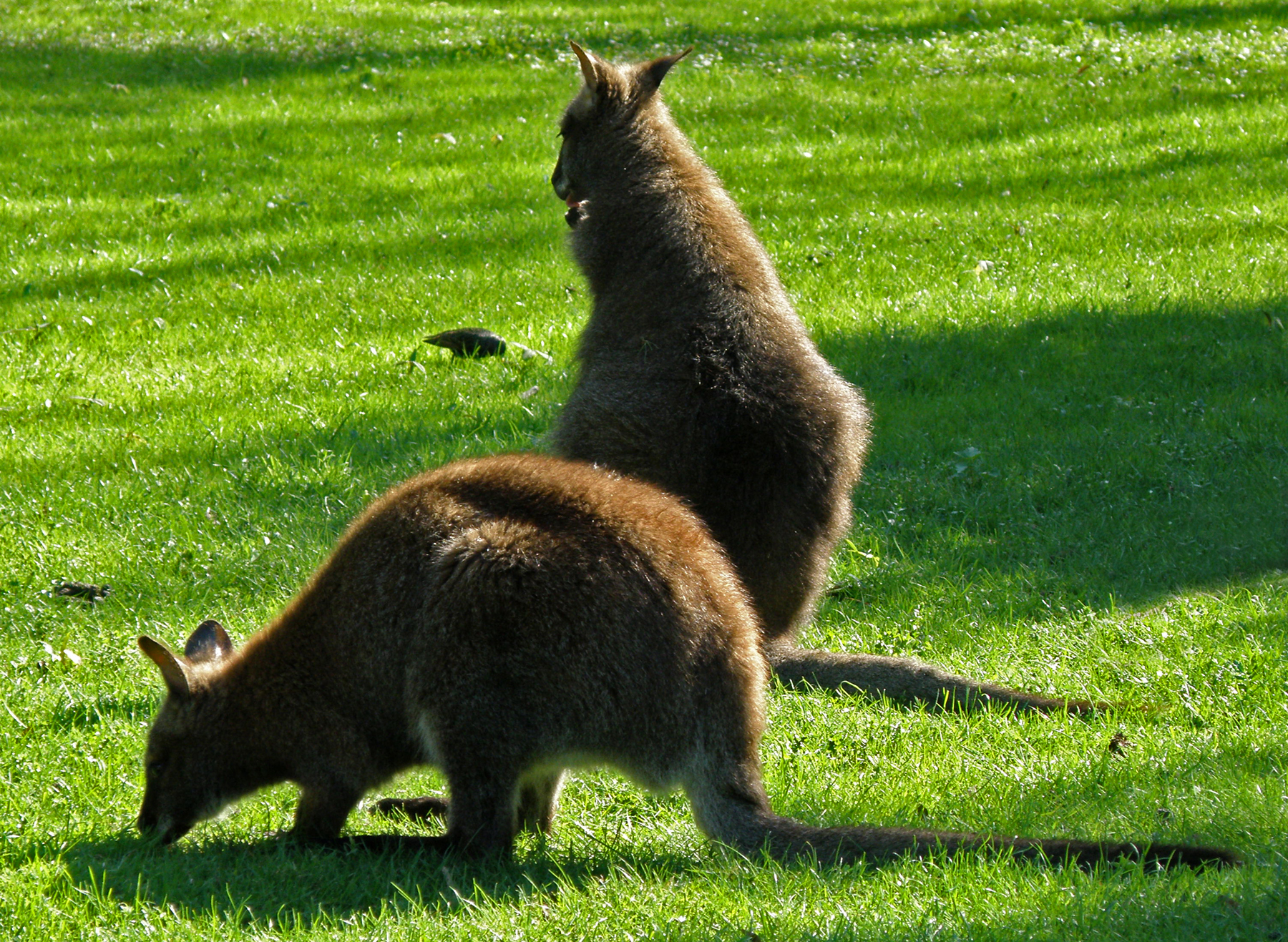
Red-necked wallaby

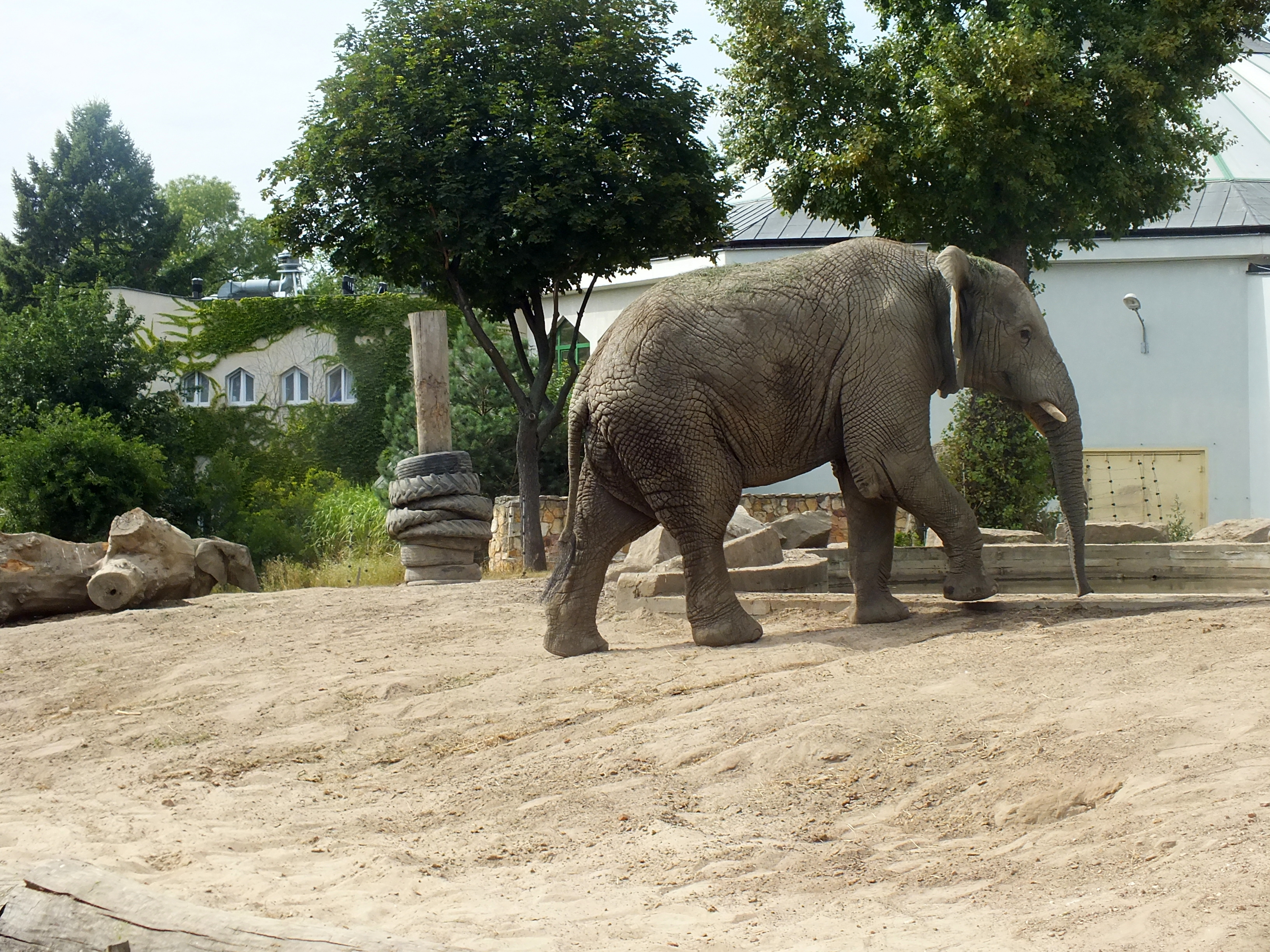
Elephant

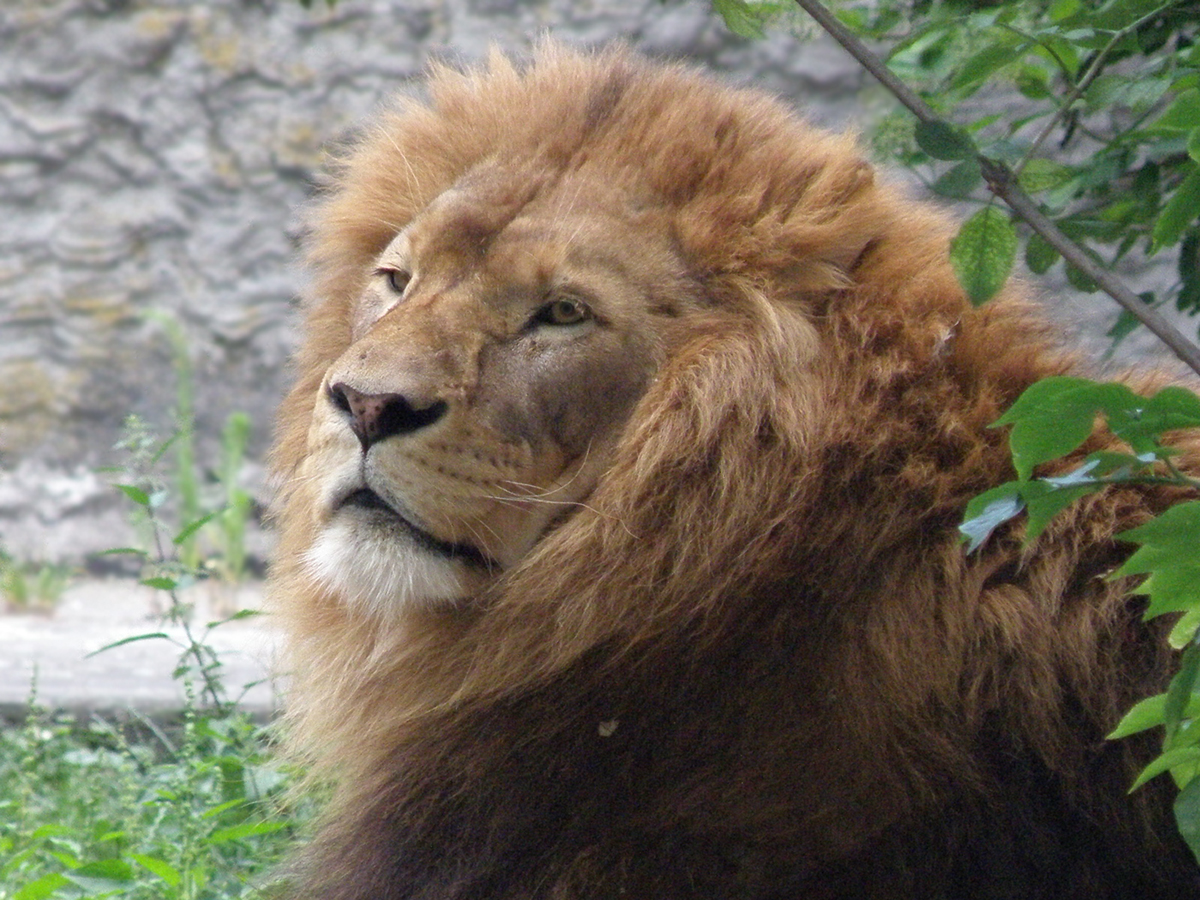
Lion

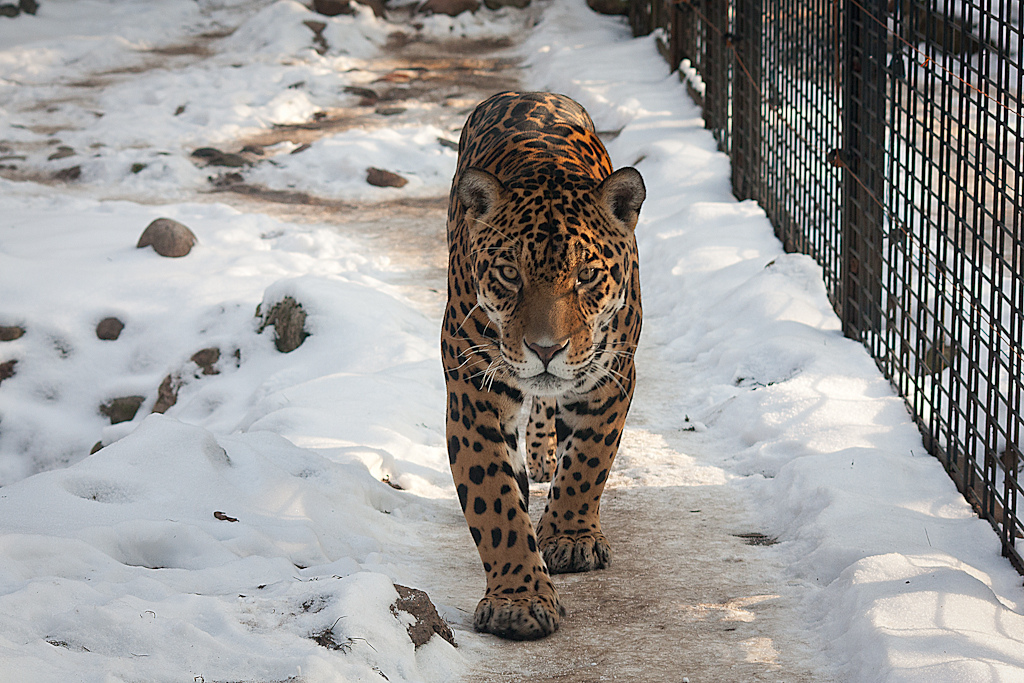
Jaguar

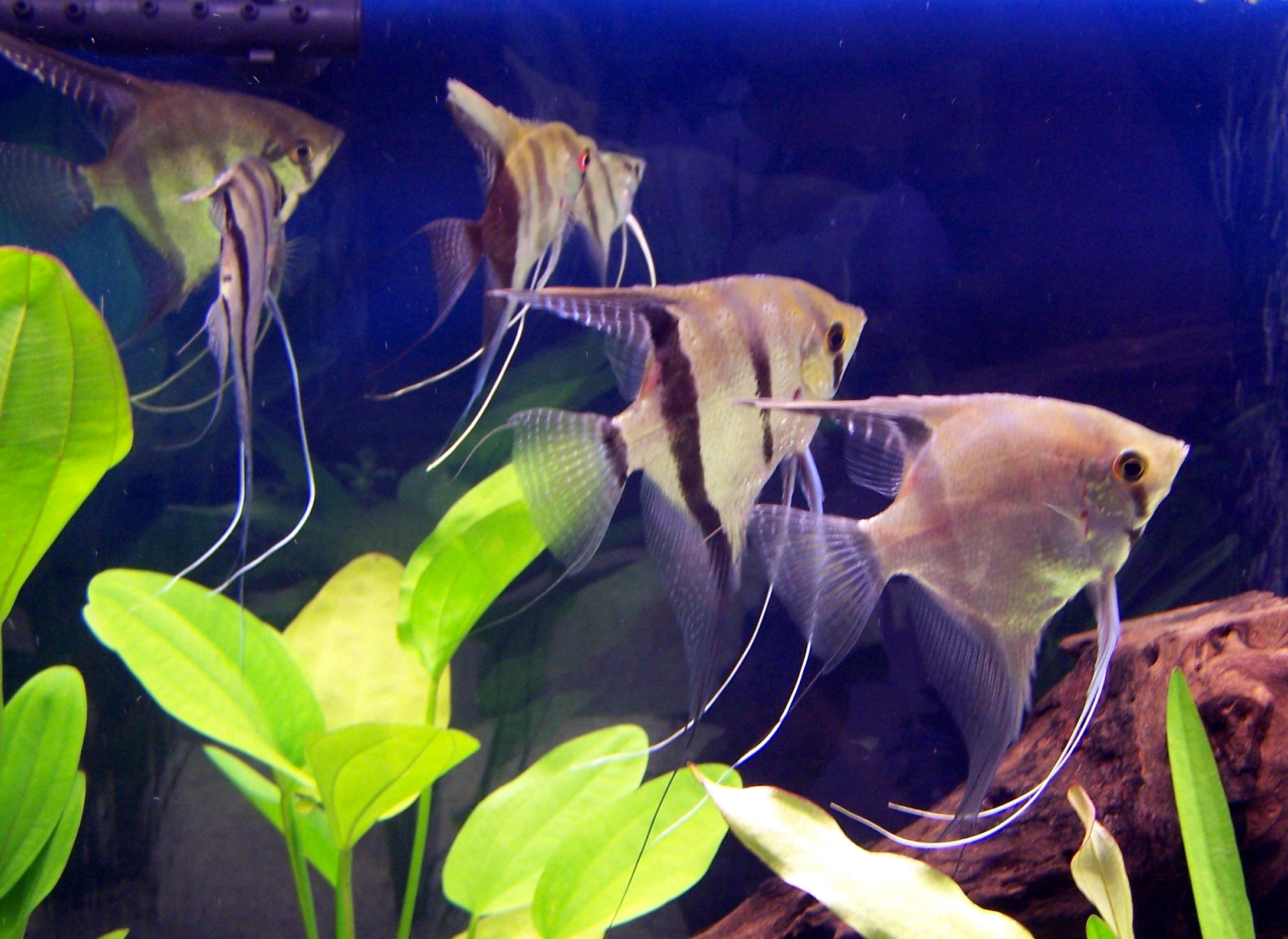
Freshwater angelfish

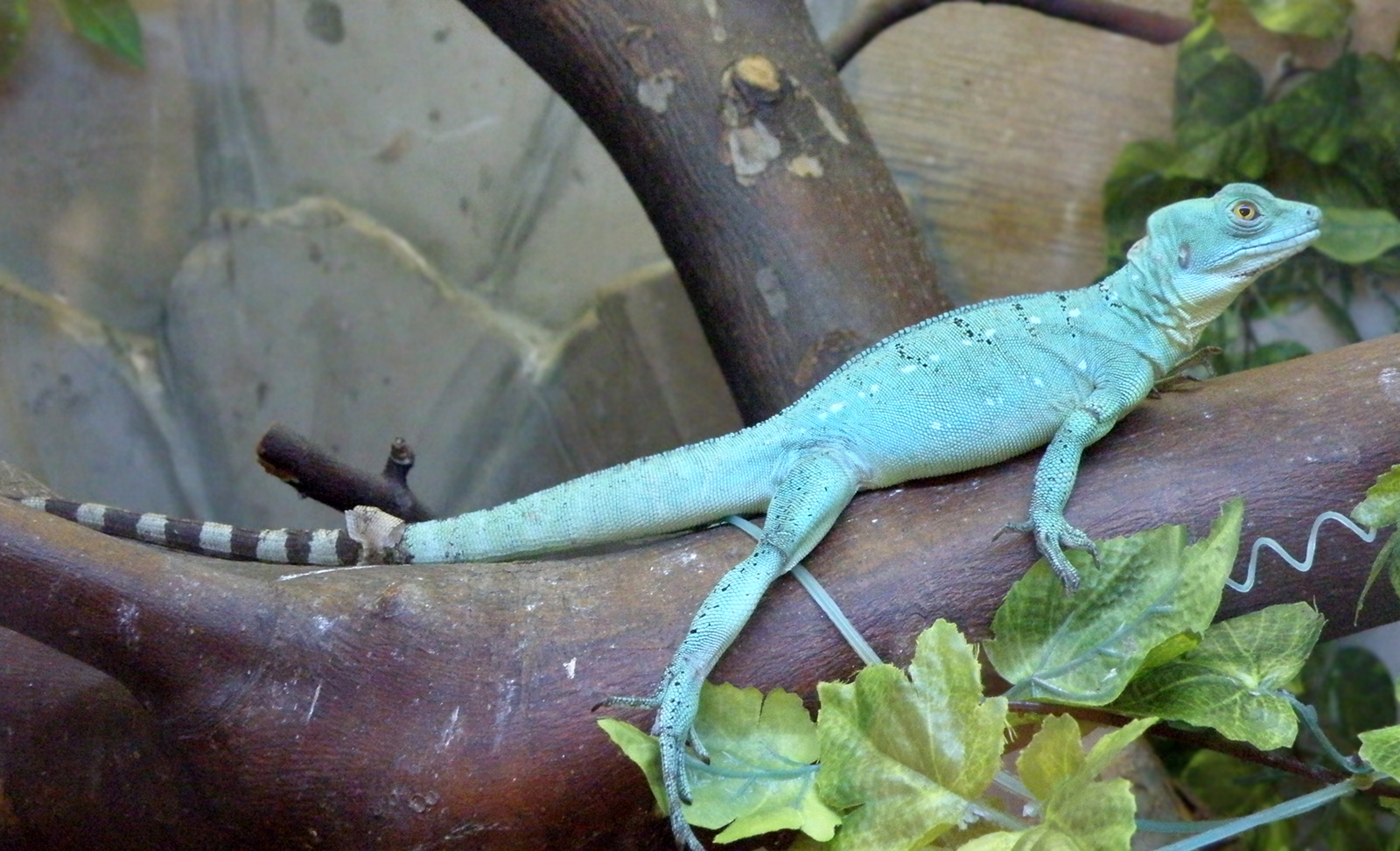
Plumed basilisk

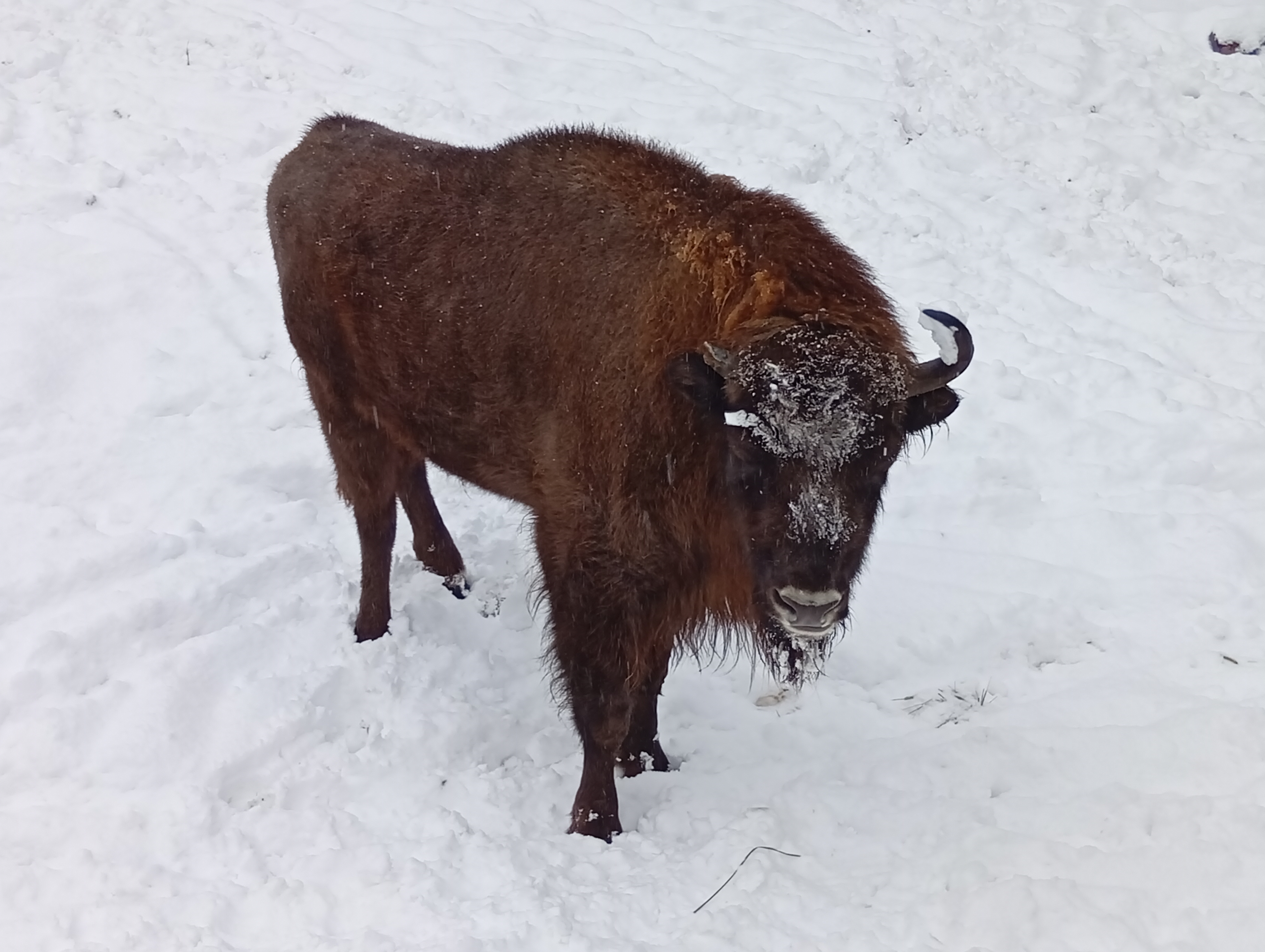
European bisons

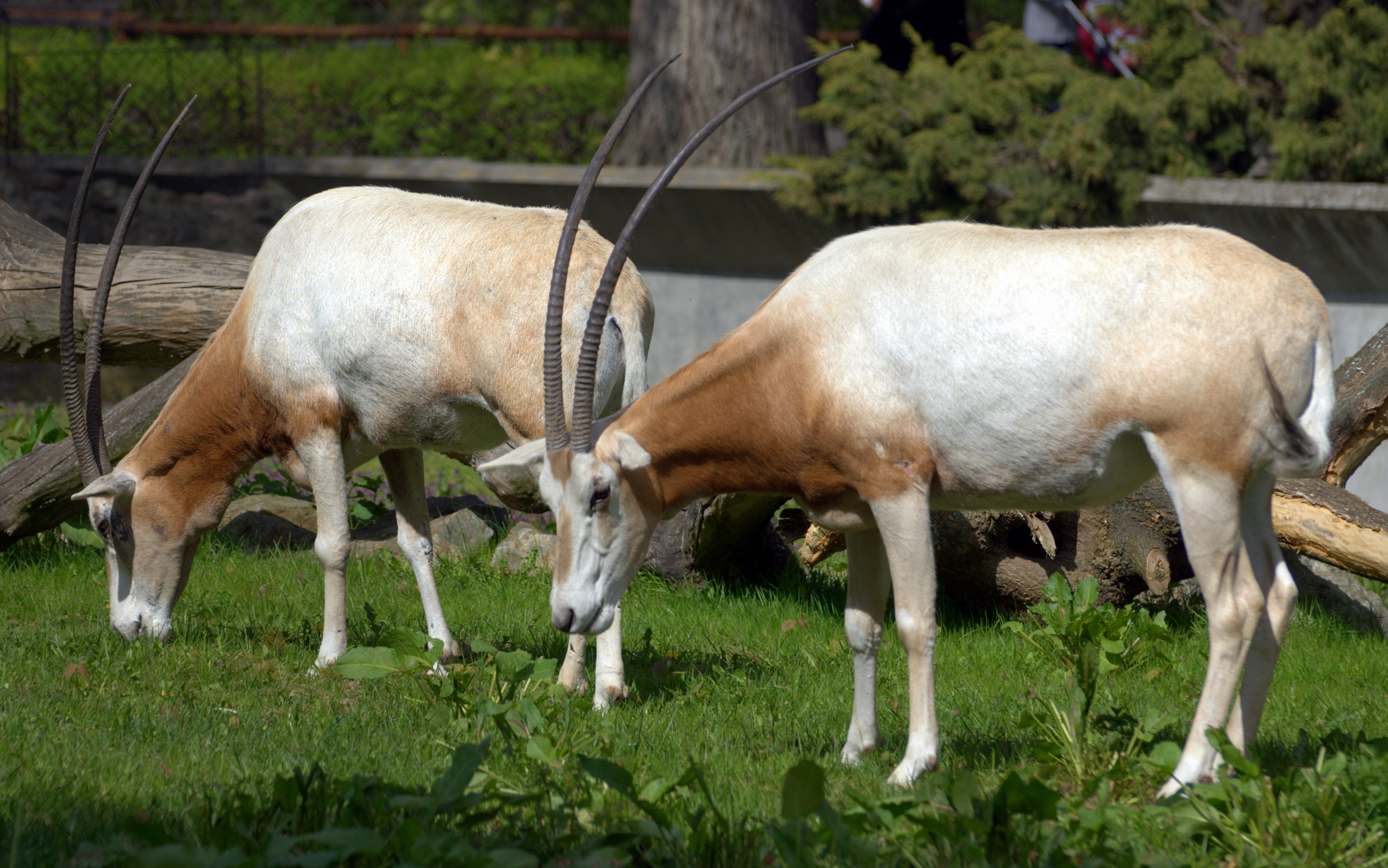
Scimitar oryx

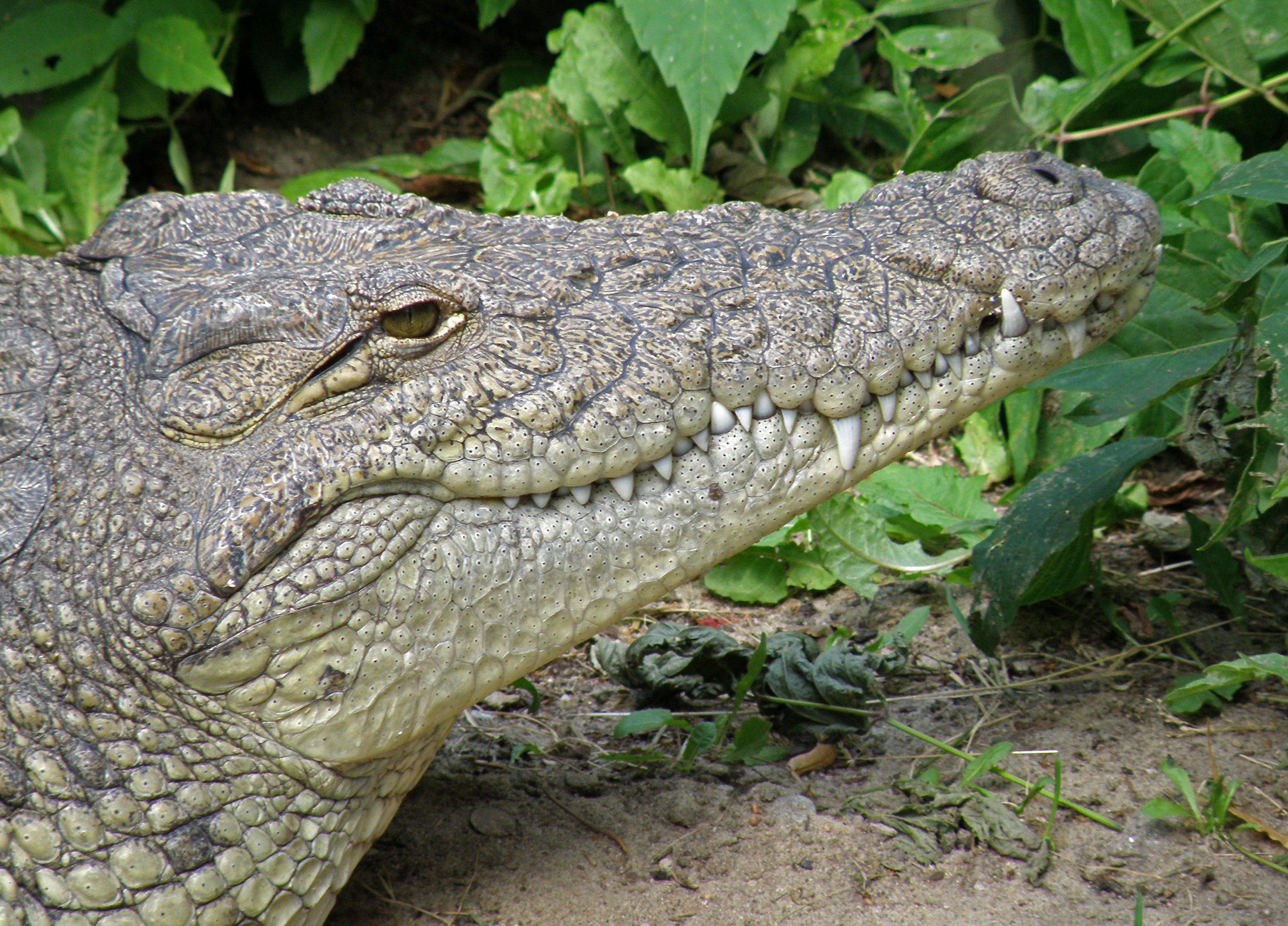
Crocodile

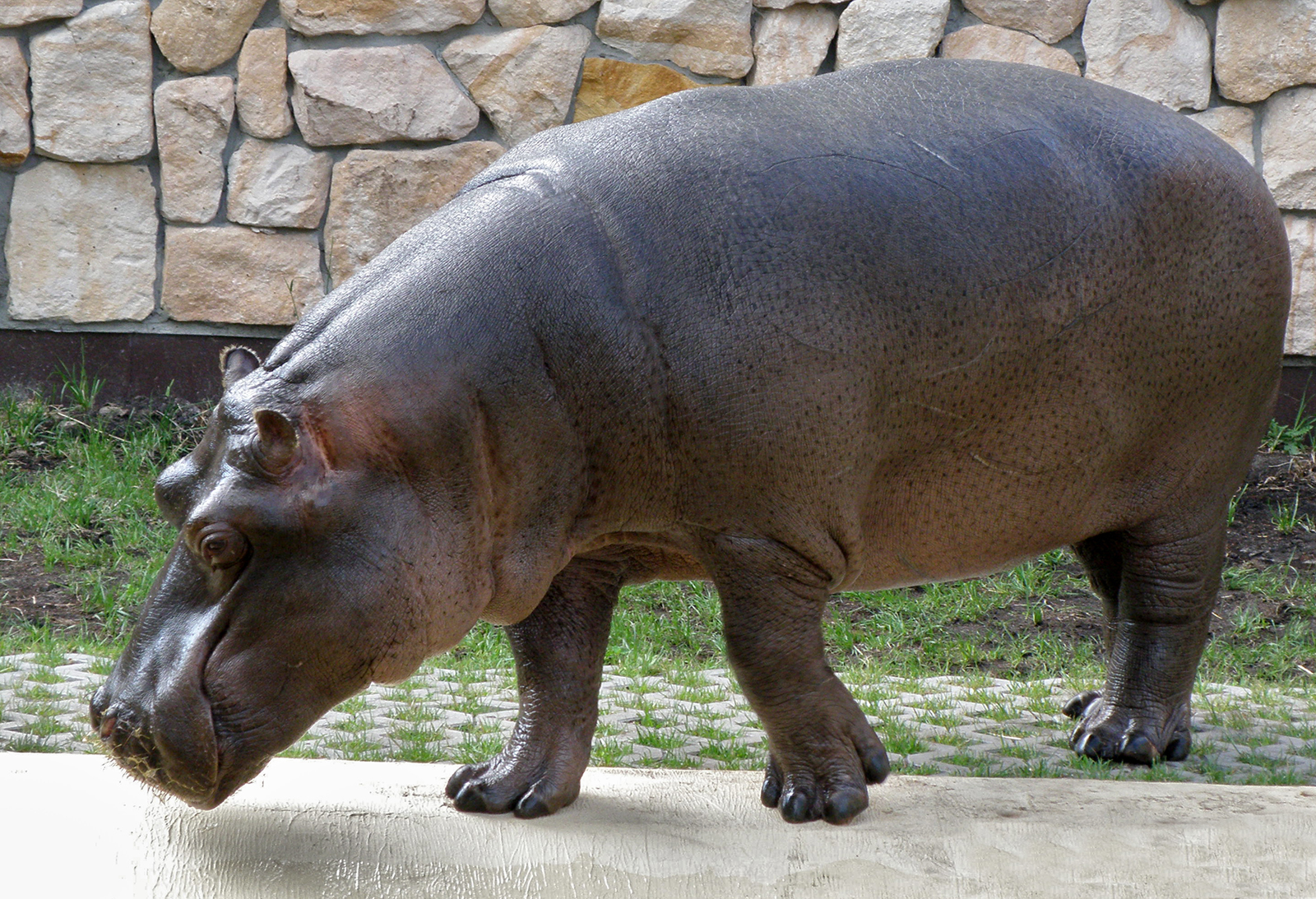
Hippopotamus

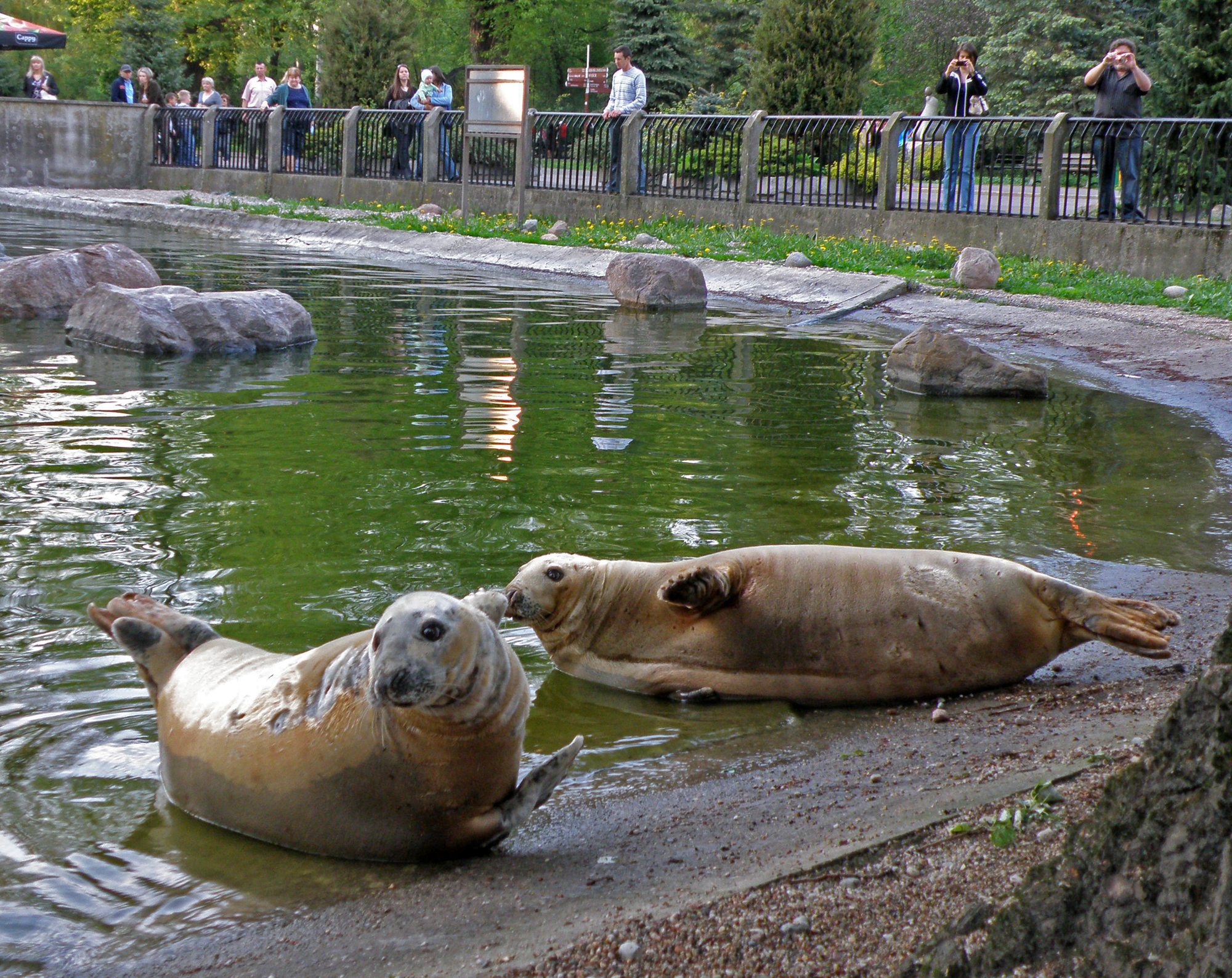
Grey seals

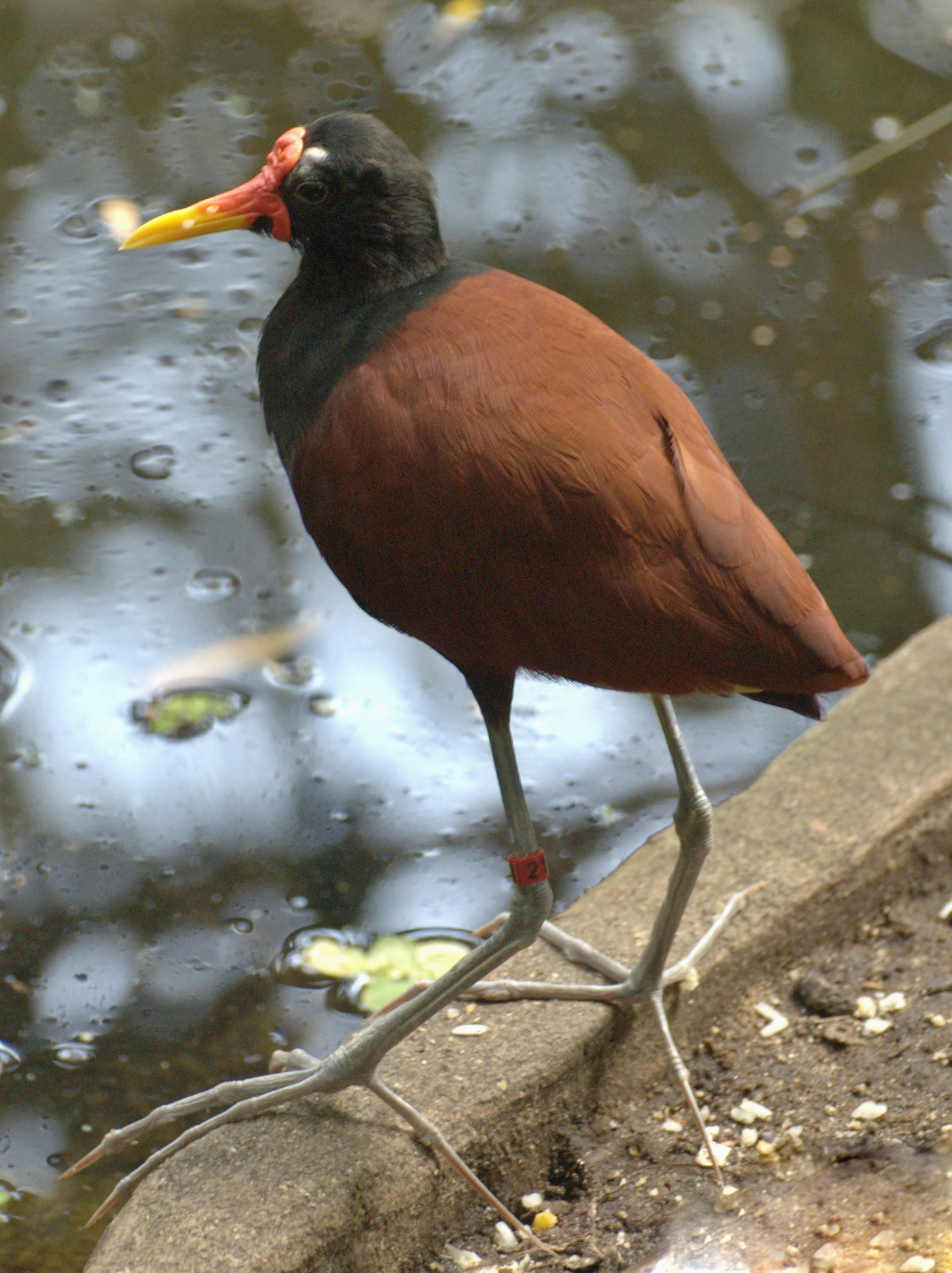
Wattled jacana

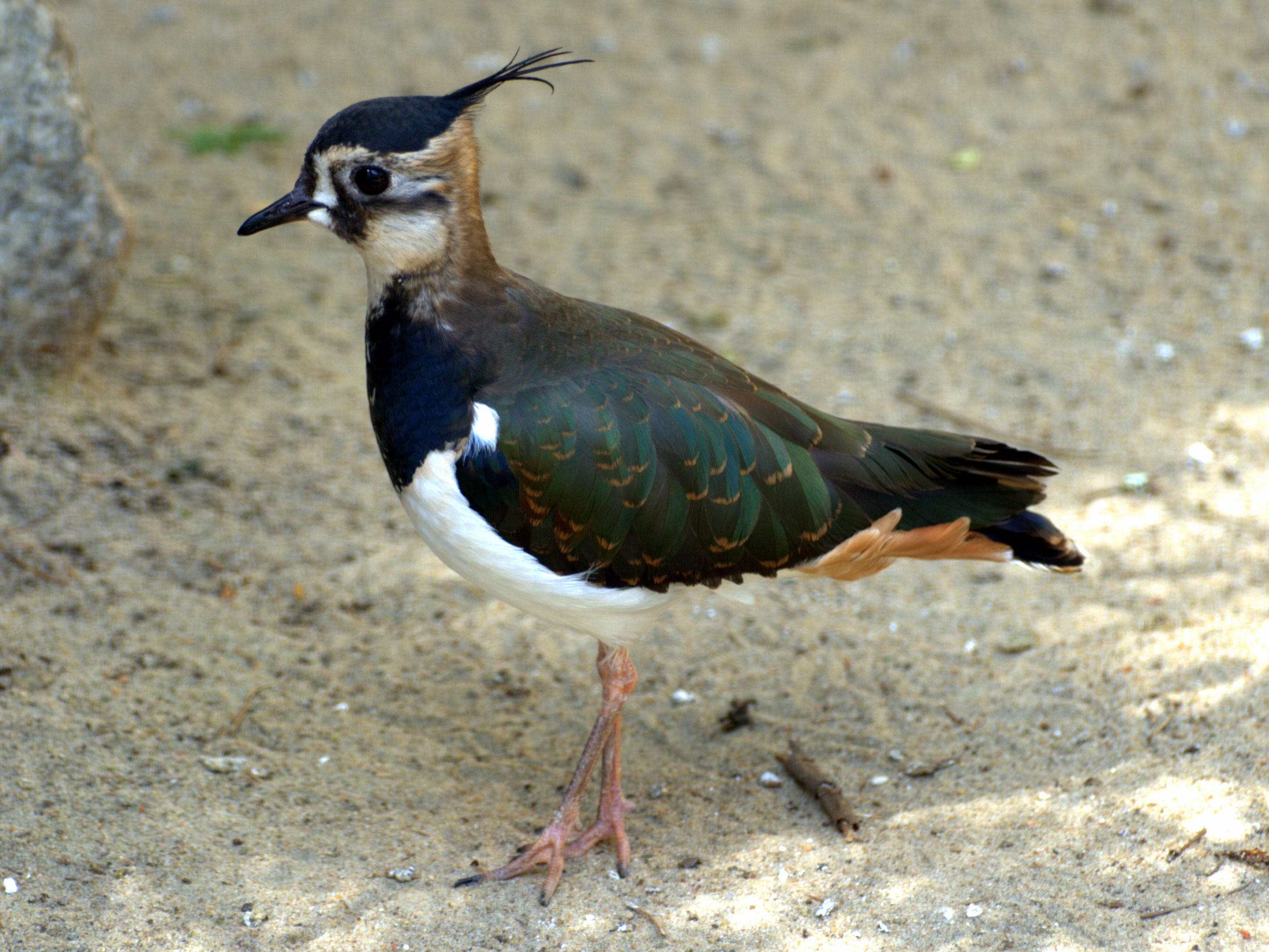
Northern lapwing

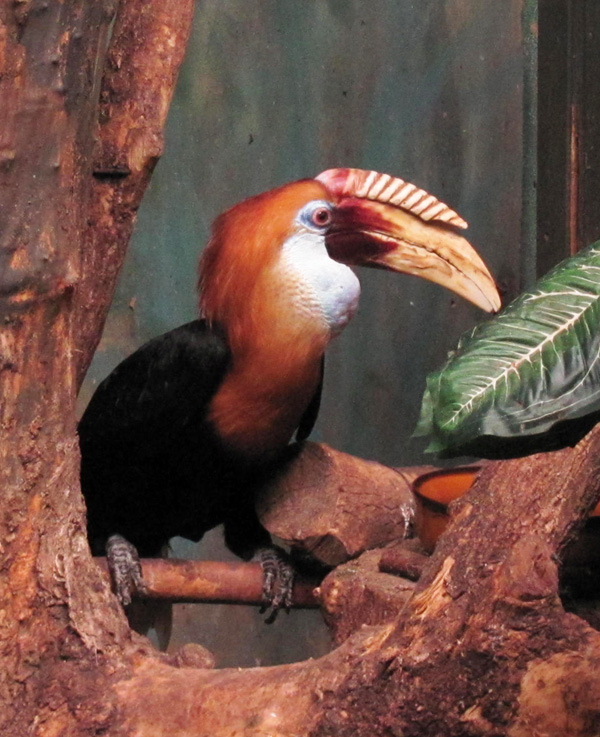
Blyth's hornbill

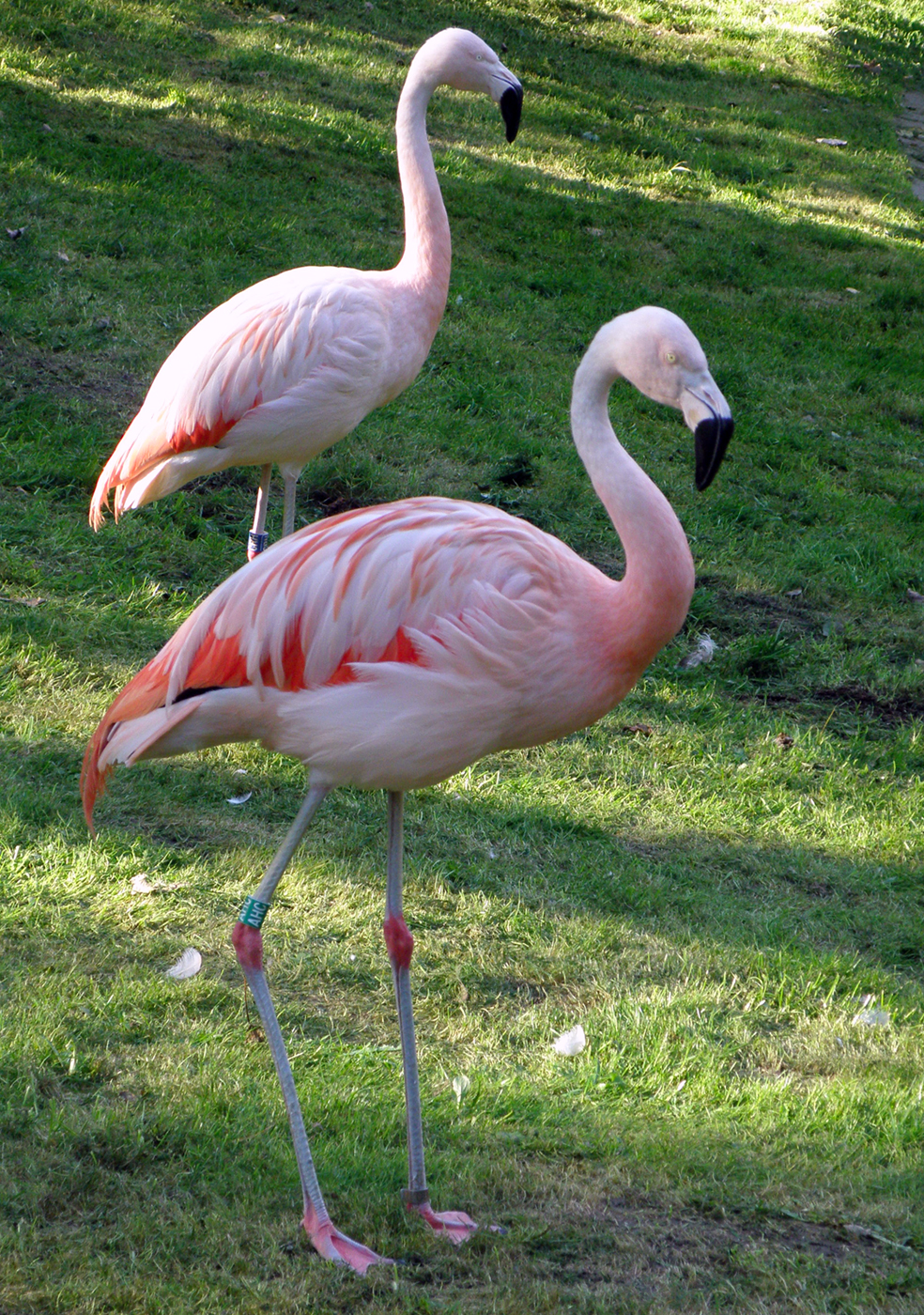
Chilean flamingoes

== See also ==
- Kraków Zoo
- Łódź Zoo
- Poznań Old Zoo
- Wrocław Zoo
