= Jan Żabiński =

Polish zoologist

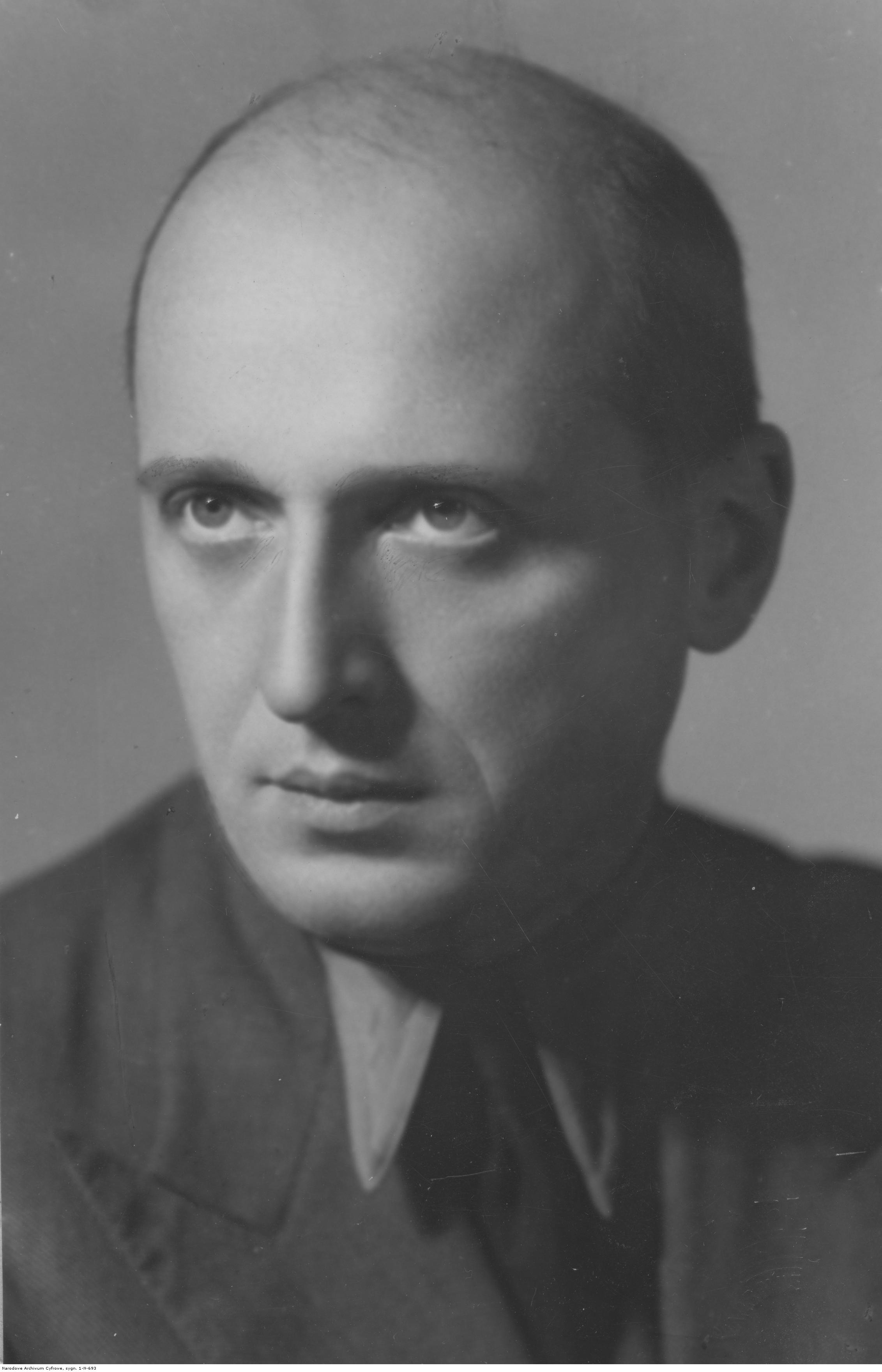
- Jan Żabiński, c. 1939
- Born: 8 April 1897; Warsaw, Congress Poland, Russian Empire
- Died: 26 July 1974 (aged 77); Warsaw, Poland
- Occupations: Educator, scientist, director of Warsaw Zoo
- Known for: Holocaust rescue

Jan Żabiński (pronounced [ˈjan ʐabiˈɲski]) (8 April 1897 – 26 July 1974) and his wife Antonina Żabińska (née Erdman) (1908–1971) were a Polish couple from Warsaw, recognized by Yad Vashem as Righteous Among the Nations for their heroic rescue of Jews during the Holocaust in Poland. Jan Żabiński was a zoologist and zootechnician by profession, a scientist, and organizer and director of the renowned Warsaw Zoo before and during World War II. He became director of the Zoo before the outbreak of war but during the occupation of Poland also held a prestigious function of the Superintendent of the city's public parks in 1939–1945. A street in Warsaw is named after him.

Jan and his wife Antonina and their son Ryszard used their personal villa and the zoo itself to shelter hundreds of displaced Jews. Additionally, Jan fought during the Warsaw Uprising, was subsequently injured and became a prisoner of war. After his liberation Żabiński became a member of the State Commission for the Preservation of Nature (Państwowa Rada Ochrony Przyrody). Jan Żabiński authored approximately 60 popular science books. His wife Antonina authored several children’s books written from the perspective of animals.

== Life ==
Jan Żabiński was born in Warsaw, the son of Józef Żabiński and his wife Helena née Strzeszewska who taught him the love of animals. Jan joined the nascent Polish Army in 1919 and took part in the Polish–Soviet War of 1920, for which he was awarded his first Cross of Valour.

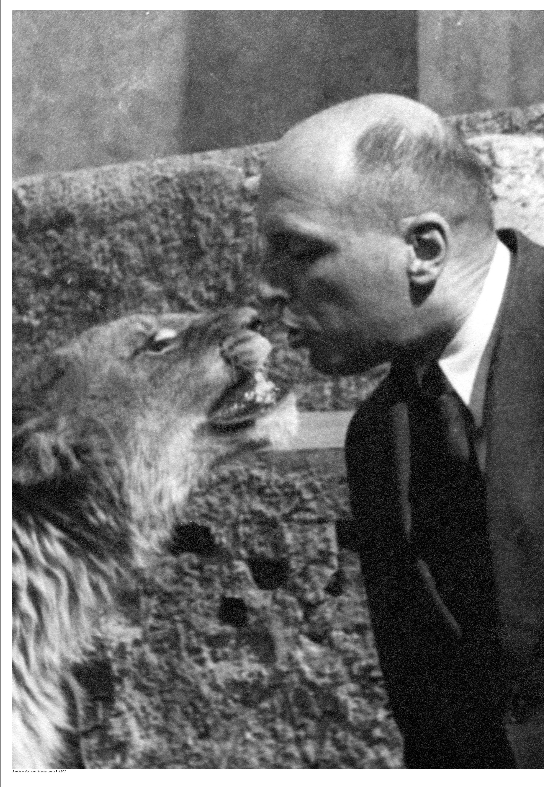
Jan Żabiński with a lion, unknown date

In the reconstituted sovereign Poland of the interwar period, Żabiński became an agricultural engineer with the Doctoral Degree in Zoology. He was employed at the Institute of Zoology and Physiology of Animals of the Warsaw University of Life Sciences (SGGW), and met Antonina Erdman, his future wife there. He was the co-founder of the Warsaw Zoo, and served as its director for a decade from 1929 until the German invasion of Poland in 1939. He also taught geography at the private Kreczmar Secondary (pl). In 1937 Żabiński supervised the birth of "Tuzinka", the 12th elephant ever born in captivity. After the liberation of Poland in 1945, he soon resumed his position of the Warsaw Zoo director, and served there until March 1951. For his Holocaust rescue, he was posthumously awarded the Commander's Cross of the Order of Polonia Restituta with the Star, by President Lech Kaczyński in 2008. His wife Antonina was also awarded the Commander's Cross.

=== Polish underground activities ===
Following the German takeover of Warsaw in September 1939, Żabiński, a Zoo director, was appointed by the new Nazi administration as the superintendent of the public parks as well. An employee of the Warsaw municipality, he was allowed to enter the Warsaw Ghetto officially, when the ghetto was founded in 1940. Jan and his wife Antonina began helping their many Jewish friends right away. Availing himself of the opportunity to visit the Warsaw ghetto ostensibly to inspect the state of the flora within the ghetto walls, Żabiński maintained contact with his Jewish colleagues and friends from before the invasion, helped them escape and find shelter on the "Aryan" side of the city. Among the many Jews he saved were sculptor Magdalena Gross with her husband Maurycy Paweł Fraenkel, writer Rachela Auerbach, Regina and Samuel Kenigswein with children, Eugenia Sylkes, Marceli Lewi-Łebkowski with family, Marysia Aszerówna, the Keller family, Professor Ludwik Hirszfeld as well as Leonia and Irena Tenenbaum, wife and daughter of entomologist Szymon Tenenbaum (who died in the Ghetto), as well as numerous others; most of whom survived the Holocaust and nominated him for the Righteous Award years later.

During the German air assault on Warsaw in September 1939, many animal enclosures had been emptied and the zoo specimens taken elsewhere. The Żabińskis decided to utilize the clean pens, cages, and stalls as the hiding places for fleeing Jews. Over the course of three years, hundreds of Jews found temporary shelter in these abandoned cages on the eastern bank of the Vistula River until finding refuge elsewhere. In addition, close to a dozen Jews were sheltered in Żabiński's two-story private home on the zoo's grounds. In this dangerous undertaking he was helped by his wife, Antonina, a recognized author, and their young son, Ryszard, who nourished and looked after the needs of the many distraught Jews in their care. At first, Żabiński paid from his own funds to subsidize the maintenance costs; then money was received through Żegota: Council to Aid Jews.

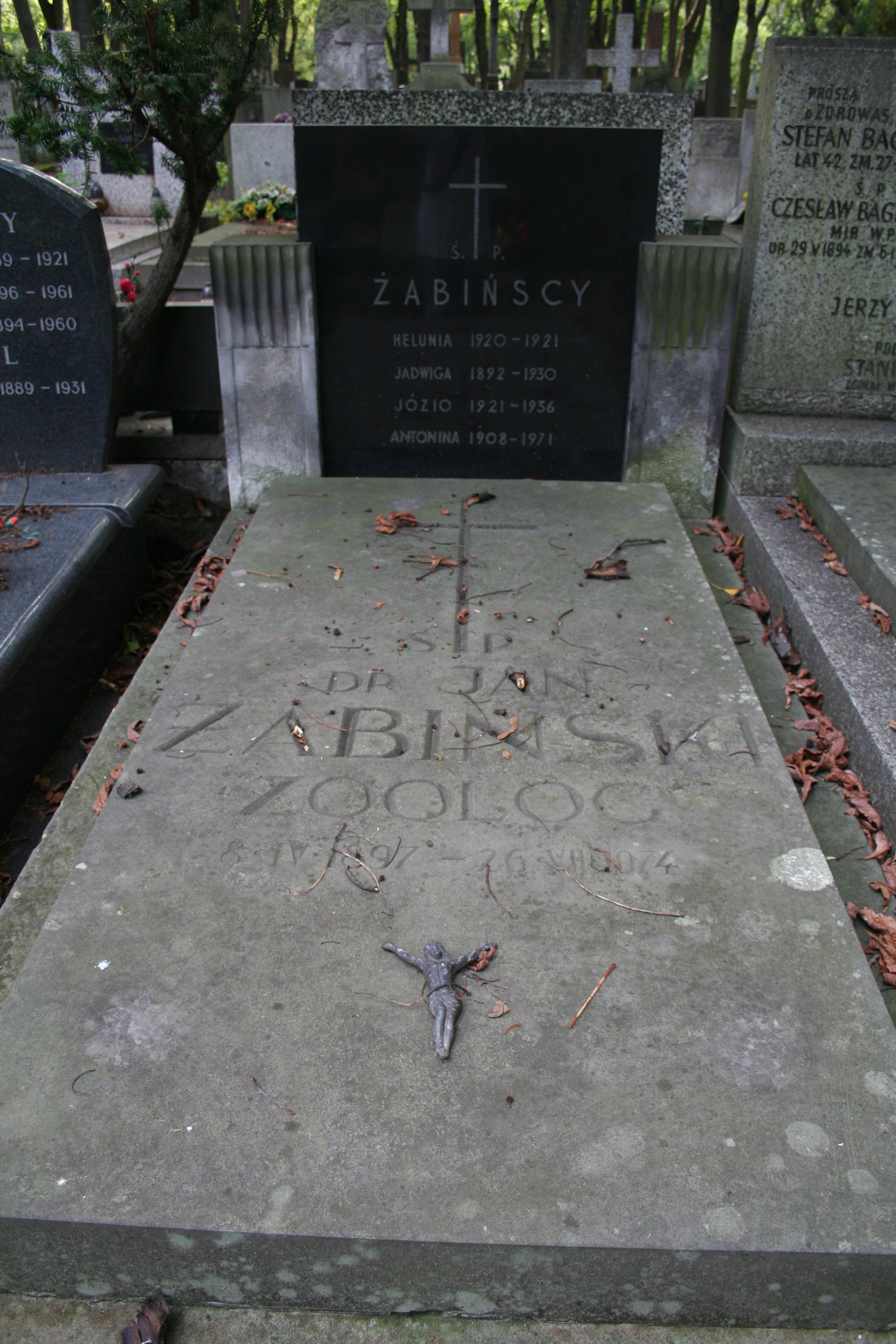
Tomb of the Żabiński family at the historical Powązki Cemetery, Warsaw

An active member of the Polish underground resistance movement Armia Krajowa (the Home Army) in the rank of lieutenant, Żabiński participated in the Warsaw Polish Uprising in August and September 1944. Upon its suppression, he was taken as a prisoner to camps in Germany. His wife continued their work, looking after the needs of some of the Jews left behind in the ruins of the city.

== Legacy ==
For this Jan and his wife received the Righteous Among the Nations award in 1965. On October 30, 1968, a tree planting ceremony was held at Yad Vashem honoring them.

In 2007, an American poet and writer Diane Ackerman published The Zookeeper's Wife, a book about the Żabiński family's wartime activities that draws upon Antonina Żabińska's diary. The Polish film director Maciej Dejczer announced in 2008 that he had plans for a film about Żabiński's wartime activities.

A war drama about the Żabiński couple based on the book by Ackerman, The Zookeeper's Wife, was filmed in 2015 and released on March 31, 2017, with American actress Jessica Chastain portraying Antonina and Belgian actor Johan Heldenbergh cast as Jan.
