= Billy Woodberry =

American film director

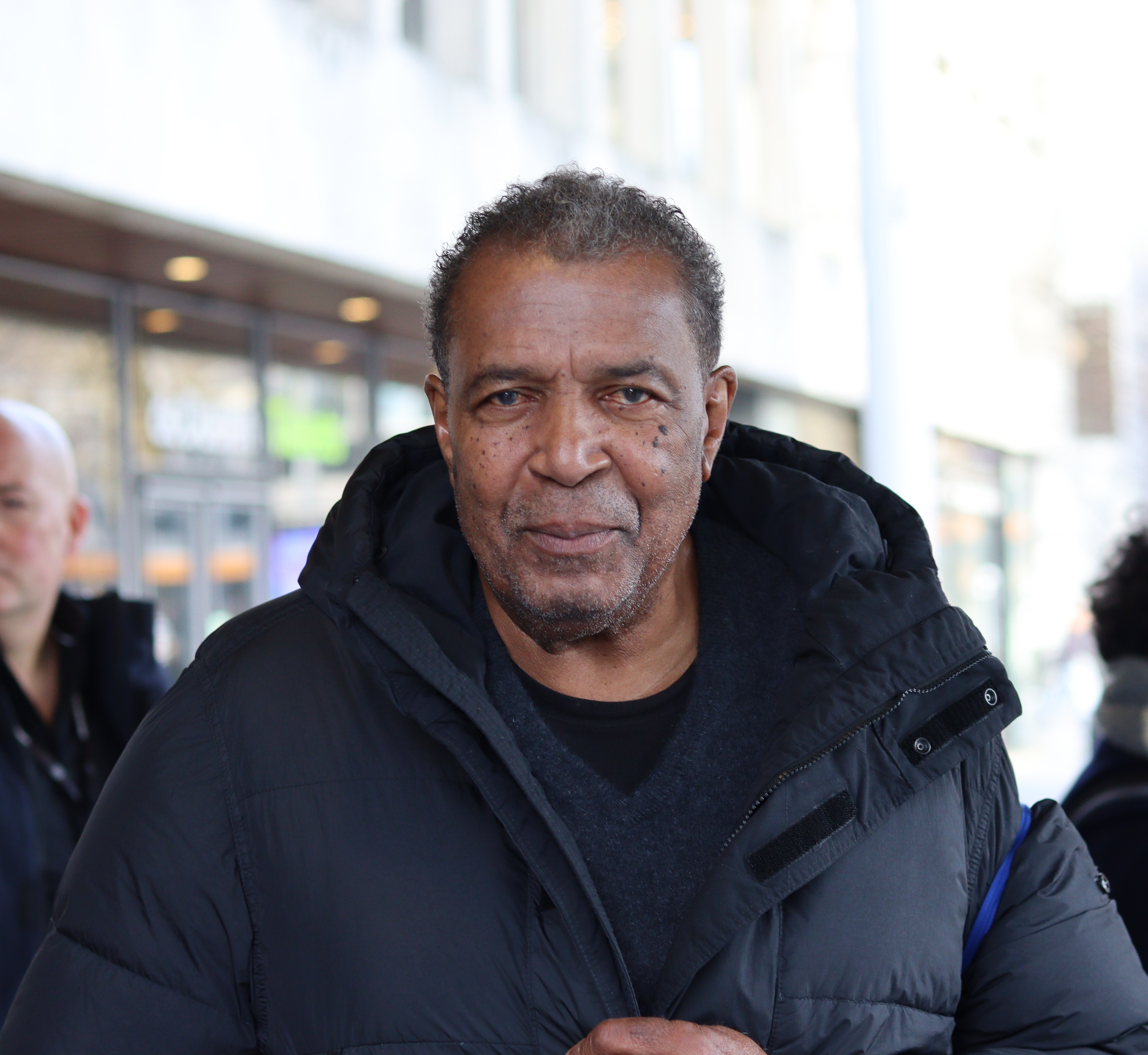
- Woodberry at the 53rd International Film Festival Rotterdam in 2024
- Born: 1950 (age 75–76); Dallas, Texas, US
- Education: UCLA (MFA, 1982)
- Occupation: Film director
- Years active: 1979–present

Billy Woodberry (born 1950) is one of the leading directors of the L.A. Rebellion (also known as the Los Angeles School of Black Filmmakers). He is best known for directing the feature film, Bless Their Little Hearts (1984), which was honored at the Berlin International Film Festival.

== Background ==
Woodberry was born in Dallas, Texas. In the 1970s, he enrolled at the University of California, Los Angeles (UCLA) Film School, where he produced and directed his earliest films.

=== UCLA Film School ===
During his time at UCLA, Woodberry was a part of a Black Independent Film Movement, commonly referred to as the L.A. Rebellion. The Movement consisted of a generation of young African and African-American filmmakers who studied at the UCLA Film School in the late 1960s through the late 1980s. These independent filmmakers created a Black Cinema that provided an alternative to classical Hollywood cinema. The political and social discourse of 1967 and 1968 were vital in the establishment of this movement in filmmaking that would later be called the L.A. Rebellion. This term was coined by film scholar Clyde Taylor, and the movement sought for a new aesthetic and mode of representation and narration that spoke to the realities of black existence. The films produced by this group of filmmakers were significantly relevant to the politics and culture of the 1960s. Woodberry's film Bless Their Little Hearts illustrates this in its examination of the tensions caused by class conflicts within an African American family. His film, along with those of Julie Dash, Haile Gerima, Charles Burnett, and numerous others, helped to create narratives that spoke to the black experience. Critics have compared the films of the movement to Italian Neorealism films of the 1940s, Third World Cinema films of the late 1960s and 1970s, and the 1990s Iranian New Wave.

== Film career ==
Billy Woodberry's earliest works include his UCLA student films The Pocketbook (1980) and Bless Their Little Hearts (1984). Woodberry's short film The Pocketbook explores concepts of loneliness, as an abandoned child is forced to confront his situation after a botched robbery. Adapted from Langston Hughes short story "Thank You, Ma’am," the film follows as the young boy reflects on his life, and reevaluates his decisions. The Pocketbook was released in 1980, and was dedicated to modernist photographers such as Paul Strand and Helen Levitt. Drawing on their legacy, the film consists of high contrast black and white photography that “draws on the history of photography as a social practice.” The original film was restored from its 16mm black and white negative and is held in the UCLA Film and Television Archive.

Woodberry has appeared in Charles Burnett's When It Rains (1995) and Haile Gerima's Ashes to Embers (1982). He has provided narration for films such as Thom Andersen's Red Hollywood (1996) and James Benning's Four Corners (1998).

== Major films ==
=== Bless Their Little Hearts (1984) ===
Woodberry's feature film Bless Their Little Hearts was his master's thesis film at UCLA, and is based on a screenplay written by Charles Burnett. Played by Nate Hardman and Kaycee Moore, the film's lead protagonist, Charlie and Andais Banks, grapple with financial hardships and constant stressors in their marriage. Throughout the film the couple struggle to make ends meet, as Charlie struggles to find a job and Andais works to provide for the family. In many ways, the film addresses universal problems and occurrences that speak to socio-cultural effects of mass unemployment.

=== And when I die, I won't stay dead (2015) ===
Woodberry's latest film And when I die, I won't stay dead is a documentary about the life and work of the poet Bob Kaufman. The film had its world premiere in Vienna and was presented at the opening night of MoMa's Doc Fortnight in 2016. In this film Woodberry continues to address some of his major themes such as institutional wrongdoing (Kaufman ended up at Bellevue Hospital, where he was subjected to shock treatment); a close evocation of setting (North Beach scene in San Francisco) and the profound presentation of a complex, drifting character.

== Filmography ==
- The Pocketbook Director, Editor, Writer, 1980, Short Film
- Ashes and Embers, Actor, 1982
- Bless Their Little Hearts, Director, 1984, Feature Film
- When It Rains, Actor, 1995, Short Film
- Red Hollywood, Narrator, 1996, Documentary
- Spirits of Rebellion: Black Film at UCLA, Himself, 2011, Documentary
- And when I die, I won't stay dead, Director, 2015
- A Story from Africa, Director, 2019, Documentary Short
- Mário, Director, 2024, Documentary Feature

== Critical reception ==
Bless Their Little Hearts received the Interfilm ecumenical jury award at the Berlin Film Festival.

Vincent Canby of The New York Times said that the film "works beautifully."

"Its poetry lies in the exaltation of ordinary detail" is how Jim Ridley of the Village Voice described Bless Their Little Hearts in his 2008 review of the film.

Bless Their Little Hearts was selected in 2013 by the National Film Registry to be included for preservation, deeming it culturally, historically, and aesthetically significant.
