= And when I die, I won't stay dead =

2015 documentary film

And when I die, I won't stay dead is a documentary film about the life and work of African-American poet Bob Kaufman, directed by Billy Woodberry which was shown at International Film Festival Rotterdam in 2015, opened MoMa's Doc Fortnight in 2016 and won the award for Best Investigative Documentary at Doclisboa International Film Festival in 2015.

== Synopsis ==
A journey into the life and work of beat poet and activist Bob Kaufman and his insistence that poetry is fundamental to humanity's moral survival.

== Screenings ==
- Doclisboa, 2015
- Vienna International Film Festival, 2015
- International Film Festival Rotterdam, 2016
- MoMa's Doc Fortnight, New York 2016
- San Francisco International Film Festival, 2016
- Harvard Film Archive, 2016

== Reviews ==
Ernst Hardy wrote at the Crave Online that " Woodberry's fully fleshed out depiction of the larger cultural, social and political canvases against which Kaufman lived and railed." Neil Young from the Hollywood Reporter called the film a "Conscientious tribute to a wayward soul."
