= Ninth Street (film) =

1999 film directed by Kevin Willmott

- Theatrical poster
- Directed by: Tim Rebman
- Written by: Kevin Willmott
- Produced by: Kevin Willmott
- Starring: Don Washington; Kevin Willmott
- Cinematography: Troy Paddock
- Edited by: Mike Brandt
- Music by: Kriss Avery
- Distributed by: Ideal Enterprises
- Release date: 1999
- Running time: 95 minutes
- Country: United States
- Language: English

Ninth Street is a 1999 American drama film shot in black-and-white. It was directed by Tim Rebman and written by Kevin Willmott.

Filmed in the United States, the movie was primarily released in English.

== Plot ==
Set in 1968 Junction City, Kansas (sometimes called "Junk Town"), the film reflects on the history of "East Ninth Street" during the 1940s when famous jazz musicians played the nightclubs. In 1968, the area has deteriorated into strip clubs and cheap bars where Vietnam War draftees from nearby Fort Riley stop and drink. People in the group include a drunk (Don Washington) who lost a leg in World War II, a taxi dispatcher (Isaac Hayes), a saloon owner (Queen Bey), and a crazy bag lady (Kaycee Moore). Carrie Mae (Nadine Griffith) is trying to get out of the business, but is forced to work by a malicious boyfriend (Byron Myrick) and has to provide for her baby. Martin Sheen also stars as a white preacher who likes the people in the area better than his own congregation.

== Cast ==
- Don Washington as Bebo
- Kevin Willmott as Huddie
- Nadine Griffith as Carrie Mae
- Queen Bey as Mama Butler
- Byron Myrick as Love
- Isaac Hayes as Tippytoe
- Martin Sheen as Father Frank
- Debra Washington as Biscuit
- Kaycee Moore as Pop-Bottle Ruby
- Arthur Blythe as Charlie Parker

== Production ==
Production on Ninth Street took five to ten years to complete. Wilmott began writing the script as a class assignment for film school; he drew upon stories his parents and their friends told him about Ninth Street in Junction City, Kansas and wrote the script as a stage play. Wilmott had initially approached several venues in Hollywood to make the film but was turned away. He ended up making the film in Kansas City, Missouri, after returning to the city and achieving some success there. Isaac Hayes and Martin Sheen were confirmed as performing in the film; Ninth Street also marked the last film role of Kaycee Moore.

== Release ==
Ninth Street premiered on June 5, 1998 at the Gem Theater in Kansas City, Missouri. The film was given a screening at the Beach Museum of Art in 2005 as part of Kansas State University's Fusion Week: A Prairie View.

== Reception ==
Variety reviewed the film, calling it "an earnest effort that's compromised by inexperienced direction and nonexistent production values." Thomas Fox Averill covered Ninth Street for the Center of Kansas Studies at Washburn University, noting that it "resonates with the transitions faced by many Kansas communities. " In an interview with Wilmott, Jeff Loeb stated that "Through the film Willmott advocates a return to a sense of selfhelp and mutual dependency necessary to the salvation of the black community, a somewhat more conservative message than is normally seen in contemporary African American films. "

The reviewer for Video Business rated the movie favorably, citing it as a "richly textured recreation of Junction City in the late '60s".
