= My Brother's Wedding =

1983 film by Charles Burnett

- Directed by: Charles Burnett
- Written by: Charles Burnett
- Produced by: Charles Burnett; Gaye Shannon-Burnett
- Starring: Everett Silas; Jessie Holmes; Gaye Shannon-Burnett
- Cinematography: Charles Burnett
- Edited by: Thomas Penick
- Production company: Milestone Films
- Distributed by: Milestone Films; Les Films du Paradoxe (France)
- Release date: September 13, 1983 (Toronto)
- Running time: 76 minutes
- Country: United States
- Language: English
- Budget: $50,000 (estimated)
- Box office: $8,217 (USA)

My Brother's Wedding is a 1983 tragicomic film edited, written, produced, and directed by Charles Burnett. Set in South Central Los Angeles, the film follows Pierce Mundy (Everett Silas) who finds himself torn between incompatible loyalties after his childhood friend, Soldier (Ronnie Bell), is released from prison. When his brother Wendell (Monte Easter) decides to marry Sonia (Gaye Shannon-Burnett), who is of a higher social class, Pierce's disdain for Sonia results in misfortune.

Although the film is today praised for its tender, funny and moving portrayal of contemporary working class African American life, mishandling of the film's promotion by the producers led to a limited release of only a rough edit of the film to mixed reviews in 1983. Burnett was able to finish editing and re-release the film in 2007 to a positive critical response, although the film's theatrical run would gross less than $10,000.

== Plot ==
Pierce Mundy is a young African-American man working at his mother's dry cleaning business. He is troubled by his brother Wendell's engagement to Sonia, a privileged woman whom he thinks was "spoon-fed". He frequently bickers with his family members about his lack of direction in life, and gets into physical altercations with his father. He's also flirted with by a teenaged girl, Angela, whose advancements he frequently rebuffs. Pierce's mother warns him to behave at dinner in front of Sonia and Wendell, but they inevitably fight over their different backgrounds, with his family picking Sonia's side.

Pierce's friend, Soldier, is due to be released from jail. Soldier's parents, Mr. and Mrs. Robinson, beg Pierce to help keep him out of jail once he is released. Pierce frequents local businesses in order to help Soldier get a job, but they are uninterested in hiring him due to his reputation. Upon Soldier's release, Pierce is visited by a man previously wronged by Soldier, and threatens to kill Soldier the next time he sees him. A few days later, a man attempts to shoot Pierce and Soldier, only for his gun to be unloaded. Pierce and Soldier chase the man, with Pierce letting him go.

As Wendell and Sonia's wedding approaches, the Mundy family hosts Sonia and the Richardsons for dinner, where Pierce's mother begs him to not embarrass their family. When Mr. Richardson asks Pierce what he does for a living, Pierce becomes agitated, saying he enjoys physical labor and isn't smart enough to be a lawyer. Pierce's mother says that it would have been nice to have a doctor and a lawyer in the family like the Richardsons, but Pierce remarks that they are all crooks, insulting Mr. Richardson. Sonia brags about her recent victory in court, causing Pierce to snap at her because she'd let a murderer go free, an exchange that bitterly ends the dinner.

While working at the store, Pierce allows Soldier to have sex with a woman in the back. Pierce's mother suddenly returns to retrieve her prayer book, walking in on Soldier and his friend having sex on her laundry and prayer book. The next day, Soldier is waiting in a car for Pierce with another girl and sends Angela to go tell Pierce to hurry up. Angela refuses to relay the message to Pierce, and they leave without him. Later that night, Soldier and his friend get into a car crash and die.

When Pierce learns of Soldier's death, he runs to console the Richards family, who tell him the funeral is set for Saturday. Pierce feels obligated to help them find pallbearers, but realizes the funeral is set for the day of his brother's wedding, where he'll serve as the best man. He urges his family to change the date of the wedding, but they refuse due to his disdain of Sonia. He returns to the Richards residence, where Mr. Richards complains of the stress caused by planning the funeral and having relatives fly into town. Pierce abandons the idea of rescheduling the events, resolving to somehow attend both. On the day of the wedding, Pierce arrives late and tells his mother that he cannot serve as the best man. She angrily tells him to sit down, but he leaves with the wedding rings and drives to Soldier's funeral, only to arrive too late.

== Cast ==
- Everett Silas as Pierce Mundy
- Jessie Holmes as Mrs. Mundy
- Gaye Shannon-Burnett as Sonia Dubois
- Ronnie Bell as Soldier Richards
- Dennis Kemper as Mr. Mundy
- Sally Easter as Mrs. Richards
- Hobert Durham Jr. as Mr. Richards
- Angela Burnett as Angela
- Tim Wright as Big Daddy
- Cora Lee Day as Big Mama
- Monte Easter as Wendell Mundy
- Frances E. Nealy as Mrs. Dubois
- Sy Richardson as Mr. Dubois

== History ==
Charles Burnett calls this movie a tragicomedy based on the lives of the people who live in South Central Los Angeles. In a place where crime and violence are such a big part of everyday life and most people are stuck in their life, Burnett shows the life of an average person through the life of Pierce. He spends his days either wasting time with his friends or working a dead end job at his parents' dry cleaners with no thoughts of ever leaving. Burnett also depicts a typical household of dominant mothers and passive father as seen in Pierce's parents. Burnett's tragicomedy shows the life of African-American living in the working class communities as funny and loving, though impoverished. As a statement in the New York Times states "[Burnett is] making art out of materials and inspirations that lie close to hand. And the result is a film that is so firmly and organically rooted in a specific time and place that it seems to contain worlds.”

== Production ==
Charles Burnett was not allowed to finish editing the movie before it was sent to a New York film festival for screening by the producers. The rough-cut version of the film screened at the festival initially received a mixed review in The New York Times. This scared off distributors who believed it would be unsuccessful and the film was therefore never released to wider public audiences. Armond White, a film critic, commented that this was “a catastrophic blow to the development of American popular culture.” Almost twenty five years later when Milestone Films picked up the rights to the film, Burnett was able to finish editing and re-release the film.

== Release ==
=== Box office ===
My Brother's Wedding generated $4,294 in revenue during its first weekend on September 16, 2007. The film was screened in only one theater in the U.S. The film went on to earn gross revenue of $8,217. In April 2025 and early 2026 the restored film received art-house showings in Japan as part of a Burnett retrospective.

=== Critical reception ===
Upon release of the re-edited film, it received mostly positive reviews. Slant Magazine called this film timeless and necessary even though it did not hold up well as Burnett's first film, Killer of Sheep. The Village Voice stated it was "A treasure that demands to be unearthed in all its funny-sad tenderness." Jonathan Rosenbaum of the Chicago Reader said "If a better film has been made about black ghetto life, I haven't seen it."
