= Bless Their Little Hearts =

1984 film

- Film poster
- Directed by: Billy Woodberry
- Screenplay by: Charles Burnett
- Produced by: Billy Woodberry
- Starring: Nate Hardman; Kaycee Moore
- Cinematography: Charles Burnett
- Edited by: Billy Woodberry
- Release date: December 12, 1984
- Running time: 80 minutes
- Country: United States
- Language: English

Bless Their Little Hearts is a 1984 American drama film produced and directed by Billy Woodberry, starring Nate Hardman and Kaycee Moore. It was shot and written by Charles Burnett. The film had a limited theatrical release: it played for a week at the Royal in West Los Angeles and also at the Film Forum in New York.

In 2013, the film was selected by the Library of Congress for preservation in the United States National Film Registry for being "culturally, historically, or aesthetically significant".

In 2019, it was released on Home Video in a 2K restoration by Milestone Films.

== Plot summary ==
Unemployed, depressed and running out of options for supporting his wife and three children, Charlie Banks (Nate Hardman) is just barely eking out a living in the Los Angeles neighborhood of Watts in the early 1980s. His wife, Andais (Kaycee Moore), accuses him of irresponsibility, and even of cheating on her, an allegation that isn't true until Charlie decides it may as well be. Charlie's friends try their best to help him get by, but their well-intentioned plans don't always pan out as he struggles to find dignity and a meaning for life.

== Cast ==
- Nate Hardman as Charlie Banks
- Kaycee Moore as Andais Banks
- Angela Burnett as Banks Child
- Ronald Burnett as Banks Child
- Kimberly Burnett as Banks Child
- Langston Woodberry as mistress' son

== Critical response ==
Review aggregator website Rotten Tomatoes gives the film an approval rating of 100% based on reviews from 18 critics. At the time of its release, Vincent Canby of The New York Times concluded his review with "[the film] is so understated that at times it seems diffident, as if it were too shy to display its fury in more robust terms. This, however, is the style of the film that Mr. Woodberry, Mr. Burnett and their splendid cast, headed by Mr. Hardman and Miss Moore, have chosen to make, and it works beautifully."
