= Killer of Sheep =

- 2007 re-release theatrical poster
- Directed by: Charles Burnett
- Written by: Charles Burnett
- Produced by: Charles Burnett
- Starring: Henry G. Sanders; Kaycee Moore; Charles Bracy; Angela Burnett
- Cinematography: Charles Burnett
- Edited by: Charles Burnett
- Distributed by: Third World Newsreel then Milestone Film & Video
- Release dates: November 14, 1978 (Whitney); March 30, 2007 (United States)
- Running time: 80 minutes
- Country: United States
- Language: English
- Budget: $10,000
- Box office: $416,509

Killer of Sheep is a 1978 American drama film edited, filmed, written, produced, and directed by Charles Burnett. Shot primarily in 1972 and 1973, it was originally submitted by Burnett to the UCLA School of Film in 1977 as his Master of Fine Arts thesis.

The film depicts the daily life of Stan, a weary slaughterhouse worker struggling to maintain his humanity while providing for his family amidst the poverty of 1970s Watts. Rather than following a traditional linear plot, Killer of Sheep is composed of a series of vignettes that capture the rhythms of working-class life, childhood innocence, and the systemic frustrations of the urban environment. Critic Dana Stevens described its plot as "a collection of brief vignettes which are so loosely connected that it feels at times like you're watching a non-narrative film."

Shot in black and white, the film's style is often likened to Italian neorealism. There are no acts, plot arcs or character development, as conventionally defined. The cast consists mainly of non-professional performers, including many children.

The film offers a vision of Watts of the early 1970s that is quite different from the Watts of several decades later. Filmed at the tail end of the Great Migration of blacks fleeing the South, most of the characters were either born in the South or their parents were (Burnett himself was born in Mississippi). Multiple references to Southern culture are made in the film.

Killer of Sheep premiered at the Whitney Museum of American Art in New York on November 14, 1978. It did not receive a general release because Burnett had not secured rights to the music used in its production. The music rights were licensed in 2007 (and again in 2024) by Milestone Film & Video for US $150,000 after the film was restored by UCLA and transferred from a 16 mm to a 35 mm print. Killer of Sheep received a 200+ city release 30 years after it was first premiered, with a DVD release in late 2007.

The film was restored by the UCLA preservationist Ross Lipman, presented on DVD by Steven Soderbergh and distributed by Milestone Films. In 1990, the film was selected for preservation in the United States National Film Registry by the Library of Congress as being "culturally, historically, or aesthetically significant".

== Plot ==
The "plot" is secondary to the film's atmospheric exploration of the African American experience. In it, Stan suffers from chronic insomnia and emotional exhaustion. His work at the slaughterhouse — killing and processing sheep —serves as a grim metaphor for the repetitive, soul-deadening nature of his own existence.

The monotonous nature of his work begins to affect his home life with his unnamed wife and their two children, Stan Jr. and Angela. Through a series of episodic events—such as acquaintances attempting to involve Stan in a criminal scheme, a white woman proposing him to work at her store, and Stan and his friend Eugene trying to purchase a car engine—a mosaic of a harsh working-class life emerges. Within this life, Stan feels powerless to change the course of his circumstances. Intercut between these events are scenes of children in Watts, playing and roughhousing together among the abandoned houses and dilapidated surroundings.

== Cast ==
- Henry G. Sanders as Stan
- Kaycee Moore as Stan's wife
- Charles Bracy as Bracy
- Angela Burnett as Stan's daughter
- Eugene Cherry as Eugene
- Jack Drummond as Stan's son

== Production ==
Burnett used grant money from the UCLA School of Film to help finance the film, but delayed production because his first choice of actor was in prison and he wanted to wait until he was paroled. Meanwhile, he made the short film The Horse. When the university insisted he make his thesis film with or without his first-choice actor, Burnett cast Henry Sanders.

Killer of Sheep was shot in Watts on a budget of less than US$10,000 ($73,000 in 2025 dollars) over roughly a year's worth of weekends in 1972 and 1973, with additional shooting in 1975. In 1977, Burnett submitted the film as his Master of Fine Arts thesis at the School of Film at the University of California, Los Angeles. Burnett said he also intended to make the film a history of African-American music and filled it with music from a variety of genres and different eras. Burnett also kept a stable job while Killer of Sheep was being shot, spending his time working at an agency reading scripts and synopses.

== Roof jumping scene ==
One scene contains a low-angle shot of children leaping from rooftop to rooftop. Juliet Clark, a journalist writing for the Berkeley Art Museum and Pacific Film Archive, said the scene shows how children in the film "seem to achieve a mobility that eludes their elders".

In 2009, a still from the scene, showing one of the boys mid-jump, was reproduced in red tint and used as the cover of rapper Mos Def's album The Ecstatic. According to Complex magazine's Dale Eisinger, the "subtle and still-moving" cover has a "hazy, dream-like movement, appearing as a non-narrative, loose collection of vignettes that are tangentially fascinating and incredibly powerful", while reflecting the ideas of cultural justice and global inequality present throughout Mos Def's work.

== Critical reception ==
Though the film won the Critics' Award at the Berlin International Film Festival and was acclaimed at the Toronto International Film Festival, it never saw wide release due to complications in securing the music rights for the 22 songs on the soundtrack, which included such big names as Dinah Washington, Paul Robeson, Louis Armstrong, and Earth, Wind and Fire. It remained in obscurity for nearly 30 years, garnering much critical and academic praise and earning a reputation as a lost classic. The film did not win an award until four years after it came out, after having to wait four years to be released.

Killer of Sheep holds a 97% "fresh" rating on Rotten Tomatoes; the consensus states: "By turns funny, sad, and profound, Killer of Sheep offers a sympathetic and humane glimpse into inner-city life." Critics and scholars have likened the film to the work of Italian neorealist directors, particularly Vittorio De Sica and Roberto Rossellini, for its documentary aesthetic and use of mostly non-professional, on-location actors. Burnett has also been compared to Yasujirō Ozu for his strong sense of composition, Stanley Kubrick for his sharp ear for juxtaposing popular music with images, John Cassavetes for his knack for coaxing natural performances from amateur actors, and Robert Altman for his interest in the minutiae of human interaction. Burnett's self-professed influences are Jean Renoir, Basil Wright, and Federico Fellini, all of whom exemplify the tender, humane and compassionate qualities for which Burnett has been praised, qualities intensely present in Killer of Sheep. Critic Andrew O'Hehir, noting the strong influences of Jean Renoir, Roberto Rossellini, and Satyajit Ray, said, "It's hard to overemphasize how strange and ambitious and completely out of context it was for a black urban filmmaker with no money and no reputation to make that kind of movie in 1977."

In 1990, the Library of Congress selected it as part of the National Film Registry for being "culturally, historically, or aesthetically significant."

In 2008, Empire magazine ranked the film No. 398 of The 500 Greatest Movies of All Time.

The National Society of Film Critics chose Killer of Sheep as one of its 100 Essential Films.

In 2015, the BBC named the film the 26th greatest American movie ever made.

In 2022, Sight and Sound ranked it No. 43 on The Greatest Films of All Time.

=== Lists ===
The film appeared on several critics' top ten lists of the best films released in 2007.

- 1st – Ed Gonzalez, Slant Magazine
- 2nd – Philip Martin, Arkansas Democrat-Gazette
- 3rd – Glenn Kenny, Premiere
- 3rd – Michael Sragow, The Baltimore Sun
- 3rd – Nick Schager, Slant Magazine
- 3rd – Richard Corliss, TIME magazine
- 5th – Dana Stevens, Slate
- 10th – Ella Taylor, LA Weekly

== Distribution ==
Having previously only existed on 16mm prints, the film was restored and enlarged to 35mm by the UCLA Film and Television Archive, then digitized by Milestone Films. The soundtrack, which had not been licensed, was also paid for at a cost of over US$150 000, thanks in part to a donation from filmmaker Steven Soderbergh.

On March 30, 2007, it opened in select theaters in the United States and Canada and on November 13, 2007, it was released on DVD as part of a deluxe box set with a director's cut of Burnett's sophomore feature My Brother's Wedding and three Burnett shorts: Several Friends (a 1969 aesthetic precursor to Killer of Sheep), The Horse (an "allegory of the South", in Burnett's words), and When It Rains (praised as one of the greatest short films of all time by critic Jonathan Rosenbaum).

On Martin Luther King Jr. Day, January 21, 2008, Turner Classic Movies presented the world broadcast premiere of the film as part of a night-long marathon of Burnett's work. Burnett was interviewed before and after the film by TCM's primetime host Robert Osborne.

The film was released on Blu-ray and 4K through The Criterion Collection in May 2025.

== See also ==
- L.A. Rebellion
- Undun
- To Sleep with Anger
