= Kaycee Moore =

American actress (1944–2021)

- Born: February 24, 1944; Kansas City, Missouri, U.S.
- Died: August 13, 2021 (aged 77)
- Occupation: Actress
- Years active: 1978–1999

Kaycee Moore (née Collier; February 24, 1944 – August 13, 2021) was an American actress. Born and raised in Kansas City, Missouri, she was a member of the L.A. Rebellion, an alternative artistic movement developed at UCLA by Black filmmakers including Charles Burnett and Julie Dash.

Moore starred in films including Killer of Sheep, Bless Their Little Hearts, and Daughters of the Dust. Her work was received positively, and all three films were inducted in the Library of Congress’ National Film Registry for their depictions of Black American life.

== Life and career ==
Moore was born Kaycee Collier in Kansas City, Missouri in 1944. She moved to Los Angeles in the 1970s, where she worked at Max Factor. After joining a theater workshop, she began to perform in plays put on by UCLA students.

She met Charles Burnett, then a MFA student at UCLA, and starred in his thesis film Killer of Sheep (1978). Manohla Dargis of the New York Times referred to the film as "an American masterpiece." Moore later starred in Bless Their Little Hearts (1983) and Daughters of the Dust (1991).

Moore's final film role was in Ninth Street (1999), which was filmed in Kansas City.

== Personal life and death ==
Moore was married twice, first to John Moore, Jr., and then to Stephen Jones, who preceded her in death. She had two children, John Moore III and Michelle Swinton.

Moore died on August 13, 2021, at the age of 77.

== Filmography ==
Year	Film	Role
1978	The Boss' Son	Waitress at Disco
1978	Killer of Sheep	Stan's Wife
1984	Bless Their Little Hearts	Andais Banks
1991	Daughters of the Dust	Haagar Peazant
1999	Ninth Street	Pop-Bottle Ruby
