= Carroll Parrott Blue =

American film director

- Born: Carroll Ann Parrott; August 23, 1943; Houston, Texas, U.S.
- Died: December 11, 2019 (aged 76); Houston, Texas, U.S.
- Known for: Documentary film, interactive multimedia art
- Movement: L.A. Rebellion

Carroll Parrott Blue (August 23, 1943 – December 11, 2019) was an American filmmaker, director and author. Based in Houston, Texas, she was part of the L.A. Rebellion film movement. She was noted for her documentary film and interactive multimedia works, particularly for her project The Dawn at My Back: Memoir of a Black Texas Upbringing. Blue was a research professor at the University of Houston. She worked to preserve and celebrate the history of the African American community in Houston.

== Early life and education ==
Carroll Parrott Blue was born on August 23, 1943, in Houston, Texas. She grew up during the segregation era in Houston's Third Ward. During her childhood, Blue's mother Mollie Carroll Parrott worked with and for organizations such as Negro YWCA, Garden Club, Texas Negro Democratic Party, and many church groups that fought for civil rights during the Civil Rights Era. Blue graduated from Jack Yates Colored High School.

Blue began attending Boston University in 1960 and earned her B.A. in english literature in 1964. She earned her MFA in film production at the University of California, Los Angeles in 1980.

== Career ==
Blue's documentary works have focused on women of the African diaspora and visual arts themes. Blue's multimedia participatory projects developed out of her documentary work. Her autobiographical The Dawn at my Back, a work that combines film, text and hypermedia form, gave rise to the non-profit organization The Dawn Project and later to Third Ward Storymapping.

Her work is heavily concentrated in documentaries, African American cinema and digital community-based media. Blue was also involved in television. Her television programs include Varnette's World: A Study of a Young Artist (1979), Smithsonian World ("Nigerian Arts-Kindred Spirits," 1996) and NOVA ("Mystery of the Senses: Vision," 2007).

Blue was part of the L.A. Rebellion filmmaking movement (1967-1989), alongside Julie Dash, Charles Burnett, Jamaa Fanaka, Haile Gerima, Billy Woodberry, Barbara McCullough, Ben Caldwell, Alile Sharon Larkin, and Larry Clark. The L.A. Rebellion filmmakers worked against Hollywood's negative perspective of black people in starring realistic, anti-stereotype characters in their works. Filming African Americans in their communities was an important aspect of this work, as Zeinabu Irene Davis stated in 2014 the "goal was and is to represent, reflect on, and enrich the day-to-day lives of people in our own communities."

Blue became a professor emerita of San Diego State University in 1980.

Blue's documentary Conversations with Roy DeCarava (1983) is a highly respected piece in the Los Angeles School. This documentary looks at DeCarava's work and life in Harlem. She also created a documentary about Ghanaian sculptor El Anatsui which helped to launch his career. She served as a producer fellow for the American Film Institute in 1984 and 1985.

The Dawn at My Back: A Memoir of a Black Texas Upbringing, (2003) is a book, DVD-ROM and website. It explores Blue's family history and the history of Houston's black community. It won the Sundance Online Film Festival Jury Award in 2004 and was also named one of the 30 best American Association of University Press publications by the American Library Association in that year.

From 2006 through 2015, Blue was a research professor at the University of Houston. While at the University of Houston, she applied for a National Endowment for the Arts "Our Town" grant application to encourage people in the art and architecture field to improve the community. She was awarded $100,000 for this pursuit. In 2011 and 2012 she was appointed a visiting scholar at the Harvard Graduate School of Design.

Blue was passionate about transforming Houston and founded SEHTA, the Southeast Houston Transformation Alliance. In Blue's pursuit of making change in the Southeast Houston area, her work consisted of storytelling, interactive multimedia, public art and design. SEHTA tells the community's story by capturing the voices from the community while merging the objective facts of this community to reach her audience of academics, developers and donors. She was part of a team that created artwork at the Palm Center Transit Center and worked towards the renovation of Houston's Emancipation Park.

Shortly after Hurricane Harvey in 2017, Blue collaborated in the creation of a storymap for the Third Ward with The Dawn Project, the Houston Chronicle, and several other organizations. The project collected stories from Houston residents who were impacted by storm.

== Awards ==
Blue's work The Dawn at My Back: Memoir of a Texas Upbringing won the 2004 Sundance Online Film Festival Viewers Award in the New Forms Gallery category.

She was appointed a World Academy of Art and Science Fellow in 2007.

== Death ==
Blue died on December 11, 2019, as reported in the Houston Defender. She died of natural causes.

== Selected filmography ==
Carroll Parrott Blue has produced, directed and written films including those listed in the table below:

Title	Year	Director	Producer	Writer	Notes
"Nova" Mystery of the Senses: Vision	1995	Yes	No	No	Documentary
Smithsonian World's Nigerian Arts-Kindred Spirits	1990	Yes	Yes	No	Documentary
Conversations with Roy DeCarava	1983	Yes	No	No	Short documentary
Varnette's World: A Study of a Young Artist	1979	Yes	No	No	Short

== Selected publications ==
In Blue's work as an author she blends text with graphics and stills.

Blue's poem titled Sometimes a poem is Twenty Years of Memory: 1967-1987, showcases a few of her experiences early and throughout her career within those years. It explores how the interaction of her race, gender and community interact with her work in the film industry. It details good and bad experiences throughout.
