= New Black Cinema =

Period of African American filmmaking, c. 1985–1995

New Black Cinema, sometimes called the New Black Wave or Black New Wave, was a period of increased production and visibility for African American filmmakers in the United States, from the mid-1980s to the mid-1990s. Its directors were the second generation of Black filmmakers to come out of film schools, after the L.A. Rebellion. The period is usually traced to Spike Lee's She's Gotta Have It (1986), and reached a wider audience in the early 1990s with films such as Reginald Hudlin's House Party (1990) and John Singleton's Boyz n the Hood (1991).

Some of its films were made with studio money and others were financed independently. They ranged in genre from musicals to horror. By 1991 several Hollywood studios had films by Black directors in development. The success of Boyz n the Hood, New Jack City and Straight Out of Brooklyn that year set the conventions of the hood film, which came to dominate the period. The wave has no clear end date, but the British Film Institute's Ashley Clark finds that fresh, distinctive films had become scarcer by the mid-1990s.

== Background ==
African American filmmakers had worked outside the Hollywood studio system since the silent era. Oscar Micheaux produced his first feature, The Homesteader, in 1919, and independent race films were shown in segregated theaters until the mid-1950s. The blaxploitation films of the 1970s were the first Black films to draw a large general audience, but white filmmakers were behind many of them. From the late 1960s on, Black filmmakers trained at the UCLA film school, among them Charles Burnett, Haile Gerima and Julie Dash, rejected the conventions they had been taught and developed independent styles of their own; they became known as the L.A. Rebellion.

== Emergence in the 1980s ==
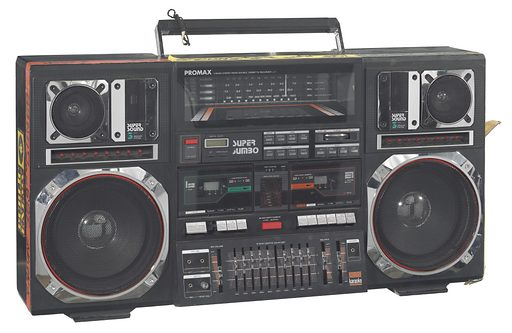
Radio Raheem's boombox from Do the Right Thing

The rise of New Black Cinema followed a broader revival of Black literature, music and visual art by artists who had come of age after the civil rights movement. Spike Lee's first feature, She's Gotta Have It, a comedy about the romantic lives of young Black people in New York, is generally taken as its starting point, and it was especially influential. Lee became the wave's leading figure, and commentators took to calling it the "New Black Wave". Writing from the 1991 Cannes Film Festival, the critic Roger Ebert compared this "black new wave" to the French New Wave and named Lee as the director who had started it. Lee's next films were School Daze (1988) and Do the Right Thing (1989).

Other films of the late 1980s included Robert Townsend's Hollywood Shuffle (1987), Keenen Ivory Wayans's I'm Gonna Git You Sucka (1988) and Charles Lane's Sidewalk Stories (1989). Do the Right Thing was not itself a hood film, but later hood films borrowed three of its features: the inner-city setting, a story confined to a short span in the present day, and a hip-hop soundtrack.

== Early-1990s breakthrough ==
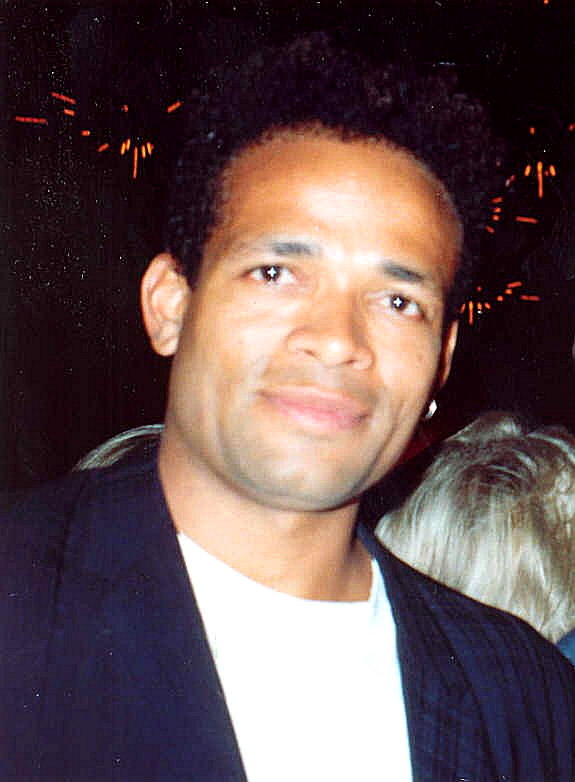
Mario Van Peebles in 1990

House Party, made by Reginald Hudlin and his brother Warrington Hudlin, starred the rap duo Kid 'n Play. Its success showed that teen films with Black casts could sell in the wider market, and its rap-driven style helped prepare the ground for the hood film.

On July 14, 1991, The New York Times Magazine ran a cover story by Karen Grigsby Bates, "'They've Gotta Have Us': Hollywood's Black Directors". It named Warner Bros., Columbia Pictures, Goldwyn, New Line Cinema and Island World among the studios with Black films in development, and expected the year's releases of such films to reach 19, exceeding the total for the entire 1980s. Singleton had sent his script for Boyz n the Hood to Columbia while still studying writing at the University of Southern California, little more than a year before; without any professional credits, Singleton was then given $6 million to direct it. The directors featured in the issue included Lee, the Hudlins, Ernest Dickerson, Mario Van Peebles, Singleton, Lane and Matty Rich.

By the end of 1991, at least 12 of the 19 films by Black directors scheduled for that year had studio backing. Releases that year included Boyz n the Hood, Van Peebles's New Jack City, Rich's Straight Out of Brooklyn, Lee's Jungle Fever, Bill Duke's A Rage in Harlem, Townsend's The Five Heartbeats and Julie Dash's Daughters of the Dust. Boyz n the Hood and A Rage in Harlem were both shown at Cannes that May. Boyz n the Hood earned an Academy Award nomination, and it and New Jack City were major commercial successes; Straight Out of Brooklyn had a special screening at the Sundance Film Festival.

== Genres and independent filmmaking ==
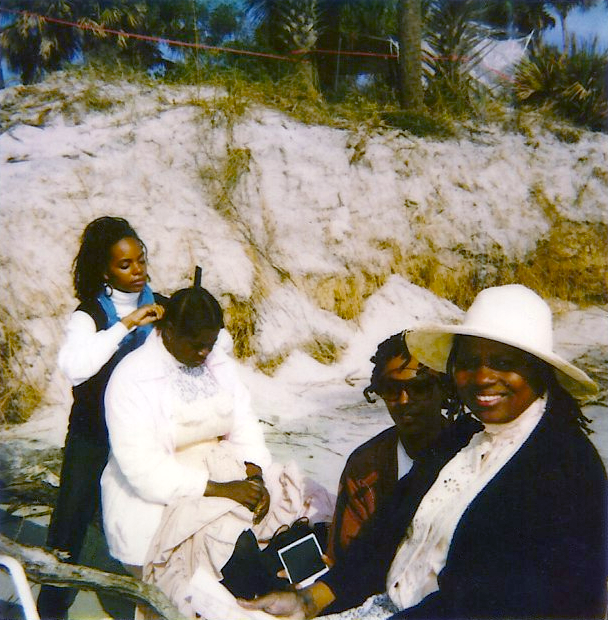
On the set of Daughters of the Dust, 1989

The films made up to 1991 were varied, from School Daze, a musical, and the horror film Def by Temptation (1990) to the Chester Himes adaptation A Rage in Harlem and family dramas such as To Sleep with Anger (1990) and Daughters of the Dust. That range then gave way to the hood film, which in the view of the film scholar Keith Harris narrowed New Black Cinema to stories about young men. The formula that Boyz n the Hood, New Jack City and Straight Out of Brooklyn established, and that Juice (1992) and Menace II Society (1993) took up, centered on young Black men in crisis, often played by rappers, in inner-city settings scored to rap. The film scholar Jacquie Jones complained in 1991 that these films, every one by a male director, rarely left "the contemporary urban ghetto", and that of all of them, only A Rage in Harlem gave a Black actress a leading role, with Robin Givens as Imabelle.

Acclaimed films that did not fit the mold, such as Daughters of the Dust and Wendell B. Harris Jr.'s Chameleon Street (1989), never crossed over to a wide audience; Harris suggests this was perhaps because they lacked the hood film's crime plots and male coming-of-age stories. Leslie Harris's Just Another Girl on the I.R.T. (1992), whose heroine is a young woman set on leaving the neighborhood, drew notice from critics and academics but failed commercially. In the years after She's Gotta Have It, other independent filmmakers made challenging films far from the mainstream, among them Wendell Harris and Marlon Riggs, whose documentary Tongues Untied (1989) dealt with gay Black life.

Julie Dash came from the L.A. Rebellion, and Daughters of the Dust is classed by Clark as a later work of that movement and by Harris as a New Black Cinema release.

== Mid-1990s and legacy ==
Few of the wave's directors found the funding to build a lasting body of work, and by the mid-1990s films set in Black urban neighborhoods had mostly settled into hood movies or formulaic comedies. The hood film cycle ran from about 1989 to 1995. The wide release that year of Devil in a Blue Dress and Waiting to Exhale signaled that it was fading, and by 1997 films such as Eve's Bayou, Love Jones, Rosewood and Soul Food were telling other kinds of stories, though none set off a wave of imitators as the hood film had. In 1995 the industry was also turning toward the blockbuster action film. Harris argues that once the Rodney King beating and the O. J. Simpson trial had become media spectacles, the hood film's redemptive image of young Black men stopped working as entertainment for mainstream viewers. Harris calls the more varied Black filmmaking of the late 1990s a post–New Black Cinema period.

Van Peebles, the Hudlins, the Hughes brothers, Singleton and Rich all followed their hits with features outside the hood genre. Reginald Hudlin later produced Django Unchained (2012), whose Best Picture nomination made Hudlin the fourth African American producer nominated in that category.

== See also ==
- Hood film
- L.A. Rebellion
