= L.A. Rebellion =

1967–1989 African-American film movement

- Years active: 1967–1999
- Location: United States
- Major figures: Charles Burnett, Larry Clark, Julie Dash, Zeinabu Irene Davis, Jamaa Fanaka, Haile Gerima, Alile Sharon Larkin, Billy Woodberry
- Influences: African cinema, Cuban cinema, Cinema Novo, European art cinema, French New Wave, Italian neorealism, Latin American cinema

The L.A. Rebellion film movement, sometimes referred to as the "Los Angeles School of Black Filmmakers", or the UCLA Rebellion, refers to the new generation of young African and African-American filmmakers who studied at the UCLA Film School in the late-1960s to the late-1990s and have created a black cinema that provides an alternative to classical Hollywood cinema.

== Background ==
In June 1953, Ike Jones became the first African American to graduate from the UCLA Film School. In the next 15 years, the numbers of African-American filmmakers remained small. One of those was Vantile Whitfield, who founded the Performing Arts Society of Los Angeles in 1964 and received a master's degree at UCLA in 1967. By the late 1960s, in the midst of affirmative action, the number of black students steadily increased. Among this new crop of artists were Charles Burnett, an engineering student who had attended Los Angeles City College, and Haile Gerima, an Ethiopian filmmaker who had recently moved from Chicago. Unlike their predecessors, they eschewed Hollywood conventions and were influenced by films from Latin America, Italian neorealism, European art films, and the emerging cinema of Africa. They were among the first of what became known as the "Los Angeles School of Black Filmmakers."

In the wake of the Watts Riots and other forms of social unrest, such as a 1969 shoot-out on the UCLA campus involving Ron Karenga's US Organization, Burnett and several other students of color helped push the university to start an ethnographic studies program. Elyseo J. Taylor, who was the only Black instructor at the UCLA Film School in the early 1970s, was an influential instructor in that program.

Teshome Gabriel, a film scholar and historian, began teaching at UCLA in 1974 and became both a colleague and mentor to many filmmakers associated with the movement.

== Identification of movement ==
Film scholar Clyde Taylor coined the term "L.A. Rebellion" to describe the filmmakers.

In the spring of 1997, Doc Films, a student-run film society based at the University of Chicago, hosted one of the first retrospectives of L.A. Rebellion films. Jacqueline Stewart, an associate professor at the university, helped coordinate the program. This series included works by Charles Burnett, Haile Gerima and Julie Dash.

In Fall 2011, UCLA Film and Television Archive programmed a major retrospective of these films entitled, "L.A. Rebellion: Creating a New Black Cinema." The series was funded by the Getty Foundation as a part of Pacific Standard Time: Art in L.A. 1945-1980. Preceding the program, the UCLA curatorial team conducted oral histories, identifying nearly fifty filmmakers, many of whom had remained invisible for decades. Papers and films by the filmmakers were collected and numerous films were preserved before screening. A catalog was also published, "L.A. Rebellion: Creating a New Black Cinema (Los Angeles, 2011), which accompanied the touring program through more than fifteen cities in North America and Europe.

== List of important figures of the L.A. Rebellion movement ==
=== Filmmakers ===
Many of the filmmakers listed below, while primarily known as writer/directors, worked in multiple capacities on various film productions through their early careers.

- Gay Abel-Bey
- Anita W. Addison
- Shirikiana Aina
- Don Amis
- Melvonna Ballenger
- S. Torriano Berry
- Carroll Parrott Blue
- Storme' Bright (Sweet)
- Charles Burnett
- Ben Caldwell
- Larry Clark
- Julie Dash
- Zeinabu irene Davis
- Pierre Desir
- Alicia Dhanifu
- Omah Diegu (Ijeoma Iloputaife)
- Jamaa Fanaka
- Jacqueline Frazier
- Haile Gerima
- Alile Sharon Larkin
- Barbara McCullough
- Bernard Nicolas
- O.Funmilayo Makarah
- Thomas Penick
- Imelda Sheen (Mildred Richard)
- Monona Wali
- Grayling Williams
- Robert Wheaton
- Iverson White
- Billy Woodberry

=== Actors ===
The following actors appeared in various L.A. Rebellion films and are to some degree associated with the movement:

- Adisa Anderson
- Haskell V. Anderson III
- Barbara-O
- Charles David Brooks III
- Angela Burnett
- Nate Hardman
- Kaycee Moore
- Sy Richardson
- Henry G. Sanders

=== Others ===
The following have supported the work of L.A. Rebellion filmmakers as mentors and/or scholars:

- Clyde Taylor, film critic, coined the phrase "L.A. Rebellion" to describe this movement
- Elyseo J. Taylor, filmmaker and instructor at UCLA
- Vantile Whitfield, an early African-American UCLA Film School graduate and founder of the Performing Arts Society of Los Angeles (PASLA)
- Teshome Gabriel, film scholar and Professor at UCLA
- Ntongela Masilela, film scholar
- Jacqueline Najuma Stewart, film scholar and Associate Professor at Northwestern University
- Allyson Nadia Field, Associate Professor of Cinema and Media Studies and African American Studies at UCLA
- Jan-Christopher Horak, Director of the UCLA Film & Television Archive

== List of notable L.A. Rebellion films ==
The following is a chronological list of short and feature-length films from the L.A. Rebellion filmmakers that are generally considered to be seminal or notable.

- Several Friends (1969)
- Single Parent Family: Images in Black (1976)
- Emma Mae (1976)
- Harvest: 3,000 Years (1976)
- Passing Through (1977)
- Killer of Sheep (1978)
- Bush Mama (1979)
- Penitentiary (1979)
- Water Ritual #1: An Urban Rite of Purification (1979)
- Your Children Come Back to You (1979)
- Ashes and Embers (1982)
- A Different Image (1982)
- Illusions (1982)
- Bless Their Little Hearts (1984)
- Cycles (1989)
- To Sleep with Anger (1990)
- Daughters of the Dust (1991)
- Sankofa (1993)
- The Glass Shield (1994)
- Compensation (1994)

== Influence and legacy ==
A documentary, Spirits of Rebellion: Black Cinema at UCLA, features interviews with many filmmakers associated with the movement. Directed by Zeinabu irene Davis, it was screened as a work-in-progress on Saturday, October 8, 2011 as part of "L.A. Rebellion: Creating a New Black Cinema."

L.A. Rebellion films that have been inducted onto the National Film Registry: Killer of Sheep (1990), Daughters of the Dust (2004), Bless Their Little Hearts (2013), To Sleep with Anger (2017), Illusions (2020), Bush Mama (2022) and Compensation (2024)

The L.A. Rebellion has continued to influence on aspects of contemporary Black music across the country. In 2009, popular Brooklyn-born rapper and activist Yasiin Bey, released an album titled, The Ecstatic. The Ecstatic's album cover photo is a still image taken directly from a shot in Charles Burnett's Killer of Sheep but overlain with a purple filter. Mos Def had named Killer of Sheep as one of his favorite films in a Pitchfork interview.

== See also ==
- African cinema
- Blaxploitation
- Cuban cinema
- Cult classic
- European art cinema
- French New Wave
- Italian neorealism
- Latin American cinema
- New Black Cinema
- New Hollywood
- Race film
