= List of films about black girlhood =

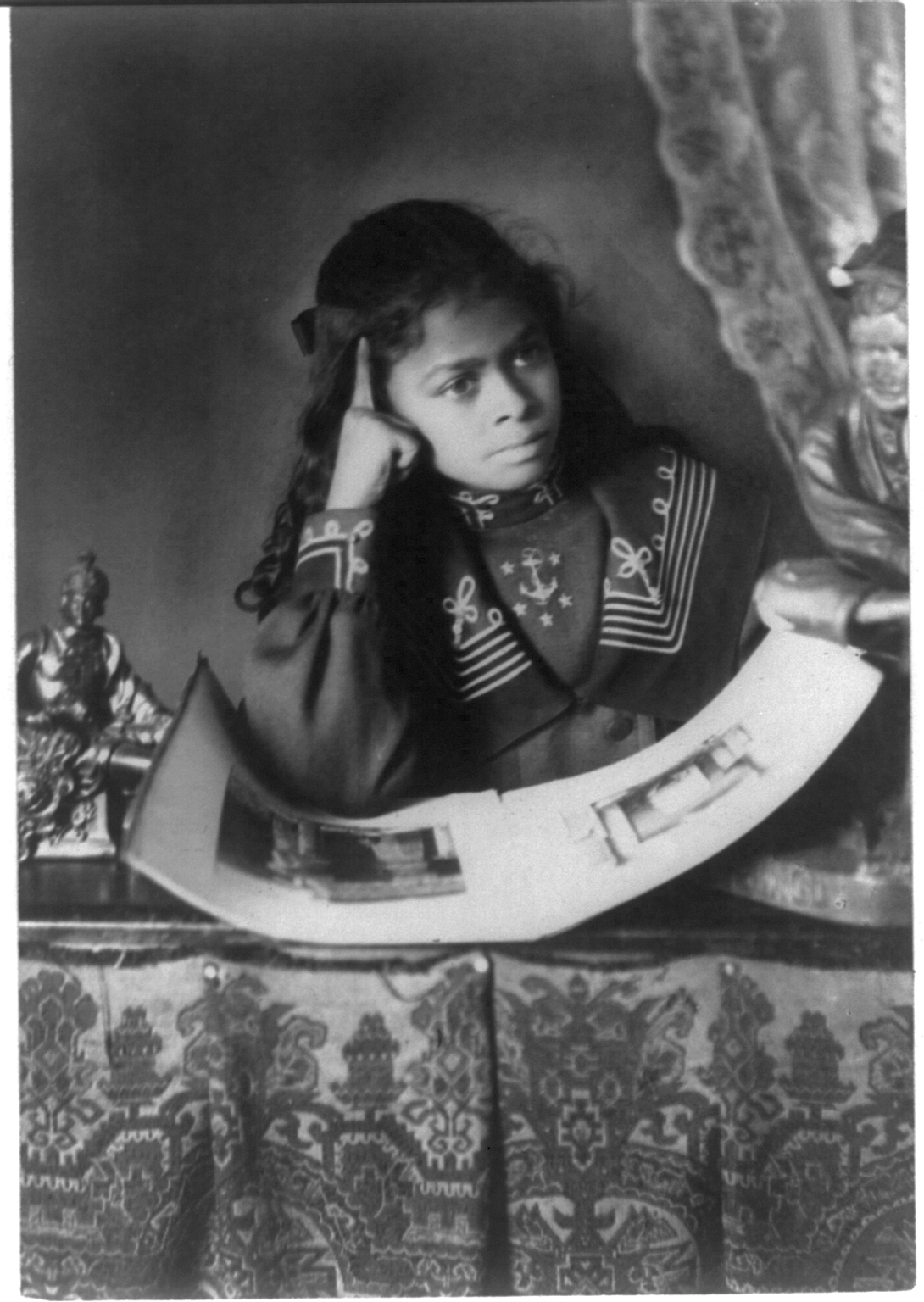
- This portrait of Black girlhood was part of a series of African American photographs originally assembled for a 1900 Paris Exposition by W.E.B. DuBois.
- Years active: 1970s–present
- Major figures: Ossie Davis, Julie Dash, Ava DuVernay, Leslie Harris (director), Kasi Lemmons, Channing Godfrey Peoples, Dee Rees, Céline Sciamma, Maïmouna Doucouré and others

This is a list of mostly U.S. American films about black girlhood. This age group can range from young children to those experiencing adolescence. These depictions are often called coming-of-age stories.

== pre-1980s ==
- Imitation of Life (1934)
- Jemima & Johnny (1966)
- Black Girl (1972)
- Cooley High (1975)
- Black Sister's Revenge (1976)
- Sparkle (1976)
- Cindy (1978)
- I Know Why the Caged Bird Sings (1979)

== 1980-1989 ==
- The Color Purple (1985)
- Polly (1989)

== 1990-1999 ==
- Flirting (1991)
- Just Another Girl on the I.R.T. (1992)
- Sarafina! (1992)
- Crooklyn (1994)
- Alma's Rainbow (1994)
- Girls Town (1996)
- Eve’s Bayou (1997)
- Cinderella (1997)
- Drylongso (1998)
- Ruby Bridges (1998)
- Double Platinum (1999)
- The Little Girl Who Sold the Sun (1999)
- Selma, Lord, Selma (1999)

== 2000-2009 ==
- Bring It On (2000)
- The Color of Friendship (2000)
- Love & Basketball (2000)
- Our Song (2000)
- Seventeen Again (2000)
- The Cheetah Girls (2003)
- Love Don't Cost a Thing (2003)
- The Proud Family Movie (2005)
- Twitches (2005)
- Akeelah and the Bee (2006)
- The Cheetah Girls 2 (2006)
- For One Night (2006)
- Half Nelson (2006)
- Life Is Not A Fairy Tale: The Fantasia Barrino Story (2006)
- College Road Trip (2008)
- Rain (2008)
- Precious (2009)
- The Princess and the Frog 2009

== 2010-2019 ==
- Pariah(2011)
- Yelling to the Sky (2011)
- Beasts of the Southern Wild (2012)
- Sparkle (2012)
- Annie (2014)
- Girlhood (2014)
- The Gabby Douglas Story (2014)
- The Fits (2015)
- Home (2015)
- A Girl Like Grace (2015)
- Flowers (2016)
- The Girl with All the Gifts (2016)
- Queen of Katwe (2016)
- Deidra & Laney Rob A Train (2017)
- For Ahkeem (2017)
- Everything, Everything (2017)
- I Am Not a Witch (2017)
- Roxanne, Roxanne (2017)
- Step (2017)
- The Wiz Live! (2017)
- Jinn(2018)
- Mahalia Melts in the Rain (2018)
- Night Comes On (2018)
- Rafiki (2018)
- Solace (2018)
- First Match (2018)
- Fast Color (2018)
- The Hate U Give (2018)
- A Wrinkle in Time (2018)
- Jezebel (2019)
- Little (2019)
- Pick (2019)
- Rocks (2019)
- Premature (2019)
- Selah and the Spades (2019)
- See You Yesterday (2019)
- The Sun Is Also a Star (2019)
- Atlantics (2019)
- Zombi Child (2019)

== 2020s ==
- A Babysitter's Guide to Monster Hunting (2020)
- Cuties (2020)
- Miss Juneteenth (2020)
- Pillars (2020)
- She Paradise (2020)
- Selah and the Spades (2020)
- Tahara (2020)
- Upside-Down Magic (2020)
- Beba (2021)
- Black as Night (2021)
- Respect (2021)
- Sisters on Track (2021)
- Anything's Possible (2022)
- Darby and the Dead (2022)
- Hawa (2022)
- On The Come Up (2022)
- The Silent Twins (2022)
- Wendell & Wild (2022)
- All Dirt Roads Taste of Salt (2023)
- The Angry Black Girl and Her Monster (2023)
- The Color Purple (2023)
- Gray Matter (2023)
- Girl (2023)
- The Little Mermaid (2023)
- Missing (2023)
- Praise This (2023)
- Wish (2023)
- Dandelion (2024)
- Suncoast (2024)
- One of Them Days (2024)

== See also ==
- List of teen films
- Sociology of childhood
