= Barbara McCullough =

American film director (born 1945)

- Born: 1945 (age 80–81); New Orleans, Los Angeles, United States
- Occupations: Director production manager visual effects artist
- Years active: 1979–present
- Known for: Experimental film and video

Barbara McCullough (born 1945) is an American director, production manager and visual effects artist whose directorial works are associated with the Los Angeles School of Black independent filmmaking. She is best known for Water Ritual #1: An Urban Rite of Purification (1979), Shopping Bag Spirits and Freeway Fetishes: Reflections on Ritual Space (1980), Fragments (1980), and World Saxophone Quartet (1980).

== Early life and education ==
Born in New Orleans, McCullough moved to Los Angeles when she was 11 years old. Her father was a musician and because he was a blind veteran she had scholarship opportunities which allowed her to attend private school. She attended Bishop Conaty Memorial High School and after taking courses at Cal State L.A. and L.A. Community College, got into UCLA through an undergraduate affirmative action program. While attending UCLA she would become part of the second wave of the popularly known L.A. Rebellion filmmakers which was dominated by women of color including Alile Sharon Larkin, Julie Dash, Jacqueline Frazier, Melvonna Ballenger, O. Funmilayo Makarah, and Carroll Parrott Blue. Being a UCLA student, McCullough partook in Project One which was a rite of passage for aspiring film students which had them write, direct, and edit a motion picture during their first academic quarter before they had had a production class. Project One would be the starting point for many of the filmmakers of the L.A. Rebellion including Julie Dash and Carrol Parrott Blue. From Project One, McCullough produced what is believed to be her first film Chephren-Khafra: Two Years of a Dynasty.

McCullough was fascinated by dance, but she felt that she had to look outside it for a way to express her creativity within the constraints of her role as a college student enrolled at UCLA and as the mother of two children. She was also interested in history, psychology and literature, particularly the work of Zora Neale Hurston. It was her love for photography drew her to experimental film and video, where she wanted to become the "Hurston of video" and to “tap the spirit and richness of [her] community by exposing its magic, touching its textures and trampling old stereotypes while revealing the untold stories reflective of African American life.” McCullough would go on to earn her B.A. in Communications Studies and her M.F.A. in Theater Arts, Film and Television Production at UCLA, and her work secured her position as an influential representative of the Los Angeles School of Black Filmmakers. The women filmmakers of the Los Angeles School shared the movement's desire to communicate their ideas about black people's history and experience in film or video, but they also often sought to emphasize women's experiences, and McCullough's work in particular was preoccupied with the themes of creativity and ritual.

She would later recall about her time at UCLA that "it was unwritten philosophy that you weren't just a student but an independent filmmaker existing in a community of independent filmmakers who supported each other's work as best they could. Most of the time, no one had any real financial support, and it took some of us years to complete our projects. But the film school was our factory and production facility. Each one of us was a mini film company producing our very special works. We basically learned from each other and struggled through a system that wasn't particularly nurturing. I don't think that the faculty really thought that there was a life for our work beyond film school", and that, "it was a highly politically charged environment."

== Career ==
=== Independent career ===
McCullough's first film Chephren-Khafra: Two Years of a Dynasty was produced as her Project One film at UCLA. The film features McCullough's then two-year-old son and weaves together moving images and still photography in a personal portrait. The themes in the film include Egyptian and other African histories as well as the relationship between the Black Diaspora and Africa. It also expresses Afrofemcentrism, examines the location of family, destabilizes the boundary between home and work, and visualizes cinematically unfamiliar ideas of the black female imagination.

McCullough's Water Ritual #1: An Urban Rite of Purification is inspired by an experience with a friend who suffered a nervous breakdown and African spiritualism as it portrays a woman ritually stirring a mixture of soil and other substances in a calabash, then cups the mixture in her hands, and then blows it away. The film has been controversial because it then depicts the woman going back into the crumbling structure of the building behind her and urinating on the ground. McCullough explained that the woman was intended to symbolize all displaced people from developing countries who are forced to live according to the values of other cultures. Her act of defiance in a strange land asserts her freedom over her own body. The film was shot in 16mm black and white, the film was made in an area in Watts, L.A. that had been cleared to make way for the I-105 freeway.

Shopping Bag Spirits and Freeway Fetishes: Reflections on Ritual Space consists of separate episodes documenting Los Angeles artists as they create works of improvisational art. McCullough interviews the artists and asks them about their ritual and creative processes, and her subjects include painter and sculptor Kinshasha Conwill; poet Kamau Daa'ood; sculptor David Hammons; sculptor N'senga Negundi; musician Raspoeter Ojenke; and painter and sculptor Bettye Saar. In an interview about her film, McCullough stated that "ritual is a symbolic action" capable of releasing the subject from herself to allow her to "move from one space and time into another."

She uses this as a means of self-determination and self-representation. As many of the other L.A. Rebellion filmmakers express in their works; it is crucial for a community to define itself on its own terms. McCullough chooses to represent the rituals and creative processes of these artists to allow them to speak for themselves. Despite allowing the interviewees the space within the film, McCullough occupies the lens and space outside of and surround each subject. She uses this space to speak for herself, to allow herself to become a subject. Under this lens, her work takes on a new meaning that allows the viewer to uncover each layer of the film. The filmmaker no longer exists as a viewer, they become as much a part of the experience for the audience as the actors.

Her short film Fragments (1980) is a continuation into the exploration of ritual from Shopping Bag Spirits.

Her 1980 short film World Saxophone Quartet is about a short conversation with the World Saxophone Quartet whose members comment on their work and motivation. Unlike her more formalist work, World Saxophone Quartet would go on to be picked up by PBS and shown at international film festivals, particularly during Black History Month.

McCullough has completed substantial work toward a documentary about Black jazz pianist and composer Horace Tapscott (Horace Tapscott: Musical Griot), who stayed in Los Angeles even after attaining a national reputation so that he could continue to help the Watts community where he grew up. The film highlights Tapscott's musical education and career within the Watts Central Avenue Jazz tradition. Art Tatum, Earl Hines and Erroll Garner were all mentors to the young Tapscott in the 1940s, when Central Avenue hosted a number of jazz clubs. The film includes a series of interviews with Tapscott, footage of his performances as a solo artist and with his combo, archival material that documents the historical contributions of African Americans to the cultural life of Los Angeles, and excerpts of a lecture on jazz and the blues that Tapscott delivered to a group of Los Angeles teachers.

=== Commercial career ===
McCullough has served as the production coordinator for KCET-TV in Los Angeles, production manager for Pacific Data Images, worked for Cine Motion Pictures, Digital Domain, and has been the Manager of Recruitment & Academic Outreach at Rhythm and Hues Studios. After two decades working in film production and visual effects in Los Angeles, she has earned multiple credits on big studio feature films including The Prince of Egypt (1998), Toys (1992), and Ace Ventura: When Nature Calls (1995). McCullough was also the Chair of the Visual Effects Department at Savannah College of Art and Design (2010-2016)

=== Museum exhibitions ===
McCullough's works have been exhibited in universities, galleries, museums, festivals and programs within the United States and abroad including the Museum of Contemporary Art, Los Angeles (MOCA), Hammer Museum, Tate Modern, Whitney Museum, Coursitane Film Festival, Brooklyn Museum, American Film Institute, Muzeum Sztuki-Lodz, Poland, British Film Institute, Irish Film Institute, Houston Cinema Arts Film Festival, New Orleans Film Festival, ATLarge Music Film Festival, Pan African Film Festival, African Diaspora Intl. Film Festival, and upcoming projects at the Gray Center for Arts, Chicago and the Essay Film Festival in London, England.

== Style and themes ==
McCullough's films tend to involve the African diaspora, black feminism, and improvisation. They, “go beyond resisting spectatorship and create a space for the "assertion of critical black female spectatorship as”... “they allow new transgressive possibilities for the formulation of identity.’” In describing her own work, McCullough has said, “Stylistically, I have my own personal style. I like things that are offbeat, unusual. At the same time I like my films to reflect the diversity of my background as a Black person as well as the different influences that affect me. When I do something, I am trying to show the universality of the Black experience. So even though I am dealing with something very offbeat and different, there is still a certain line of universality that runs through my work.”

=== Influences ===
She has cited Maya Deren, Jonas Mekas, and Senga Nengundi as influences.

== Filmography ==
=== Visual effects ===
1996 The Nutty Professor (production manager: Rhythm & Hues)

1995 Ace Ventura: When Nature Calls (production manager: Rhythm & Hues, Inc.)

1994 Interview with the Vampire: The Vampire Chronicles (digital production manager: Digital Domain)

1994 Color of Night (visual effects production manager)

1993 Heart and Souls (production manager: Pacific Data Images, Inc.)

1992 Toys (production manager: PDI)

1987 Made in Heaven (visual effects production coordinator)

=== Director ===
2017 Horace Tapscott: Musical Griot (Documentary)

1981 Shopping Bag Spirits and Freeway Fetishes: Reflections on Ritual Space (Video)

1980 World Saxophone Quartet

1980 Fragments (Short)

1979 Water Ritual #1: An Urban Rite of Purification (Short)

1977 Chephren-Khafra: Two Years of a Dynasty

=== Production manager ===
1998 The Prince of Egypt (digital operations manager)

1993 Freaked (production manager)

=== Producer ===
2017 Horace Tapscott: Musical Griot (Documentary) (executive producer)

=== Other ===
1982 A Different Image (Sound Assistant)

== Awards and nominations ==
=== Horace Tapscott: Musical Griot (2017) ===
Nominated for AMAA 2017 AWARD FOR BEST DIASPORA DOCUMENTARY

2017 New Orleans Film Festival Documentary Official Selection

Audience Award at 2017 Pan African Film Festival

Best Documentary Feature Nomination at 2017 BlackStar Festival

=== Grants ===
Grants for her work include an Avant-Garde Masters Grant for experimental film from the National Film Preservation Film Foundation for restoration by the UCLA Film and Television Archives of her film Water Ritual #1: An Urban Rite of Purification. Other grants were awarded by Brody Arts Fund, the Black Programming Consortium-Corporation for Public Broadcasting, Cultural Affairs of the City of Los Angeles, Western States Black Research Foundation and the National Endowments for the Arts.
