= Melvonna Ballenger =

Melvonna "Mel" Marie Ballenger (August 6, 1954 – June 25, 2003) was an American director, producer, and writer who created activist short films, known for her involvement in the L.A. Rebellion film movement. She died at the age of 48 from breast cancer.

== Education ==
Ballenger was born in St. Louis, Missouri. In 1972, she was selected to attend a high school workshop for Minority Broadcast Journalists hosted by University of Missouri School of Journalism in Columbia, Missouri. She attended Stephens College for women, also in Columbia, before transferring to Howard University. There, she studied broadcast journalism, worked at WHUR-FM, and earned a bachelor's degree in communications. She moved to Los Angeles after graduating Howard and joined UCLA's M.F.A. program in film and television production.

== Career ==
Ballenger's first film was Rain (Nyesha), which she directed in 1978 during her time at UCLA. The film, which includes John Coltrane's song "After the Rain," depicts a typist who becomes increasingly politically empowered. It received an honorable mention at Los Angeles's Black Talkies on Parade festival in 1982.

Ballenger's film Nappy-Headed Lady, later renamed "Pigtail Blues", was mentioned by the Star-Gazette newspaper as a "story of a black woman who changes her her hair style as she begins to appreciate her racial heritage". The film uses a mix of original video and documentary footage from the 1960s to explore the impact of Eurocentric beauty standards on Black women.

== Recognition ==
John William mentioned Ballenger in his article, "Daughters of the Diaspora: A Filmography of Sixty-Five Black Women Independent Film- and Video-Makers". Ballenger's student work at UCLA as part of the L.A. Rebellion helped her gain acknowledgment as an up-and-coming African American filmmaker.

== Films ==
- Rain (Nyesha) (1978, director)
- Gidget Meets Hondo (1980, script)
- Nappy-Headed Lady (1983, director)
- Dreadlocks and the Three Bears (1991, cinematographer)
- Fragrance (1991, sound mixer)
