= John Earl Jelks =

American actor (born 1959)

- Born: July 16, 1959 (age 67)
- Education: City College of San Francisco
- Occupation: Actor
- Spouse: Naomi Jelks (m. 1988; died 2002)
- Children: 3
- Awards: Tony Award for Best Featured Actor in a Play (2007 nomination)

John Earl Jelks (also credited as John Jelks; born July 16, 1959) is an American actor. Working extensively in theatre, Jelks is also known for screen roles, including in films such as Compensation (1999), Miracle at St. Anna (2008), Enter the Dangerous Mind (2013), and Night Comes On (2018), and television series such as True Detective (2019), The I-Land (2019), and On Becoming a God in Central Florida (2019).

In 2007, he was nominated for a Tony Award for Best Featured Actor in a Play for his role as Sterling Johnson in August Wilson's Radio Golf. In 2014, Jelks won a double Obie Award for Fetch Clay, Make Man and Sunset Baby. For First Breeze of Summer, Jelks also won the AUDELCO Award for Best Featured Actor in a Play, in addition to the production winning.

== Early life ==
Jelks' family was originally from Mississippi. He spent much of his childhood in California and Illinois, including in Chicago.

== Career ==
Jelks began acting at 18 while attending the City College of San Francisco, a public community college. He began his career in 1979 when he acted in his first play, Pinocchio Jones, which also starred Cindy Herron and was performed at Balboa High School. He went on to act in several plays, not acquiring an agent until he had been performing on stage for 7 years.

=== Stage acting ===
For a decade, from 1989 to 1999, Jelks performed in the independent play The Diary of Black Men. In 2002, Jelks performed The Piano Lesson at the Lorraine Hansberry Theatre. Later that year, Jelks performed Joe Turner's Come and Gone (directed by Marion McClinton) at the Kansas City Repertory Theatre and again at the Penumbra Theatre, where he later became a company member.

In 2004, Jelks made his Broadway debut in the August Wilson play Gem of the Ocean, which starred Phylicia Rashad. Gem of the Ocean was the first installment in Wilson's decade-by-decade ten-play chronicle, The Pittsburgh Cycle, dramatizing the African-American experience in the 20th century. Directed by Kenny Leon, the production took place at the Walter Kerr Theatre and has received five Tony Award nominations.

Jelks collaborated again with August Wilson in the 2007 premiere of the play Radio Golf at the Cort Theatre on Broadway. The final installment of the Pittsburgh Cycle, the production received 3 Tony Award nominations, including Best Play and Best Featured Actor in a Play for both Jelks and Anthony Chisholm.

In 2010, Jelks performed in the world premiere of the stage version of The Shawshank Redemption at the Gaiety Theatre in Dublin, Ireland. The play was based on the Stephen King novel that had been successfully adapted for the screen by Frank Darabont. Jelks played the part of Red in the production directed by Peter Sheridan and adapted for the stage by Owen O'Neil and Dave Johns.

Jelks has worked extensively in other Broadway and regional productions including Magnolia (2009), Fetch Clay, Make Man (2010), The Break of Noon (2010), Two Trains Running (2013), Sunset Baby (2013), Holler If Ya Hear Me (2014), ToasT (2015), The Piano Lesson (2016), and Head of Passes (2016).

In 2014, Jelks conducted acting workshops and performed in the play The Meeting at the Terra Sancta Theater in Amman, Jordan.

From 2016 to 2018 Jelks performed in 3 productions of Lynn Nottage's Pulitzer Prize-winning play Sweat, playing the part of Brucie, a middle-aged man unemployed for 2 years after losing his factory job. The play was performed in New York at the Public Theater Martinson Hall in 2016, before moving to Studio 54 in 2017. Jelks returned in 2018 for a run at the Mark Taper Forum in Los Angeles.

=== Screen acting ===
Jelks first starring screen role came in the 1999 film Compensation, which premiered at Sundance. The film depicts two Chicago love stories, one set in the 1900s and one in the 1990s, with both couples played by the same actors. Jelks played the dual roles of Arthur Jones and Nico Jones.

He has also appeared in Spike Lee's 2008 World War II historical film Miracle at St. Anna, and in Jordana Spiro's 2018 drama Night Comes On, which premiered at Sundance. In 2019, he acted in series 3 of HBO's anthology crime drama series True Detective, Netflix's science-fiction thriller miniseries The I-Land, as well as a recurring role in the Showtime comedy On Becoming a God in Central Florida.

== Personal life ==
Jelks is a widower, having lost his wife of 14 years, Naomi, in a traffic accident in 2002. The couple had 3 children, sons Jamal, Jabari, and daughter Jamila. The loss of his wife had led Jelks to consider leaving acting, but he eventually decided to remain in the career for his children. He dedicated his performance in the play Gem of the Ocean to his late wife.

== Filmography ==
=== Film ===
Year	Title	Role	Notes
1991	A Powerful Thang	Craig Watkins	Credited as John Jelks
1999	Compensation	Arthur Jones / Nico Jones	
2008	Miracle at St. Anna	Detective Dillard	
2010	The Start of Dreams	Self	Documentary Film, Credited as John Jelks
2013	Enter the Dangerous Mind	Lt. Ike	
2018	Night Comes On	John Lamere	Credited as John Jelks
2024	Exhibiting Forgiveness	La'Ron	

=== Television ===
Year	Title	Role	Notes
2011	Law & Order: Special Victims Unit	Mr. Achok	1 episode
2011	Da Brick	Jermaine Dansby Sr.	Television film, Credited as John Jelks
2012	Blue Bloods	Ray Bell	1 episode
2019	True Detective	Sam Whitehead	1 episode
2019	The Good Fight	Perry Cardwell	1 episode
2019	The I-Land	Professor Verne	2 episodes
2019	On Becoming a God in Central Florida	Judd Waltrip	5 episodes
2021	Love Life	Kirby Watkins	4 episodes
2022	East New York	James Hilliard	1 episode
2022–2023	New Amsterdam	Horace Reynolds	8 episodes

=== Short film ===
Year	Title	Role	Notes
1985	Dark Exodus		Credited as John Jelks
1986	Crocodile Conspiracy		Credited as John Jelks
2014	The Miraculous	Man from the Desert	Credited as John Jelks
2015	Tough	Larry	Credited as John Jelks

=== Stage ===
Year	Play	Role	Production	Notes
1989–1999	The Diary of Black Men	Muslim		
2002	The Piano Lesson	Boy Willie	Lorraine Hansberry Theatre	
2002	Joe Turner's Come and Gone	Herald Loomis	Kansas City Repertory Theatre	
2002	Joe Turner's Come and Gone	Herald Loomis	Penumbra Theatre	
2004	Gem of the Ocean	Citizen Barlow	Walter Kerr Theatre	Production won NAACP Theatre Award and Ovation Award
2007	Radio Golf	Sterling Johnson	Cort Theatre	Nominated - Tony Award for Best Featured Actor in a Play
2008	The First Breeze of Summer	Harper Edwards	Signature Theatre Company	Production won AUDELCO Award
2009	Magnolia	Thomas	Goodman Theatre	
2010	The Shawshank Redemption	Red	Gaiety Theatre	
2010	Fetch Clay, Make Man	Brother Rashid	McCarter Theatre Center	
2010	The Break of Noon	Detective Lawyer	The Geffen Playhouse, MCC Theater	
2013	Two Trains Running	Wolf	Two River Theater Company	
2013	Fetch Clay, Make Man	Brother Rashid	New York Theatre Workshop	Obie Award, Production Nominated for 11 AUDELCO Awards
2013	Sunset Baby		LAByrinth Theater Company	Obie Award
2014	Holler If Ya Hear Me	Street Preacher	Palace Theatre	
2015	ToasT	Stackolee	The Public Theater	
2016	The Piano Lesson	Doaker	McCarter Theatre Center	
2016	Head of Passes	Creaker	Berkeley Repertory Theatre	
2016	Sweat	Brucie	The Public Theater	
2017	Sweat	Brucie	Studio 54	
2018	Sweat	Brucie	Mark Taper Forum	
2019	Floyd's	Montrellous	The Guthrie Theater	
2022	Birthday Candles	Matt / William	American Airlines Theatre	

=== Video games ===
Year	Title	Role
2008	Midnight Club: Los Angeles	Doc (Voice)

== Awards and nominations ==
Year	Award	Title	Notes
2007	Tony Award for Best Featured Actor in a Play	Radio Golf	Nominated
2008	AUDELCO Award	First Breeze of Summer	Won
2014	Obie Award - Performance Gold Star	Sunset Baby and Fetch Clay, Make Man	Won
