= Compensation (film) =

- Compensation film poster
- Directed by: Zeinabu irene Davis
- Written by: Marc Arthur Chéry
- Based on: "Compensation"; 1906 poem by Paul Laurence Dunbar
- Produced by: Zeinabu irene Davis
- Starring: Michelle A. Banks; John Earl Jelks
- Cinematography: Pierre H. L. Desir, Jr.
- Edited by: Zeinabu irene Davis; Dana Briscoe
- Music by: Reginald R. Robinson; Atiba Y. Jali
- Production company: Wimmin with a Mission Productions
- Release dates: June 14, 1999 (Atlanta Film & Video Festival)
- Running time: 92 minutes
- Country: United States
- Languages: English; American Sign language
- Box office: $11,403

Compensation is a 1999 independent drama film produced, co-edited and directed by Zeinabu irene Davis and written by Marc Arthur Chéry. The film is about two parallel love stories set in turn-of-the-century and present-day Chicago, with both stories concerning a relationship between a deaf woman and a hearing man. The story is inspired by the 1906 poem of the same name from early African-American writer Paul Laurence Dunbar. The film stars Michelle A. Banks and John Earl Jelks in the leading roles. The early part of the story is shot like a silent film. Though the film was not released until 1999, filming took place in 1993.

The film premiered at 1999 Atlanta Film and Video Festival and was later screened at the 2000 Sundance Film Festival in the Dramatic Feature category. The film was also shown at the Museum of Photographic Arts in San Diego, the Independent Film Market in New York, and the Pan African Film Festival in Los Angeles. Film critic Richard Brody has described the film as "one of the greatest American independent films ever made."

In 2024, the Library of Congress selected the film for preservation in the National Film Registry, designating it "culturally, historically, or aesthetically significant,".

== Plot ==
In 1910, Malindy, an educated seamstress who mobilizes against segregation at her school for the deaf, meets and falls in love with Arthur, a hearing man and an illiterate migrant worker from Mississippi. Malindy teaches Arthur ASL and how to read and write. In the present day, artist Malaika and librarian Nico also fall in love after a series of encounters. Both couples revel in the splendor of romance and a possible lifetime commitment, only to be forced to deal with the dreaded diseases of their respective times: tuberculosis and AIDS. In both stories, the couples also face opposition from those that do not think a relationship between a hearing person and deaf person will be compatible.

== Cast ==
- Michelle A. Banks as Malindy Brown and Malaika Brown
- John Earl Jelks as Arthur Jones and Nico Jones
- Christopher Smith as William Young and dancer
- K. Lynn Stephens as Aminata Brown
- Nirvana Cobb as Tildy
- Kevin L. Davis as Tyrone

== Production ==
The film was not initially conceived as a story featuring deaf performers until Davis saw actress Michelle A. Banks in a production of Waiting for Godot in Saint Paul, Minnesota and was impressed by her performance. Davis' husband, Marc Arthur Chéry, revised the script to make her and other characters deaf. Davis also cast deaf actors in other roles and hired deaf technicians for the film crew.

The entire film was shot in Chicago, Illinois to pay tribute to the director's previous residence and to expose audiences to the beauty of the city. Chicago locations included the Ephphatha Evangelical Lutheran Church of the Deaf, the Legler Branch of the Chicago Public Library, and the Indiana Dunes National Lakeshore. Filming took place from July to August 1993.

Reginald R. Robinson, a noted ragtime composer and performer, served as the film's period music score composer. Robinson incorporated the piano and mandolin into all his compositions for the film. Atiba Y. Jali, served as the contemporary music score composer. Jali combined traditional instruments like the drums and flute with less commonly used instruments such as the balafou, berimbau and yidaki.

== Release ==
The film was screened at the 1999 Atlanta Film and Video Festival, the 1999 Toronto International Film Festival, and the 2000 Sundance Film Festival.

The film went unreleased on VHS and DVD for many years until 2021, when the Criterion Channel made Compensation available for streaming.

A 4K restoration was undertaken by The Criterion Collection, The UCLA Film and Television Archive, and Wimmin With a Mission Productions in conjunction with The Sundance Institute from a scan of the 16mm original camera negative. The 5.1 surround soundtrack was mastered from DAT tapes by the UCLA Film and Television Archive. Newly created open captions have been implemented, designed by Alison O’Daniel in collaboration with the Compensation Caption Creative Team. The restoration screened as part of the Revivals section of the 62nd New York Film Festival and the 60th Chicago International Film Festival. The restoration was screened in theaters on February 21, 2025, distributed by Janus Films.

== Critical reception ==
On the review aggregator website Rotten Tomatoes, 93% of 15 critics' reviews are positive. Metacritic, which uses a weighted average, assigned the film a score of 100 out of 100, based on 4 critics, indicating "universal acclaim". Kevin Thomas of the Los Angeles Times hailed the film as "beautiful and poignant", saying "Davis is adept at not only illuminating the challenges of love crossing the hearing barrier but also in suggesting that such a challenge does not somehow miraculously protect the couple from the even-greater challenges that can turn anyone's life upside-down in any era." Thomas called the film "an important achievement, illuminating and captivating, and it deserves the chance to see the widest audience possible."

Ian Grey of the Baltimore City Paper praised Compensation as "brilliant", citing Davis' " use of intertitles and subtitles (for, respectively, the film's early-1900s and present-day sequences) as a way to address the limitations of spoken language while simultaneously honoring contemporary African filmmaking techniques, which emphasize visuals over dialogue."

Roger Ebert of the Chicago Sun-Times praised the film as "dreamy, atmosphere reveries, rich in humor and social observation", and called it a "small, quiet, enchanting film about characters who endure and prevail and trust themselves." Rick Lyman of The New York Times noted the film is "structurally daring". Poet Elizabeth Alexander commended how the original poem that inspired the film appeared to "move this very contemporary filmmaker narratively to the past but technically forward to innovation".

In the journal Critical Methodologies, Greg Dimitriadis called Compensation "...a powerful film. It is boldly experimental. Illness and death are presented as forces that persons cannot control. The death of a loved one is blunted by the gift of love itself. That gift compensates for life’s losses. In showing this, Davis’s film brings great dignity and respect to the situations of African American women and men. At the same time, her film honors African American culture and history."

In a 2019 review for The New Yorker, Richard Brody also praised the film, writing "Davis incorporates a copious and evocative set of archival photographs into the earlier time’s action, and she films them with a sense of avid and dramatic curiosity that conjure the historical period with a moving immediacy. Filming in black-and-white, she develops a virtual historical archeology, lavishly detailed and alive to the aesthetic spirit of the time."

== Accolades ==
Compensation was awarded with the 1999 Gordon Parks Directing Award from the Independent Feature Project, as well as a 1999 Reel Black Award for Outstanding Film. The film was also nominated for the John Cassavetes Award at the 15th Independent Spirit Awards, an award given to filmmakers for debut features made under $500,000, losing to the shot-on-video blockbuster The Blair Witch Project.

== See also ==
- List of films featuring the deaf and hard of hearing
