= Fetch Clay, Make Man =

Two-act play by Will Power

Fetch Clay, Make Man is a two-act play written by playwright Will Power. Set within the days leading up to one of the most anticipated fights between Muhammad Ali and Sonny Liston. Ali forms an unlikely friendship with Stepin Fetchit, a controversial, vaudevillian Hollywood star. Award-winning performer and playwright Will Power, created an intense yet comical script that explores the improbable bond that formed between two incredibly different and influential American cultural icons. During the Civil Rights Movement of the mid-1960s, a vibrant and fearless fighter, and an almost-forgotten figure, fight together to shape their public personas and establish their legacies.

Fetch Clay, Make Man was in development for 3 years prior to its opening in 2010 at the McCarter Theater Center. Then in 2013 it had its New York premiere at New York Theatre Workshop. Both premiers were directed by Des McAnuff, and included costume designs by Paul Tazewell. In June 2023 Fetch Clay, Make Man had its Los Angeles premiere at Center Theater group in a new production co-produced by Springhill, and directed by Debbie Allen.Over the years Fetch Clay, Make Man has had a number of actors in its casts, including Sonequa Martin-Green, Ben Vereen, K. Todd Freeman, Nikki M. James, Ray Fisher, Danielle Deadwyler, Alexis Floyd, John Earl Jelks, and Edwin Lee Gibson.
