= Zeinabu irene Davis =

American filmmaker

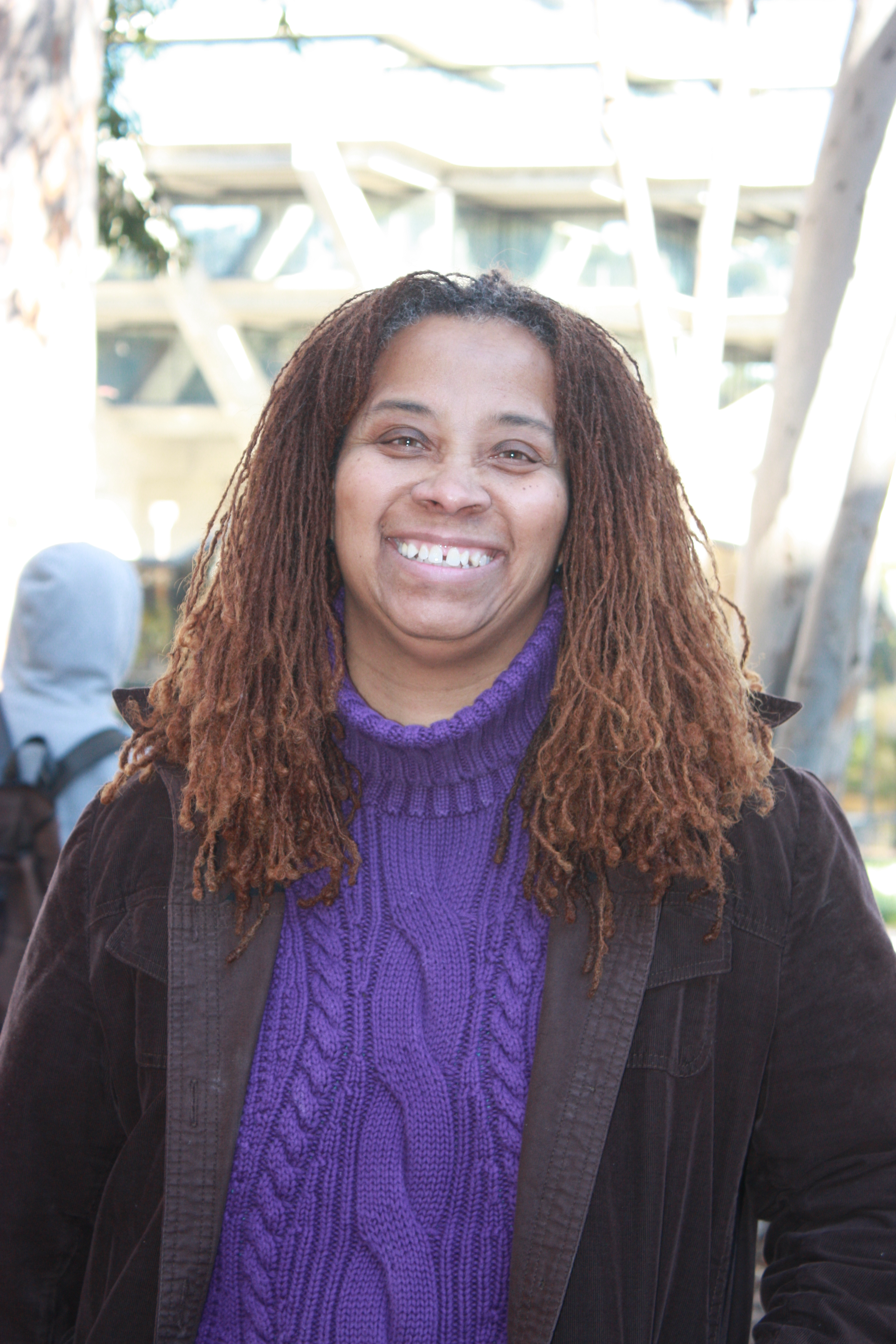
- Davis at the University of California, San Diego, 2010
- Born: April 13, 1961 (age 65); Philadelphia, Pennsylvania, U.S.
- Education: Brown University; University of California, Los Angeles
- Occupations: Film director; producer; professor
- Years active: 1982–present
- Spouse: Marc Arthur Chéry

Zeinabu irene Davis (born April 13, 1961) is an American filmmaker and professor in the Department of Communication at the University of California, San Diego. In 1985, she received her M.A in African studies at UCLA and went on to earn her M.F.A in Film and Television production in 1989. Davis is known as one of the graduates and filmmakers of the L.A. Rebellion. The L.A. Rebellion refers to the first African-American students who studied film at UCLA. Through their collective efforts, they sought to put an end to the prejudices of Hollywood by creating experimental and unconventional films. The main goal of these films was to create original Black stories and bring them to the main screens. Her works in film include short narratives, documentaries and experimental films that focus heavily on the African American female perspective.

== Personal life, education, and career ==
Born in Philadelphia, Zeinabu irene Davis gravitated towards arts, "theater and education". With a Catholic school background, Davis studied at Brown University, then later traveled to Kenya and studied there until the government shut down the university after some students had participated in political protest. In Kenya she met Ngũgĩ wa Thiong'o, and learned about the different peoples of Kenya and how they are underrepresented or misrepresented in film. She pursued her first master's degree in 1983 focusing on African studies, later receiving a Master of Fine Arts in film and video production from UCLA in 1989. She has received numerous grants and fellowships from such sources as the Rockefeller Foundation, the American Film Institute and the National Endowment for the Arts. She has taught at many colleges, including Antioch College and Northwestern University, but has more recently moved to teach at UC San Diego, where she currently serves as a Professor of Communication.

== Films ==
As a filmmaker, her films have been categorized as belonging to the genre of Black feminism due to the ways she incorporates the unique experiences of African American women. According to film scholar Gwendolyn Audrey Foster, Davis believes that black filmmakers are "developing a new genre that constitutes a black aesthetic". Furthermore, Davis was part of the L.A. Rebellion, which was a movement involving independent black filmmakers (who attended UCLA) aiming to reproduce alternative, humanizing, and more accurate images of black people unlike classical Hollywood cinema. From her experience of being part of this movement, Davis feels passionately about working within groups or organizations, especially as a beginner. She believes that the dynamic and different perspective help filmmakers grow and develop their unique styles.

=== Cycles (1989) ===
Working as the director, producer, editor and cast for her first short film, Zeinabu irene Davis depicts a woman's growing anxiety as she awaits her overdue period. While waiting for mother nature's monthly visit, the protagonist performs African-based rituals of purification. She calls upon spirits to clean not only her body but her house and soul. Jacqueline Stewart with UCLA describes Davis's techniques as she "combines beautifully intimate still and moving images of the woman's body and home space, along with playful stop-motion sequences".

=== Trumpetistically, Clora Bryant (1989) ===
Zeinabu irene Davis captures black woman icons with her unapologetic and undistorted lens. She depicts the life of Clora Bryant, the star and protagonist of Trumpetistically, Clora Bryant, as experiences setbacks from stereotyping and unfair treatment in the jazz world, despite her widely-recognized talent and unwavering passion. The 1989 film dives into the life and struggles of Clora Bryant–an indisputable jazz icon–through the documentary lens of the unheeded real. Beginning with her early life when she fell in love with the trumpet and ending well after Bryant lost her ability to play, this documentary shows how one woman defied the odds to become of the best trumpet players of any generation.

One thing that was clearly illustrated in this 57-minute documentary was the importance of remembrance and inheritance in African American culture. The emphasis Bryant placed on teaching her sons the importance of carrying a note, demonstrated Black women's pride in sharing both their talent and their secrets to overcoming racist and sexist obstacles with younger generations (Trumpetistically, Clara Bryant). She wanted them to achieve success while remembering their history and the sacrifices that not only she, but their ancestors made for their betterment. Women like Bryant wanted to leave the world knowing not only that their craft would live on, but that their children, loved ones, friends, and young Black people in general could take an easier route to discovering their true identity and freedom. One thing that Bryant did not want to pass on is her trauma. She endured hardships and sacrificed so that the future generations would not have to do the same. However, this is America; a system built upon structural racism and a racial hierarchy that scorns everyone who is not at the top. The trauma has endured. It has spanned decades with no end in sight. How do we stop it? One element that Davis's work achieves is emphasizing the importance of inheritance and the role that trauma plays in affecting multiple generations of Black Americans without recreating or causing new trauma.

=== A Period Piece (1991) ===
With this short film, A Period Piece, Davis collaborated with performer and activist Quinta Seward. In this film, four women perform a comic old-school rap about the preposterous claims in ads for feminine hygiene products. While not her first film to touch on the subject, this one takes a comic approach to menstruation - and reminds us that "confidence" comes from within, not from a box or tube.

=== Mother of the River (1995) ===
This film centers around Dofimae, a young, enslaved girl, who learns about the world through her father's riddles. Davis even begins this film with "a Yoruba proverb from Nigeria: 'Riddles are the horses of discourse'". Eventually, this young girl meets and cares for a shaman called Mother of the River. This shaman becomes fond of Dofimae and promises to free her and her father from the shackles of freedom by taking them up North someday.

=== Compensation (1999) ===
This 1999 film is Davis' feature debut. Centering around two Chicago love stories set a century apart, the two couples (a deaf woman and a hearing man) deal with deep, philosophical themes such as death and love. Davis delves into an original take on love stories as the characters deal with the societal issues of race, gender, class, education, and ability—all while communicating via sign language. This film truly "considers the ephemeral nature of love and life, while illustrating the enduring challenges of race and racism, over the course of a century".

=== Momentum: A Conversation with Black Women on Achieving Advanced Degrees (2010) ===
This film showcases the successes and achievements of students at the University of California San Diego.

=== Co-Motion: Tales of Breastfeeding Women (2010) ===
Through interviews with both parents, doctors, and other professionals, Davis creates a documentary that "explores contemporary views of breastfeeding".

=== Spirits of Rebellion: Black Cinema from UCLA (2015) ===
Tackling questions such as "What is Black film?" and "What were the origins of the moniker 'L.A. Rebellion'?", Davis seeks to provide intimate access to the films and filmmakers that identified with the L.A. Rebellion. The filmmakers included in this documentary are Charles Burnett, Ben Caldwell, Julie Dash, Haile Gerima, Barbara McCullough, Billy Woodberry, and Davis herself. She extends their stories with powerful interviews and commentary on their experiences as student film revolutionaries.

== Awards ==
Her film Compensation won the Gordon Parks Directing Award from the Independent Feature Project in New York. It was also screened at the Sundance Festival in 2000. It tells a parallel story of two deaf black women, one at the turn of the century and one in the later 20th century. She also won awards from the Black Filmmakers Hall of Fame and the National Black Programming Consortium for Cycles (1989), an experimental short film. In addition, her works such as A Period Piece (1991), A Powerful Thang (1991), Mother of a River (1995) and Compensation (1999) "continued to garner her awards from numerous organizations and festivals". In 2017, her film "Spirits of Rebellion" was awarded the Best Documentary Feature Film at the San Diego Film Awards.

== Filmography ==
Films
Year	Title	Contribution	Notes
1982	Filmstatement	Director	
1983	Recreating Black Women's Media Image	Director	
1986	Crocodile Conspiracy	Director	
1987	Sweet Bird of Youth	Director	5-minute short film
1987	Canta for Our Sisters	Director	
1989	Cycles	Director	
1991	A Period Piece	Director	
1991	A Powerful Thang	Director, Producer	
1995	Mother of the River	Director	
1999	Compensation	Director, Producer	
2005	Las Abuelas - Latina Grandmothers Explain the World and Other Stories of Faith	Co-director, Producer	
2005	Trumpetistically, Clora Bryant	Director, Producer	
2008	Delta Children: Future of the Blues	Co-director	
2009	Passengers	Director, Producer	
2010	Momentum: A Conversation with Black Women on Achieving Graduate Degrees	Director	
2010	Co-motion: Tales of Breastfeeding Woman	Director	
2015	Spirits of Rebellion: Black Film at UCLA	Director	Best Documentary Feature Film at the 2017 San Diego Film Awards

== See also ==
- L.A. Rebellion
- Women's Cinema
- U.S. Women Film Directors
- Film Director
- African American Film Director
- Women Screenwriters
- American Film Directors
