= Vantile Whitfield =

American arts administrator (1930–2005)

- Born: September 8, 1930; Washington, D.C., US
- Died: January 9, 2005 (aged 74); Washington, D.C.
- Other name: Motojicho
- Education: Howard University; UCLA
- Occupations: Arts administrator, director, playwright, educator, actor and production designer
- Spouses: Barbara Ellen Cobbs (m. 1950; div. 19??) Barbara Ann Grant (m. 1960; div. 19??); Lynn Whitfield (m. 1974; div. 1978) Loretta Collins (m. 1993)
- Children: Bellina Logan, Lance Vantile Whitfield, Elizabeth Whitfield
- Awards: NAACP Image Award, Los Angeles Drama Critics Circle Award

Vantile Emmanuel Whitfield (September 8, 1930 – January 9, 2005) was an American arts administrator who helped found several performing arts institutions in the United States.

== Early life and education ==
Whitfield was born on September 08, 1930, in Washington, D.C., an only child between Theodore Roosevelt Whitfield and Lugene Ellen Green. He was also known as "Motojicho". Throughout Whitfield's adolescence a path had been taken for him to become successful. Whitfield was a student at Dunbar High School, where he was active in playing football while gaining an interest in painting. After high school, he served in the Air Force until 1952. When, in 1957, Whitfield received a Bachelors of Arts degree, he became one of the first African Americans to study theatre at Howard University.

After graduating from Howard University, he enrolled in the master's degree program at the UCLA Film School, making him again, one of the first African Americans to study at that learning instituition. In 1969, Whitfield directed "Watts Gospel Festival" and "Watts Rhythm and Blues Festival" for KCET-TV in Los Angeles.

== Career ==
In 1963, Whitfield co-founded with actor Frank Silvera the American Theatre of Being in Los Angeles. While there he taught acting classes with Beah Richards, Whitman Mayo and Isabel Sanford. Also in 1963, Whitfield designed the sets, lights and costumes for Silvera's production of the James Baldwin play The Amen Corner, becoming the first African-American production designer to work on Broadway. The following year, Whitfield founded and served as producing artistic director of the Performing Arts Society of Los Angeles (PASLA). The goal of PASLA was to help train inner-city youth in the performing arts.

Whitfield's acting credits also include Tarzan where he was featured in two episodes, The Ultimate Duel as Kimpu and Mask of Rona as the Chief.

He was also founding Artistic Director of Studio West and was enlisted by Robert Hooks, of the D.C. Black Repertory Company, to be its Artistic Director.

In 1971, Whitfield was the founding director of the Expansion Arts Program at the National Endowment for the Arts (NEA). In this role, he had perhaps his greatest influence, because this program provided funds for many African-American artists and arts organizations.

== Association with L.A. Rebellion filmmakers ==
Although his tenure at UCLA Film School pre-dates the period generally associated with the L.A. Rebellion, Whitfield had a connection with several filmmakers associated with the film movement. Larry Clark taught film production classes at PASLA while a student at UCLA and directed the short film As Above, So Below (1973) through the organization. Whitfield also acted in Haile Gerima's film Ashes and Embers.

== Personal life and death ==
Whitfield divorced three of the four times he married. His first marriage was to Barbara Ellen Cobbs in 1950, his second marriage to Barbara Ann Grant in 1960, and his third marriage to actress Lynn Whitfield in 1974, all of which ended in divorce. In 1993, Whitfield married his fourth wife Loretta Collins, whom he remained married to until his death in 2005. Whitfield fathered three children. Among his descendants are actress Bellina Logan and jazz artist Lance Vantile Whitfield.

Whitfield died from complications of Alzheimer's disease on January 9, 2005.

== Awards and recognition ==
- 1969: NAACP Image Award
- 1970: Los Angeles Drama Critics Circle Award
- 1992: ETA Creative Arts Foundation Citation
- Jeff Citation for Among All This You Stand Like a Fine Brownstone
- 1996: AUDELCO Pioneer Award
