= Paul West (writer, born 1930) =

British-born American novelist, poet, and essayist (1930–2015)

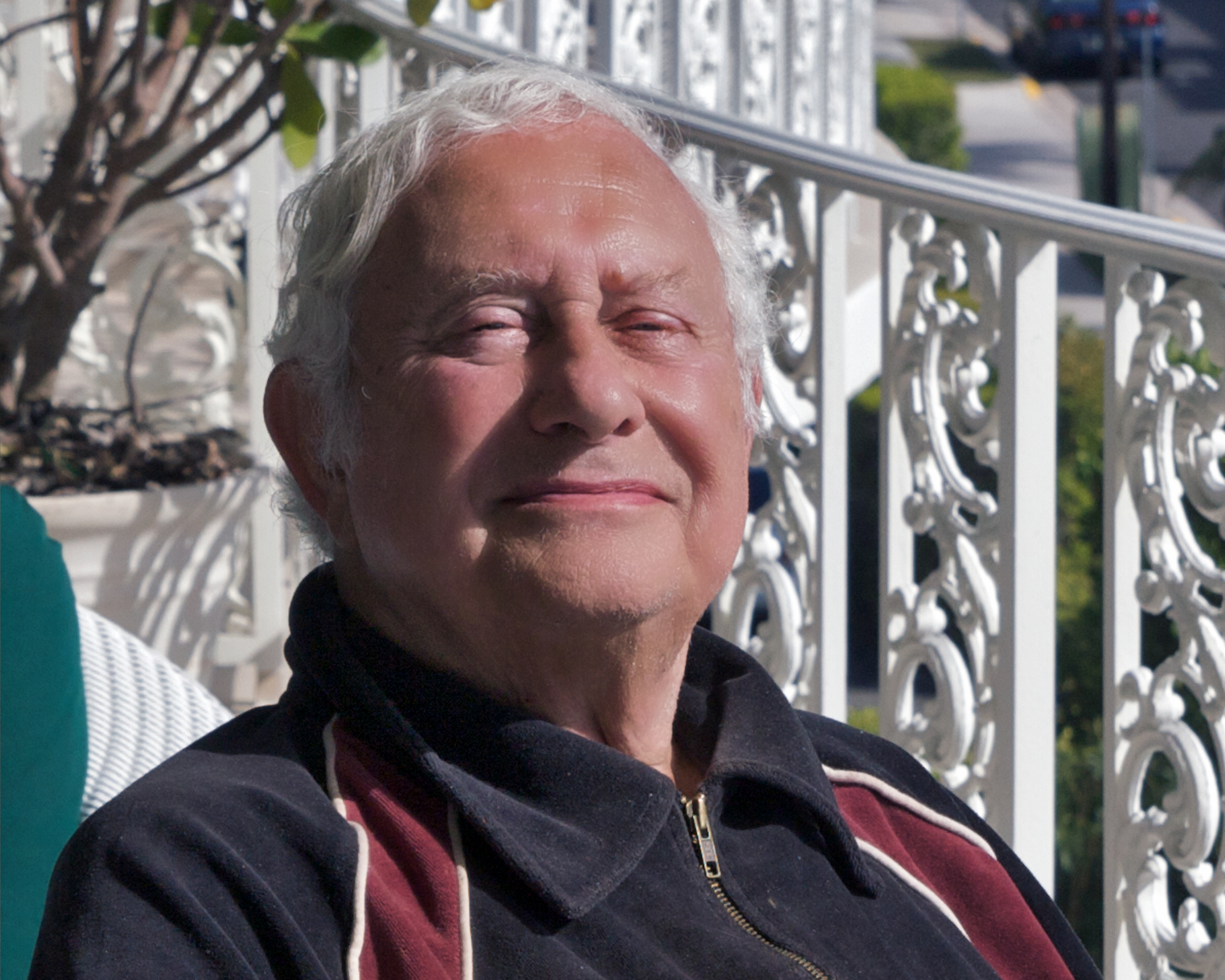
- Paul West in Florida, 2010
- Born: Paul Noden West; 23 February 1930; Eckington, Derbyshire, England
- Died: 18 October 2015 (aged 85); Ithaca, New York, U.S.
- Occupations: Author, professor
- Spouses: Paula Radcliffe (1960); Diane Ackerman
- Writing career
- Genres: Novels, poetry, memoirs, essays

Paul Noden West (23 February 1930 – 18 October 2015) was a British-born American novelist, poet, and essayist. He was born in Eckington, Derbyshire in England to Alfred and Mildred (Noden) West. Before his death, he resided in Ithaca, New York, with his wife Diane Ackerman, a writer, poet, and naturalist. West is the author of more than 50 books.

== Early life ==
West grew up in Eckington, a rural mining town in Derbyshire, England. His father, partly blinded in World War I, was often unemployed. His mother, a talented pianist, gave private lessons to help support the family. She encouraged West in his love of words and his literary ambitions. In a 1989 interview by author and literary critic David W. Madden, West said he was also encouraged by three teachers, "amazing women who taught English, French, and Latin and Greek" at an otherwise "mediocre grammar school". They were, he said, "...marvelous to me. They encouraged me because they felt I had some gift for languages and should pursue that, and they groomed me."

After graduating with honors in English from the University of Birmingham, West studied at Lincoln College, Oxford, and then as a Smith-Mundt scholar at Columbia University in the United States from 1952 to 1953, from which he graduated with a master's degree. His early life also included a stint in the Royal Air Force from 1954 to 1957, during which he achieved the rank of flight lieutenant. From 1957 he taught English literature at Memorial University of Newfoundland until, in 1962, he began teaching at Pennsylvania State University. It was there in the early 1970s that he met Diane Ackerman, who became his wife.

== Awards ==
Among other honors, West's literary awards have included the American Academy of Arts and Letters award for literature (1985), the Lannan Prize for fiction (1993), and the Grand-Prix Halpèrine-Kaminsky Prize (1993) for best foreign book. West was named a "literary lion" by the New York Public Library and a Chevalier of the Order of Arts and Letters (Ordre des Arts et Lettres) by the French government.

== Analysis ==
West's work is highly varied in form and content. According to reviewer Lore Segal, "He has published poetry, criticism, essays, memoirs (including an extended, sometimes hilarious meditation on learning to swim in middle age) and...novels of an unsettling nonuniformity." Among the many writers who influenced West's work, writes literary critic David Madden, were Jean-Paul Sartre (direct prose, existentialism, alienation, self-definition); Shakespeare (language); Thomas De Quincey (involutes; that is "compound experiences incapable of being disentangled"); Samuel Beckett (word play, nonconforming fiction); and T. S. Eliot (the objective correlative, which West called "an emotional shorthand; a morse for the soul").

According to Madden, West placed high importance on the role of the imagination, as distinguished from convention or dogma, in the creation of fiction and non-fiction. He favored intense flamboyant prose over minimalist writing, which he regarded as generally vapid. His interest in the mutability of what is conventionally thought to be real led to an interest in Latin American fiction and its "penchant for the magical and improbable". Likewise, it led him to scientific studies of "the overwhelming abundance of the universe" from atoms to stars, a friendship with astronomer Carl Sagan, and the writing of The Universe, and Other Fictions and other work expressing amazement at existence.

West told Madden that music was his favorite art and that he usually listened to music while writing. For the writing itself, he used an electric typewriter, which for him had a musical link: "Sometimes I think I am playing the piano, which I cannot do, but I hear rhythms in my tapping and sometimes, Glenn Gould-like, I chant as I go to remind myself what's coming in the next few lines."

West and his novel The Very Rich Hours of Count von Stauffenberg figure prominently in a chapter in Nobel Laureate J. M. Coetzee's book Elizabeth Costello. Coetzee's title character is disturbed by the horrors West describes in his book, which includes vivid descriptions of the deaths, by torture and hanging, of the Germans who tried to assassinate Hitler. In a lecture, "Witness, Silence and Censorship", given in Amsterdam at a conference on evil, she plans to question whether authors should think or write about such things. West (Coetzee's fictitious character), unbeknown to Costello until only hours before her pointed lecture, is also attending the conference. When she seeks him out to warn him that she is using his novel an example of something that should not be written, he listens but says nothing. Author and critic David Lodge, in his review of Elizabeth Costello, says, "For a writer to introduce another, living writer as a character into his fiction, especially in such a prejudicial light, is a very unusual, perhaps unprecedented, thing to do."

== Personal life ==
West retired from teaching in 1995. In 2003, he had a stroke, his second, which his wife, Diane Ackerman, has written about in her book One Hundred Names for Love: A Stroke, a Marriage and the Language of Healing. He died on 18 October 2015 at the age of 85 in Ithaca, New York, from pneumonia. He is survived by his sister, Sheila Forster, and perhaps by a daughter, Amanda, about whom he wrote but with whom he later lost touch.

== Works ==
=== Long fiction ===
- A Quality of Mercy, 1961
- Tenement of Clay, 1965
- Alley Jaggers, 1966
- I'm Expecting to Live Quite Soon, 1970
- Caliban's Filibuster, 1971
- Bela Lugosi's White Christmas, 1972
- Colonel Mint, 1972
- Gala, 1976
- The Very Rich Hours of Count von Stauffenberg, 1980
- Rat Man of Paris, 1986
- The Place in Flowers Where Pollen Rests, 1988
- Lord Byron's Doctor, 1989
- The Women of Whitechapel and Jack the Ripper, 1991
- Love's Mansion, 1992
- The Tent of Orange Mist, 1995
- Sporting with Amaryllis, 1996
- Life With Swan, 1997
- Terrestrials, 1997
- OK: The Corral, the Earps and Doc Holliday, 2000
- The Dry Danube: A Hitler Forgery, 2000
- A Fifth of November, 2001
- Cheops: A Cupboard for the Sun, 2002
- The Immensity of the Here and Now: A Novel of 9.11, 2003

=== Short fiction ===
- The Universe and Other Fictions, 1988

=== Poetry ===
- Poems, 1952
- The Spellbound Horses, 1960
- The Snow Leopard, 1964
- Alphabet Poetry
- Tea with Osiris, 2006

=== Non-fiction ===
==== Books ====
- The Growth of the Novel: Eight Radio Talks as Heard on CBC University of the Air, 1959
- Byron and the Spoiler's Art, 1960 – 2nd ed. 1992
- I, Said the Sparrow, 1963
- The Modern Novel, 1963
- Robert Penn Warren, 1964
- The Wine of Absurdity: Essays in Literature and Consolation, 1966
- Words for a Deaf Daughter, 1969
- Out of My Depths: A Swimmer in the Universe, 1983
- Sheer Fiction, 1987
- Portable People, 1990
- Sheer Fiction, vol. 2, 1991
- Sheer Fiction, vol. 3, 1994
- James Ensor, 1991
- My Mother's Music, 1996
- A Stroke of Genius: Illness and Self-Discovery, 1995
- The Secret Lives of Words, 2000
- Master Class, Scenes From A Fiction Workshop, 2001
- Oxford Days, 2002
- Sheer Fiction, vol. 4, 2004
- My Father's War, 2005
- The Shadow Factory, 2008

==== Articles ====
- West, Paul (January 2009). "Memoir : Cadets : On not flying in the Royal Air Force". Harper's Magazine. Vol. 318, no. 1904. pp. 58–62.
- West, Paul (Summer 2012). "A Feast of Fat Things". The American Scholar. 81 (3): 68–80.

=== Edited text ===
- Byron: A Collection of Critical Essays (Twentieth Century Views series), 1963

== Works cited ==
- Madden, David W. (1993). Understanding Paul West. University of South Carolina. ISBN 0-87249-886-7. OCLC 27815373.
