= Diane Ackerman =

American poet, essayist, and naturalist

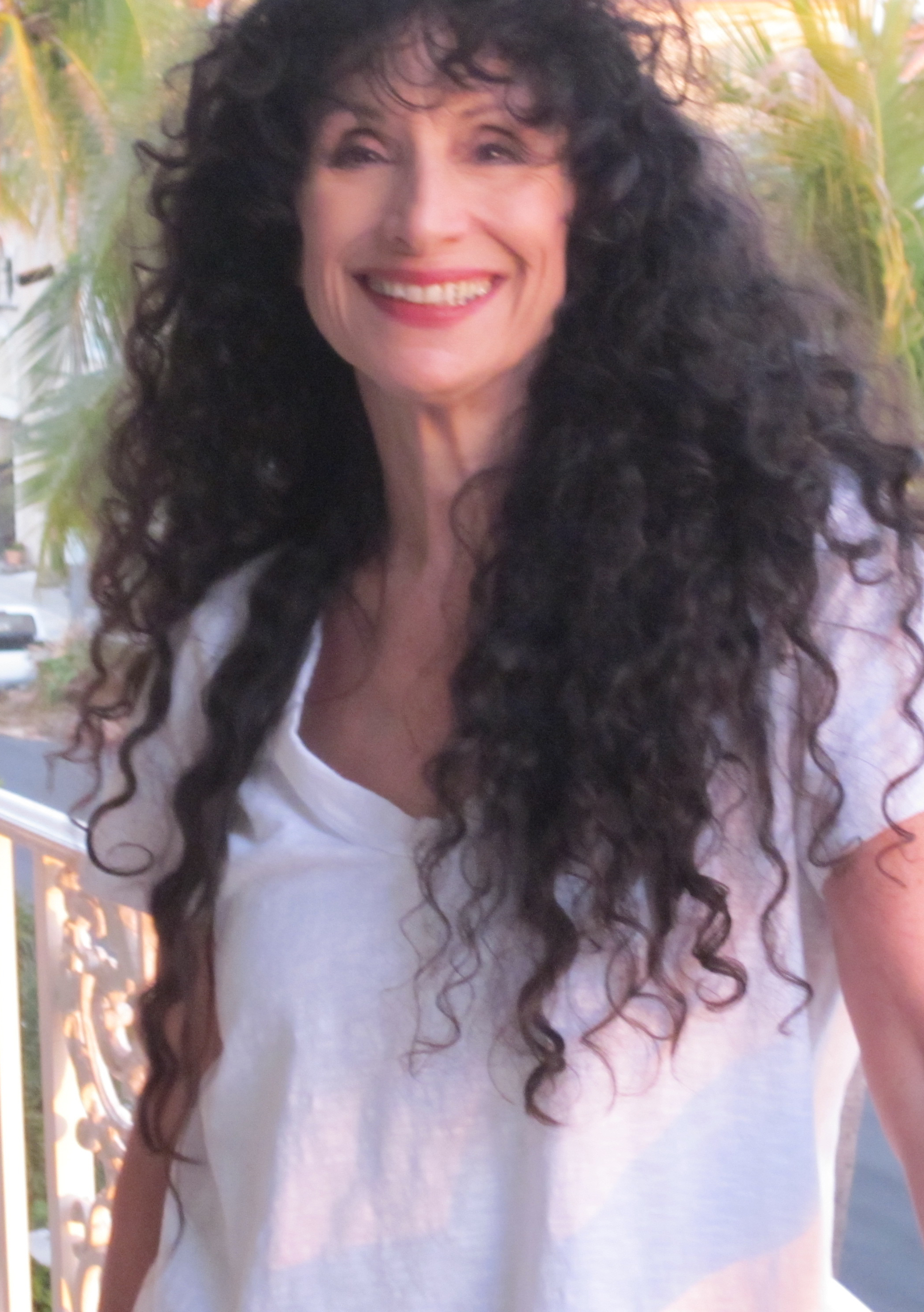
- Ackerman in 2011
- Born: October 7, 1948 (age 78)
- Education: Pennsylvania State University (BA); Cornell University (MA, MFA, PhD)
- Occupation: Author
- Website: www.dianeackerman.com

Diane Ackerman (born October 7, 1948) is an American poet, essayist, and naturalist known for her books and films.

== Education and career ==
Ackerman received a Bachelor of Arts in English from Pennsylvania State University and a Master of Arts, Master of Fine Arts and Ph.D. from Cornell University. Among the members of her dissertation committee was Carl Sagan, an astronomer and the creator of the Cosmos television series. She has taught at a number of universities, including Columbia and Cornell.

Her essays have appeared in The New York Times, Smithsonian, Parade, The New Yorker, National Geographic, and many other journals. Her research has taken her to such diverse locales as Mata Atlantic in Brazil (working with endangered golden lion tamarins), Patagonia (right whales), Hawaii (humpback whales), California (tagging monarch butterflies at their overwintering sites), French Frigate Shoals (monk seals), Toroshima, Japan (short-tailed albatross), Texas (with Bat Conservation International), the Amazon rainforest, and Antarctica (penguins). In 1986, she was a semi-finalist for NASA's Journalist-in-Space Project—this program was cancelled after the Space Shuttle Challenger (carrying Christa McAuliffe as a payload specialist with the Teacher in Space Project) disaster. A molecule has been named after her—dianeackerone—a crocodilian sex pheromone.

A collection of her manuscripts, writings and papers (the Diane Ackerman Papers, 1971–1997—Collection No. 6299) is housed at the Cornell University Library.

== Books ==
Her works of nonfiction include, most recently, The Human Age: The World Shaped by Us, which celebrates nature, human ingenuity and its dominance; her memoir One Hundred Names for Love, about stroke, aphasia, and healing; Dawn Light, a poetic meditation on dawn and awakening; The Zookeeper's Wife, narrative nonfiction set in Warsaw during World War II, a tale of people, animals, and subversive acts of compassion; An Alchemy of Mind about the marvels and mysteries of the brain, based on modern neuroscience; Cultivating Delight, a natural history of her garden; Deep Play, which considers play, creativity, and our need for transcendence; A Slender Thread, about her work as a crisis line counselor; The Rarest of the Rare and The Moon by Whale Light, in which she explores the plight and fascination of endangered animals; A Natural History of Love, a literary tour of love's many facets; On Extended Wings, her memoir of flying; and A Natural History of the Senses, an exploration of the five senses.

Her poetry has been published in leading literary journals, and in collections, including Jaguar of Sweet Laughter: New and Selected Poems. Her first book of poetry, The Planets, A Cosmic Pastoral was gifted by Carl Sagan to Timothy Leary while Leary was imprisoned. Her verse play, Reverse Thunder, celebrates the passionate and tragic life of the 17th century nun, and fellow poet and naturalist, Juana Inés de la Cruz. Ackerman also writes nature books for children.

== Adaptations ==
A movie adaptation of Ackerman's book, The Zookeeper's Wife, starring Jessica Chastain as Antonina Żabińska, was released in the US on March 31, 2017. More photos of the Warsaw Ghetto Uprising of The Zookeeper's Wife may be seen at the website called "The House Under the Crazy Star".

In 1995, Ackerman hosted a five-part Nova miniseries, Mystery of the Senses, based on her book, A Natural History of the Senses. On Extended Wings was adapted for the stage by Norma Jean Giffin, and was performed at the William Redfield Theater in New York City (1987). A musical adaptation (by Paul Goldstaub) of her dramatic poem, Reverse Thunder, was performed at Old Dominion University (1992).

== Awards and honors ==
In 2015, Ackerman's The Human Age won the National Outdoor Book Award in the Natural History Literature category and PEN New England's Henry David Thoreau Prize for nature writing. In 2012, she was a finalist for both a Pulitzer Prize and a National Book Critics Circle Award for One Hundred Names for Love. The Zookeeper's Wife received an Orion Book Award in 2008. She has received a D. Lit from Kenyon College, Guggenheim Fellowship, John Burroughs Nature Award, Lavan Poetry Prize, and has been honored as a Literary Lion of the New York Public Library. Ackerman has had three New York Times bestsellers: The Human Age (2014), The Zookeeper's Wife (2008), and A Natural History of the Senses (1990). She is a Fellow of the New York Institute for the Humanities.

== Personal life ==
Ackerman was married to the novelist Paul West (1930–2015). She lives in Ithaca, New York.

== Selected works ==
The Great Affair
The great affair, the love affair with life,
is to live as variously as possible,
to groom one's curiosity like a high-spirited thoroughbred,
climb aboard, and gallop over the thick, sun-struck hills every day..

It began in mystery, and it will end in mystery,
but what a savage and beautiful country lies in between.

— Diane Ackerman, "found poetry" from A Natural History of the Senses

=== Poetry ===
- The Planets: A Cosmic Pastoral (1976)
- Wife of Light (1978)
- Lady Faustus (1983)
- Reverse Thunder (1988)
- Jaguar of Sweet Laughter: New and Selected Poems (1991) ISBN 9780307763389
- I Praise My Destroyer (1998) ISBN 9780307763372
- Origami Bridges (2002)

=== Non-fiction ===
- Why Leaves Turn Color in the Fall essay by Diane Ackerman, middletownhs.org — A version of this essay was published as a chapter in the 1990 book A Natural History of the Senses in the section on vision.
- Twilight of the Tenderfoot (1980)
- On Extended Wings (1985)
- A Natural History of the Senses (1990) ISBN 9780307763310
- The Moon by Whale Light, and Other Adventures Among Bats and Crocodilians, Penguins and Whales (1991) LCCN 91-52665 ISBN 0394585747
- A Natural History of Love (1994) ISBN 9780307763327
- The Rarest of the Rare (1995) ISBN 0-679-40346-9
- A Slender Thread (1997) ISBN 9780307763365
- Deep Play (1999) ISBN 9780307763334
- Cultivating Delight: A Natural History of My Garden (2002) ISBN 9780786240753
- An Alchemy of Mind: The Marvel and Mystery of the Brain (2004)
- The Zookeeper's Wife: A War Story (2007) ISBN 9780393069358
- Dawn Light: Dancing with Cranes and Other Ways to Start the Day (2009)
- One Hundred Names for Love: A Stroke, a Marriage, and the Language of Healing (2011) ISBN 9780393341744
- The Human Age: The World Shaped By Us (2014) ISBN 9781443423014

=== Children's books ===
- Monk Seal Hideaway (1995)
- Bats: Shadows in the Night (1997)
- Animal Sense (poetry), illustrated by Peter Sis. (2003) ISBN 9780375923845
