= A Different Image =

- Directed by: Alile Sharon Larkin
- Written by: Alile Sharon Larkin
- Produced by: Alile Sharon Larkin; Women Make Movies
- Starring: Margòt Saxton-Federella; Michael Adisa Anderson
- Cinematography: Charles Burnett
- Edited by: Alile Sharon Larkin; Charles Burnett^{Ref?}
- Music by: Munyungo Jackson
- Release date: 1982
- Running time: 52 min.
- Country: United States
- Language: English

A Different Image is a 1982 American film that was directed, written, and edited by Alile Sharon Larkin that explores body image and societal beauty standards through the eyes of a young Black woman on a journey towards self-worth.

== Summary ==
Alana (Margot Saxton-Federlla), an art student, explores sexuality, Western ideals of beauty, and her own self-worth in 1980's Los Angeles. Vincent (Adisa Anderson), her long-time friend, feels pressured to turn their platonic relationship into a sexual one which further intensified Alana's frustration with western, patriarchal beauty standards and gender norms.

== Cast ==
- Margòt Saxton-Federella as Alana
- Michael Adisa Anderson as Vincent

== Production ==
Creating a Different Image: Portrait of Alile Sharon Larkin is a 1989 documentary about the making of A Different Image

== Reception ==
The film is considered as a groundbreaking foray into a realistic character portrait of a young Black woman. Kevin Thomas of the Los Angeles Times heralded it as "...extraordinary, a fresh and clear expression of an acute sensibility."

=== Awards and recognition ===
- First Prize, Black American Cinema Society Award
- Official Selection, London Black Film Festival
- Best Production of 1981, Black Filmmaker Foundation
- Runner Up, Best Short Film, Filmex
- Official Selection, the 2011 L. A. Rebellion: Creating New Cinema

=== Screenings ===
- UCLA's L.A. Rebellion Film Series, UCLA Hammer Museum, 2011
- Madeline Anderson Shorts, Brooklyn Academy of Music, 2013
- Afterimage: Madeline Anderson, Berkeley Art Museum, 2016
- One Way or Another: Black Women's Cinema, 1970–1991, Brooklyn Academy of Music, 2017

== Preservation ==
The Black Film Center/Archive preserved A Different Image, which included 16mm original color reversal A/B rolls and full-coat magnetic track elements. They produced a 16mm color internegative, a soundtrack negative, and two new 16mm projection prints.

The script of the film was published in a 1991 compilation of collected works called Screenplays of the African American Experience.

== See also ==
- L.A. Rebellion
- Black Women Filmmakers
