= A Natural History of the Senses =

1990 book by Diane Ackerman

- First edition
- Cover artist: John William Waterhouse, Soul of the Rose – 1908
- Language: English
- Publisher: Random House
- Publication date: 1990
- ISBN: 0679735666

The Great Affair
The great affair, the love affair with life,
is to live as variously as possible,
to groom one's curiosity like a high-spirited thoroughbred,
climb aboard, and gallop over the thick, sun-struck hills every day..

It began in mystery, and it will end in mystery,
but what a savage and beautiful country lies in between.

— Diane Ackerman, "found poetry" from A Natural History of the Senses

A Natural History of the Senses is a 1990 non-fiction book by American author, poet, and naturalist Diane Ackerman. In this book, Ackerman examines both the science of how the different senses work, and the varied means by which different cultures have sought to stimulate the senses. The book was the inspiration for the five-part Nova miniseries Mystery of the Senses (1995) in which Ackerman appeared as the presenter.

“What is most amazing is not how our senses span distance or cultures, but how they span time. Our senses connect us intimately to the past, connect us in ways that most of our cherished ideas never could.”
