= Ariyan A. Johnson =

American actress

- Born: Ariyan Annette Johnson; New York City, U.S.
- Education: LaGuardia High School of Performing Arts
- Occupations: Actress; television director; dancer; choreographer
- Years active: 1991–present
- Children: 2
- Website: ariyanjohnson.com

Ariyan Annette Johnson, credited as Ariyan Johnson, is an American actress, television director, dancer and choreographer. Johnson is known for her role as Chantel Mitchell in the 1992 indie drama film Just Another Girl on the I.R.T. She also portrayed Aisha on the second season of The WB comedy series The Steve Harvey Show (1997–98).

== Early life ==
Born in Brooklyn, New York's Bedford–Stuyvesant neighborhood to artistically inclined parents, Johnson grew up training in the arts. Her father, a painter and contemporary artist, and her mother, an actress and dancer, were both educators who owned a theatrical dance company. Johnson attended LaGuardia High School of Performing Arts, where she majored in dance and film. She later attended Alvin Ailey American Dance Theater, Martha Graham Center of Contemporary Dance, and 92nd St. Y Harkness Dance Center.

== Award nomination ==
Johnson was nominated for the Independent Spirit Award for Best Female Lead in 1994, for her role as Chantel Mitchell in the film Just Another Girl on the I.R.T.

== Filmography ==
=== Film ===
Year	Title	Role	Notes
1992	Just Another Girl on the I.R.T.	Chantel Mitchell	
1998	Bulworth	Tanya	
1999	The General's Daughter	Prvt. Robbins	
2000	Something to Sing About	Praise Dancer	Television film

=== Television ===
Year	Title	Role	Notes
1995	Law & Order	Angel	Episode: "Hot Pursuit"
1997–98	The Steve Harvey Show	Aisha	Recurring cast: season 2
1998	L.A. Doctors	Tiana Edwards	Episode: "A Prayer for the Lying"
2002	For the People	-	Episode: "The Double Standard"
2003	Static Shock	Tamara Lawrence (voice)	Episode: "The Usual Suspect"
2004	JAG	Private Michelle Boyer	Episode: "Hard Time"
2004	Strong Medicine	-	Episode: "Positive Results"
2006	ER	Tamara	Episode: "Split Decisions"

=== Video games ===
Year	Title	Role	Notes
2006	Superman Returns	The Citizens of Metropolis	Electronic Arts
