= Water Ritual 1: An Urban Rite of Purification =

Water Ritual #1: An Urban Rite of Purification
- Directed by: Barbara McCullough
- Written by: Barbara McCullough
- Produced by: Barbara McCullough
- Starring: Yolanda Vidato
- Cinematography: Ben Caldwell; Peter Blue; Roho
- Edited by: Barbara McCullough
- Music by: Don Cherry
- Release dates: 1979; 2013 (restoration)
- Running time: 6 minutes
- Country: United States
- Language: English

Water Ritual #1: An Urban Rite of Purification is a 1979 short experimental film directed, produced, written, and edited by Barbara McCullough. It is McCullough's first film and is generally considered a pioneering experimental film by an African-American woman. The title card is: "In West African societies, a story-teller charged with maintaining legacies, histories, knowledge and traditions in oral form."

== Premise ==
Milanda (Yolanda Vidato) prepares for and partakes in a purification ritual.

== Themes ==
The primary theme of the film is about African-American women within the African Diaspora. The use of surreal lighting and unclear narrative convey the confusion and displacement experienced by African-Americans. Milanda walks through a desolate wasteland with a confident detachment, representing African-American women's resilience despite harsh racial inequalities and a bleak outlook. The titular ritual augments this trope: Milanda's expulsion of clothing, water, and waste invoke African diaspora cosmology. David E. James wrote that the film is an "...inter-artistic work that combines collage, the avant-garde jazz of the Los Angeles native Don Cherry, and themes of history, folklore, magic, and the specificity of black feminism." In an interview, McCullough explained that the film "is really about touching [an] ancestral past."

== Production ==
McCullough was inspired to make the film when her close friend had a mental breakdown. The film was initially shot on black and white film. It was then colored to mimic an infrared color film strip.
