= Enter the Dangerous Mind =

- Directed by: Youssef Delara; Victor Teran
- Written by: Victor Teran
- Starring: Jake Hoffman; Nikki Reed; Thomas Dekker; Jason Priestley; Gina Rodriguez; Ana Claudia Talancón; Noel Gugliemi; John Earl Jelks; Scott Bakula
- Cinematography: Ben Kufrin
- Edited by: Youssef Delara; John Wesley Whitton
- Music by: Reza Safinia
- Production companies: Cima Productions; Vedette Finance
- Distributed by: Variance Films; GoDigital; Well Go USA Entertainment; Highest Cinemas
- Release dates: March 11, 2013 (SXSW); February 6, 2015
- Running time: 88 minutes
- Country: United States
- Language: English
- Budget: $3 million

Enter the Dangerous Mind, also known under its original title of Snap, is a 2013 psychological thriller film directed by Youssef Delara and Victor Teran. It had its world premiere on 11 March 2013 at the South by Southwest Film Festival, but was only released in movie theaters on 6 February 2015. Enter the Dangerous Mind stars Jake Hoffman as an EDM musician who falls into madness after his relationship with a beautiful woman (Nikki Reed) turns sour.

== Synopsis ==
The plot revolves around EDM musician Jim, who falls into madness after his relationship with a beautiful woman, Wendy, turns sour.

In his spare time, Jim makes his own dubstep mixes, as he sees them as an outlet to express himself in ways that he is otherwise incapable of achieving. He's constantly harangued by his roommate Jake, who views Jim as a loser and wants him to do more than just hang around the apartment all day.

It's through his work at a women's shelter that he meets Wendy and the two initially begin to form a connection as they both share a love of dubstep and because Wendy recognizes that they share a lot of the same issues in life. This relationship proves to be short-lived, after Jim prematurely ejaculates during a date. Jake is sure that Wendy will only spread the story around and ruin Jim's life by holding him up as an object of ridicule. With few other options, Jim begins to take more and more of Jake's advice, which sets him on a far darker path than he could have expected.

== Cast ==
- Jake Hoffman as Jim Whitman
- Nikki Reed as Wendy
- Scott Bakula as Kevin
- Gina Rodriguez as Adrienne
- Thomas Dekker as Jake
- Jason Priestley as Dr. Dubrow
- Noel Gugliemi as Detective Salinas
- Joe Egender as Steve
- Skyler Brigmann as Young Jim
- Joseph Julian Soria as College Student
- Melanie Hawkins as Deborah
- William Leon as Young Boy
- Jenn Liu as Amy
- Jessica Tyler Brown as Cate
- Ana Claudia Talancon

== Production ==
Teran and Delara have cited the movies Taxi Driver and The Shining as influences for Enter the Dangerous Mind. Filming took place over 25 days.

The film was originally titled Snap.

== Release ==
The film had its world premiere on 11 March 2013 at the South by Southwest Film Festival and had its theatrical release on 6 February 2015.

== Reception ==
Critical reception for Enter the Dangerous Mind was negative, holding a 9% rating on Rotten Tomatoes based on 11 reviews with an average score of 3.3/10.

However, Screen Daily and Film School Rejects both praised the movie, and both outlets praised the film for its characterizations and soundtrack.
