= Teshome Gabriel =

American cinema scholar and professor (1939–2010)

Teshome H. Gabriel (September 24, 1939 – June 14, 2010) was an Ethiopian-born American cinema scholar and professor at the UCLA School of Theater, Film and Television in Los Angeles. Gabriel was considered an expert on cinema and film of Africa and the developing world. A colleague at UCLA, Vinay Lal, noted that Gabriel was "one of the first scholars to theorize in a critical fashion about Third World cinema."

Gabriel was born in Ticho, Ethiopia, on September 24, 1939. He immigrated to the United States in 1962. He obtained a bachelor's degree in political science in 1967 and received a master's degree in educational media in 1969, both from the University of Utah. He continued his education at UCLA, where he earned a master's degree in theater arts in 1976 and a doctorate in film and television studies in 1979.

Gabriel began lecturing at UCLA in 1974 and became an assistant professor at the UCLA School of Theater, Film and Television in 1981.

Gabriel's books included Third Cinema in the Third World: The Aesthetics of Liberation in 1982 and Third Cinema: Exploration of Nomadic Aesthetics & Narrative Communities. He co-edited Otherness and the Media: The Ethnography of the Imagined and the Imaged, which was published in 1993. He served as the editor of Emergences: Journal for the Study of Media and Composite Cultures. Additionally, Gabriel founded Tuwaf (Light), an Ethiopian journal on fine arts which is published in Amharic. He served on Tuwaf's editorial board from 1987 until 1991.

Teshome Gabriel died of cardiac arrest on June 14, 2010, at Kaiser Permanente Panorama City Medical Center in Panorama City, Los Angeles at the age of 70. He was survived by his wife, Maaza Woldemusie; daughter, Mediget; and son, Tsegaye.
