= Mystery of the Senses =

- Genre: Documentary
- Presented by: Diane Ackerman
- Composer: Startled Insects
- Country of origin: United States
- Original language: English
- No. of episodes: 5

Production
- Running time: 55 minutes
- Production companies: WGBH-TV; WETA-TV

Original release
- Network: PBS
- Release: February 19 – February 22, 1995

Mystery of the Senses is a five-part Nova miniseries, based on the book A Natural History of the Senses by Diane Ackerman, who also presents the documentary. Each episode covers one of the traditional five senses: hearing, sight, smell, taste, and touch. The series premiered on PBS on February 19, 1995.

== Reception ==
Alan Rich of Variety said that "Ackerman has fashioned an absorbing tapestry of media essays on human sensuality". Walter Goodman of The New York Times stated that "much of the information ... is fresh", but "the programs meander down dull paths; the scientific material tends to be delivered in clumps that are hard to absorb".

Ken Ringle of The Washington Post was not impressed, and described the series as "distracted, disorganized, frequently trivial and irritatingly self-indulgent". He went on to say that "instead of exploring our senses' role in the natural world", the programs "tends to celebrate instead the way corporations seduce them artificially for profit". Despite the mostly unfavorable review, Ringle did concede that "some moments in the series are pure gold".

== See also ==
- List of NOVA episodes
