= Reginald Robinson =

Reginald R. Robinson
- Born: October 19, 1972 (age 53); Chicago, Illinois, U.S.
- Genres: Jazz, ragtime
- Occupation: Musician
- Instrument: Piano
- Years active: 1992 – present
- Label: Independent
- Website: www.reginaldrrobinson.com

Reginald R. Robinson (born October 19, 1972) is an American jazz and ragtime pianist. In 2004, he received a MacArthur Genius Grant.

== Biography ==
Robinson was raised in Chicago. A self-taught musician, Robinson's love for ragtime began in the 7th grade His mother purchased a piano and he spent the next three years submerged in the self study of music. In 1988 Robinson took lessons with Theodore Bargman at the American Conservatory of Music in downtown Chicago. He also studied sight-reading and began to compose music in various styles including ragtime piano.

In 1992 he was introduced to pianist Jon Weber; who helped him make a professional demo of his compositions and arranged for his first public performance at The Green Mill. In December 1993, Robinson was a guest on "Piano Jazz" with Marian McPartland. In 2004 Robinson won the John D. and Catherine T. MacArthur Foundation "genius award".

== Discography ==
- Man Out of Time (self-released, 2007)
- Reflections (self-released, 2010)
- Euphonic Sounds (Delmark, 1998)
- Sounds in Silhouette (Delmark, 1994)
- The Strongman (Delmark, 1993)
