= Alile Sharon Larkin =

American film director

- Born: Sharon Larkin; May 6, 1953 (age 73); Chicago, Illinois, U.S.
- Education: University of Southern California (BA); University of California, Los Angeles (MFA)
- Occupations: Film director; producer; screenwriter
- Years active: 1979–present

Alile Sharon Larkin (born May 6, 1953) is an American film producer, writer and director. She is associated with the L.A. Rebellion (also known as the Los Angeles School of Black Filmmakers), which is said to have "collectively imagined and created a Black cinema against the conventions of Hollywood and Blaxploitation film." Larkin is considered to be part of the second wave (or generation) of these revolutionary black filmmakers, along with Julie Dash and Billy Woodberry. Larkin also co-founded the Black Filmmakers Collective.

== Background and education ==
Larkin was born in Chicago on May 6, 1953. She received a Bachelor of Arts degree in Humanities in the Creative Writing program at the University of Southern California, graduating in 1975. Larkin was then enrolled as one of the original members of the Ethno-Communications program at UCLA, until it disbanded. Larkin then registered at UCLA's prestigious film school in the Motion Picture/Television Program, graduating with a Master of Fine Arts degree in 1982. In 1991 Larkin graduated with a Master of Education degree from California State University in Los Angeles, and went on to become an educator for the next 25 years.

== Career ==
While at UCLA, Larkin directed two 16mm short films. Her first film The Kitchen (1975), tells the story of a Black woman's mental breakdown, and compares her life in a mental ward to that of someone in prison, looking at the pressures and discrimination she faced that brought about her mental undoing. Her next film, Your Children Come Back to You (1979), explores the issue of the assimilation of African Americans into a larger community. The film confronts issues of economic and social inequality, presenting them from a child's point of view. Your Children was followed by the film for which she is perhaps best known, A Different Image, which she completed in 1982. This film explores the complexities of a platonic relationship between a free-spirited young woman and the young man who is her best friend. A retrospective of her works, including a documentary on the making of "A Different Image," were set to screen on Friday, December 2, 2011, as part of a major film series, "L.A. Rebellion: Creating a New Black Cinema," part of Pacific Standard Time: Art in L.A. 1945–1980.

After graduating from UCLA, Larkin produced a series of projects, including the children's story, Dredlocks and the Three Bears (1991), which has been called "an extremely playful and yet undeniably political" animated re-imagining of the story of Goldilocks with a Black female protagonist. Her upcoming project is a children's music DVD called 'Tie Dye', which is currently in production.

Larkin is also a published writer. Her article "Black Women Filmmakers Defining Ourselves: Feminism in Our Own Voice" was published in 1988 in E. Deidre Pribram's Female Spectators: Looking at film and television, which was part of an informal 13-book series called "Questions for Feminism". Her screenplay for A Different Image (1982) was published in 1991 in a book of collected works from six different independent filmmakers, called Screenplays of the African American Experience.

Along with other members of the L.A. Rebellion, Larkin is the subject of an upcoming documentary from director Zeinabu Irene Davis called Spirits of Rebellion: Black Cinema at UCLA.

== Cinematic style and influence ==
Larkin often uses a non-linear narrative style in her films, and her cinematic style has been described as using "collage and abrupt editing, [which] evokes a self-reflexive form that disrupts the spectator's pleasurable and seamless identification with story and protagonist." Larkin has been described as a filmmaker who has "greatly contributed to the advances of black women in the ongoing struggle for representation". She is also considered to be among the most influential African American independent filmmakers, a group that has "committed to developing a film language to respectfully express cultural particularity and Black thought."

== Filmography ==
Films
Year	Title	Role(s)	Distributor	Screenings
1975	The Kitchen	Director, Writer, Producer, Editor		
1979	Your Children Come Back to You	Director, Writer, Producer, Editor	Women Make Movies	2011: L.A. Rebellion: Creating a New Black Cinema
1982	A Different Image	Director	Women Make Movies	2011: L.A. Rebellion: Creating a New Black Cinema; 2003: Los Angeles School Festival at UC Irvine; 1982: Black Talkies on Parade Film Festival
1984	My Dream is to Marry an African Prince	Producer		
1986	What Color is God?	Producer		
1987	Miss Fluci Moses	Director		
1991	Dreadlocks and the Three Bears	Director, Writer, Producer		2011: L.A. Rebellion: Creating a New Black Cinema
1998	Mz Medusa	Director		
2000	The Blessing Way	Cast		

== Awards and recognition ==
- 1982: 1st Prize, Black American Cinema Society Award for A Different Image
