= Hood film =

Film genre originating in the United States

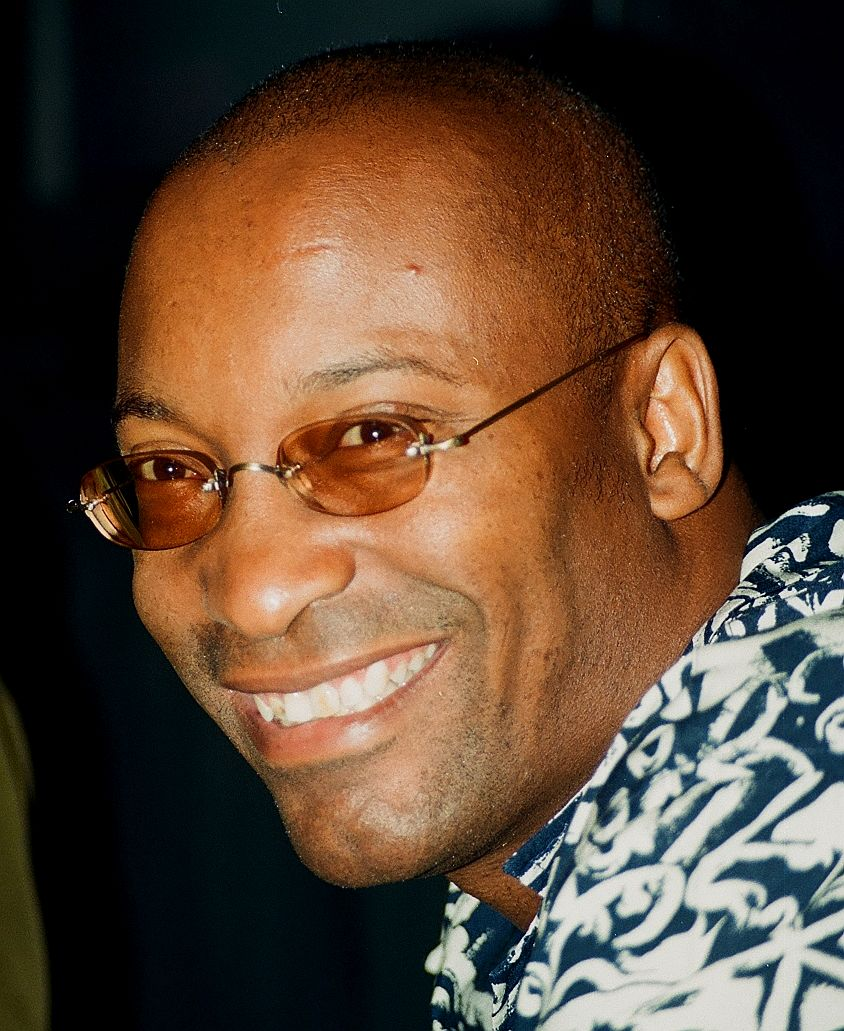
- Director John Singleton, one of the pioneers of the genre
- Years active: 1990s - 2000s
- Location: United States
- Major figures: Hughes Brothers, Ernest Dickerson, F. Gary Gray, Spike Lee, John Singleton, Mario Van Peebles
- Influences: Blaxploitation, L.A. Rebellion, Mexploitation, Race film

Hood film is a film genre originating in the United States, which features aspects of urban African American or Hispanic American culture. The genre is generally considered to have been popularized in the 1990s with films from noted directors such as John Singleton, Mario Van Peebles, F. Gary Gray, the Hughes Brothers, and Spike Lee. The genre has been identified as a sub-genre of the gangster film genre.

== Criteria ==
Characteristics include hip hop music (including gangsta rap), street gangs, racial discrimination, organized crime/gangster, gang affiliation scenes, drug use and trafficking, and the problems of young people coming of age or struggling amid the relative poverty and violent neighborhoods. Hood films tell predominantly masculine stories, however some films within the genre (such as Set It Off) have women-focused stories.

=== Non-American hood films ===
Jamaican films of this genre has been made, such as, Shottas and The Harder They Come. City of God, Carandiru and City of Men are Brazilian films depicting life in the favelas of Rio de Janeiro. British films of this genre have also been made such as Babylon, Small Faces, Rage, Storm Damage, Bullet Boy, Layer Cake, Kidulthood, Deadmeat, Adulthood, and the parody Anuvahood. The French films La Haine and Ma 6-T va crack-er are part of this genre as well. A Puerto Rican film of this genre Talento de Barrio, has been made. The Canadian films Rude and Soul Survivor are also examples of this genre.

== Critical definitions ==
Critic Murray Forman notes that the "spatial logic" of hip-hop culture, with heavy emphasis on place-based identity, locates "black youth urban experience within an environment of continual proximate danger," and this quality defines the hood film. In a 1992 essay in Cineaction, Canadian critic Rinaldo Walcott identified the hood film's primary concerns as issues of masculinity and "(re)gaining manhood for black men."

== History ==
Early notable releases in the hood film genre include Colors (1988) and Do the Right Thing (1989). The latter in particular has been credited with ushering in the hood film zeitgeist in the 1990s due to its popular success.

Critics such as Murray Forman have credited the popular emergence of hood-films with the simultaneous emergence of gangsta rap as a popular music genre in the 1990s, wherein the hood film genre reached the height of its popularity due to the acclaim of the films New Jack City, Boyz n the Hood, Juice, the Sundance-winning Straight Out of Brooklyn and Menace II Society. Gangsta rap and hood films formed a symbiotic relationship, and many rappers of the era appeared in popular hood films at the time. With the plethora of films both dramas and comedies, hood films of the 1990s are in a sense neo-Blaxploitation films and Mexploitation films. The genre has also been parodied with such films as Don't Be a Menace to South Central While Drinking Your Juice in the Hood and Friday.

By the mid-1990s, the hood film popular zeitgeist largely came to an end.

However, hood films would continue to be released through the late 1990s and 2000s, albeit on a smaller scale and poorer box-office results. These hood films often have low production costs. Celeste A. Fisher credited this decline to general fatigue felt towards the genre, due to the lack of diversity in "images, settings, and themes". Many low-budget, straight-to-DVD hood films were released in the late 1990s and through the 2000s, such as I'm Bout It, Leprechaun in the Hood and Hood of the Living Dead. Many of these films stripped back the social and political messaging that was present in their 1990s forebears, while continuing to capitalise on the 'hood film' formula.

On the contrary, while hood films were falling out of popularity in the United States, it would experience a brief popular emergence in the UK led by British filmmakers such as Noel Clarke. Bullet Boy, released in 2004, is generally recognised to be the first notable example of a British hood film. Kidulthood, released in 2006, is credited with popularising the British hood film genre, leading to a swathe of imitators in the years following. By the mid-2010s, the British hood film genre largely faded out of mainstream popularity, however, a TV series which carried heavy influences from the genre, Top Boy, gained international acclaim during this period.

The mid-2010s saw a small revival of the genre, with popular releases such as Girlhood and Straight Outta Compton. This wave of hood films was dubbed a 'rebirth' of the genre by Dazed.

== Criticism ==
Hood films have received criticism for alleged glorification of criminality and gangsterism. The genre has also been criticised for perpetuating the idea that young, black males are violent, sexist, or gangsters, despite the well-meaning intent behind some films within the genre to bring awareness to issues such as poverty, political alienation and the varying effects of institutional racism. Norman K. Denzin explained:

These realistic social-problem texts fuelled conservative racist discourse. They helped fearful white Americans blame blacks for the problems of the inner city. They suggested that blacks caused their own problems. The problems of the ghetto were not shared by the larger society.

Research findings have noted that positive representations of women in the genre are almost non-existent, and women are often depicted in degrading roles.

== Legacy ==
The Academy Award–nominated classics Do the Right Thing and Boyz n the Hood were each inducted into the National Film Registry.

The latter film topped the "Top Black Films of All Times" poll in the November 1998 issue of Ebony magazine.

== See also ==
- African American cinema
- African-American neighborhood
- L.A. Rebellion – alternative independent black cinema during the 1970s through 1990s
- Message picture
- Social realism
