= Fragrance (disambiguation) =

A fragrance is a chemical compound that has a smell or odor.

Fragrance may also refer to:

- Princess Fragrance, a character in the novel The Book and the Sword
- The Fragrance Foundation, a non-profit organization
- Perfume, a mixture used to give an agreeable scent
