= Ben Caldwell (filmmaker) =

American film director

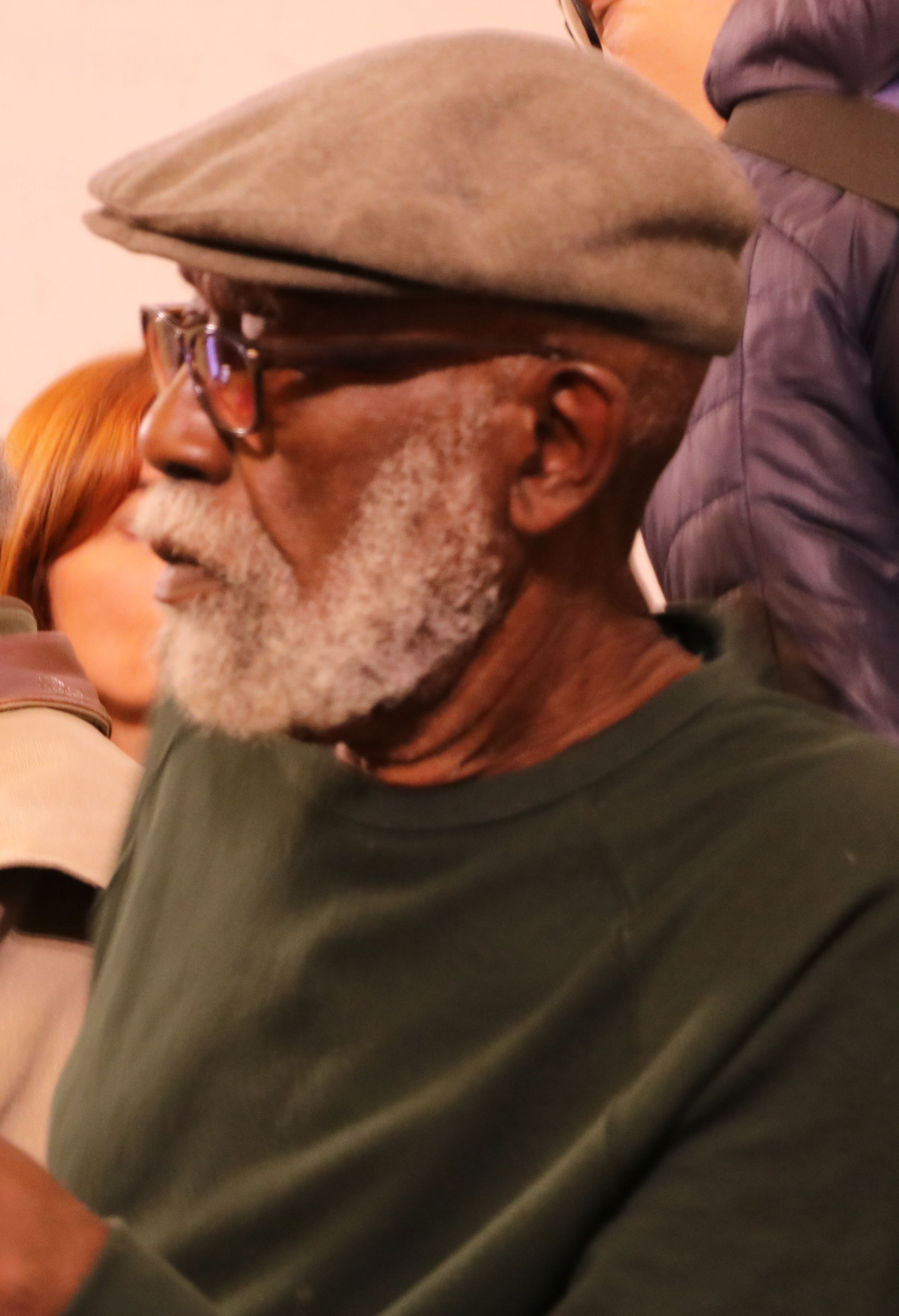
- Caldwell in 2019.
- Born: 1945 (age 80–81)
- Education: UCLA
- Occupations: Filmmaker, Educator
- Years active: 1973 - present
- Style: Experimental, Documentary

Ben Caldwell (1945) is a Los Angeles-based arts educator and independent filmmaker.

Caldwell developed an affinity for film helping his grandfather, a projector, at a small theater in New Mexico. After serving in Vietnam, Caldwell studied photography and other media, followed by an M.F.A in film. Caldwell studied filmmaking at UCLA, alongside a group of young African American independent filmmakers known as The L.A. Rebellion." Caldwell contributed largely to the L.A. Rebellion Movement creating films that focused on black culture in Los Angeles, California. At UCLA, Caldwell produced, wrote, directed, filmed, and edited his most revered piece “Madea." Caldwell taught several years at CalArts and became a major force in CAP (Community Arts Partnership). In 1984, he founded KAOS Network, a community arts center in L.A,'s Leimert Park providing training on digital arts, media arts and multi-media.

== Early life and education ==
A native of New Mexico, Ben Caldwell was first introduced to the visual arts at an early age. As a youth, Caldwell would help his grandfather project movies at a small theater in New Mexico. Working with his grandfather allowed Caldwell to develop an affinity for filmmaking. His early exposure to film inspired him to pursue an education and a career in filmmaking.

Working with his grandfather was not the inspiration that pushed Caldwell into filmmaking. During his childhood, war movies were very popular and they peaked young Caldwell's fascination. While enrolled in a two-year animation course under the Disney company, Caldwell was drafted and sent to Vietnam. Caldwell decided to buy a camera while in Japan so that he could photograph his counterparts in the military and document what soldiers faced in the Vietnam War. He has hundreds of pictures which he may or may not incorporate into a future project about war and the soldiers that suffer from combat. Taking pictures while in the military not only allowed Caldwell to document one aspect of the war, but it also gave him the opportunity to familiarize himself with the camera.

After serving his time in the military, Caldwell then enrolled in courses at Phoenix College in Arizona studying photography and other forms of media. After collaborating with other students and professors, Caldwell was encouraged to pursue an M.F.A in film. Professors at Phoenix noticed that Caldwell was attempting to tell stories with his still photography and suggested that he look into studying film. Caldwell then applied and was accepted into many different Masters programs, and decided to attend UCLA. Caldwell studied filmmaking at UCLA, receiving his M.F.A in 1976. He studied film alongside Charles Burnett, Julie Dash and Billy Woodberry, as part of a group of young artists who were to change African American independent filmmaking — a cultural phenomenon sometimes called "The L.A. Rebellion." Caldwell contributed largely to the L.A. Rebellion Movement creating films that focused on black culture in Los Angeles, California.

The idea of black film students attending UCLA was not embraced by everyone. Those who opposed their presence, did not hesitate to express their deeply rooted discontent. As a result, the L. A. Rebellion was born. Black filmmakers were making their voices heard through their art. Much of their art consisted of pieces that focused on politics that effected the black community, praised black culture, and pushed for unification among the human race. When asked in an interview, Ben Caldwell stated that the L. A. Rebellion set out to “emancipate the image” of black people.

While studying film at UCLA, Caldwell produced, wrote, directed, filmed, and edited his most revered piece “Madea." This film explores the development of a child's mind during gestation. At the time that he wrote this piece, Caldwell was entertaining the possibility of there being another Earth in a parallel universe. When he was attending school in Arizona, Caldwell created a still photography piece which equated the black woman's body to Earth. Once he began studying film, Caldwell adapted his still photography project into the short film. Over the course of his career, Caldwell has made other experimental shorts such as "I & I: An African Allegory" and "Water Ritual #1: An Urban Rite of Purification," which would fall under the category of Experimental Documentary. The shorts that he has written and/or worked on have focused on social issues that directly effect the black community. In a time when Blaxploitation dominated the black film industry, Caldwell and other black visionaries had different stories to tell.

== Career ==
Caldwell taught several years at CalArts and became a major force in CAP (Community Arts Partnership). In 1984, he founded KAOS Network, a community arts center dedicated to providing training on digital arts, media arts and multi-media, at the heart of Leimert Park, historic center of the Los Angeles jazz culture, now hosting a diverse multi-ethnic multimedia arts center. KAOS Network was designed to empower the youth of the community and is the only organization of its kind in South Central Los Angeles where inner-city youths can participate in hands-on courses in video production, animation, website development, video teleconferencing, CD-ROM production, and use of the Internet. KAOS is also home to WORDshop, a weekly workshop for hip-hop artists, dancers, singers, and visual artists. Each week, over 150 youths participate in workshops and programs at the center. In addition to these workshops, KAOS Network has videotaped community events and produced documentaries for the state of California. KAOS Network is committed to creating a community of young people who are dedicated to learning new technologies, acquiring employable skills, and participating in digital arts and new media training.

“For Whose Entertainment” is another piece by Caldwell that is yet to be distributed. Co-Produced by Artie Ivie, this film is a critique of Black comedians and their work. Caldwell poses the question of who Black comedians are attempting to appeal to and entertain the most, Black audiences or white audiences? Caldwell acknowledges this piece as a piece full of anger and discontent with the social norms surrounding Black comedy and has yet to share it with others. Howard University has expressed interest in using this film as a means to show film students the mixed feelings about Black comedy.

When asked why he decided to go in a more political direction with his work as opposed to creating mainstream type films, such as Romance or Action films, Caldwell stated that he does not aim to create political films. With his work, Caldwell aims to create films that people will have to watch more than once in order to truly understand them. Caldwell also creates films where the audience notices something new each time they watch them. Caldwell does not want to make the standard Hollywood-like films, but instead wants to create films the way Black and African musicians make music. Caldwell strives to capture the natural flavor of Black music and translate that into films. Ben Caldwell states that the focus of his films is not political; they are instead cultural. By way of his art, Caldwell hopes to bring people closer together, explore, and preserve the unique culture of African Diaspora.

Ben Caldwell has plans for the future that are in the works right now. He and his company are working to create autonomous cars that will not only drive themselves, but will also equip the driver and their passengers with films that they can watch. This will not only revolutionize driving, but it will also revolutionize the way audiences consume media. In addition to that, Caldwell is working on repurposing old phone booths around Los Angeles, making them stations where people can Skype with one another. Caldwell hopes to utilize the new Metro line that will be constructed by 2020. The Metro line will go directly through South Los Angeles, which is still a predominantly Black portion of the city, and therefore, Caldwell aims to use it as a host for his multimedia projects, creating a platform for young artists to showcase their work to those who travel through their neighborhoods.

== Filmography ==
- Medea (1973)
- I & I: An African Allegory (1979)
- Water Ritual 1: An Urban Rite of Purification (1979)
- Gidget Meets Hondo (1980)
- Festival Of Mask (1982)
- The Snake In My Bed (1995)
- Eyewitness: Reflections of Malcolm X & O.A.A.U. (2006)
- I Build The Tower (2006)
- Leimert Park: Sankofa Project (2007)
- La Buena Vida (2008)
