= Leslie Harris (director) =

American film director (born 1960)

- Born: 1960 (age 65–66); Cleveland, Ohio, U.S.
- Occupations: Film director, screenwriter, producer

Leslie Harris is an American film director, screenwriter and producer.

== Early life ==
Director, screenwriter and producer Leslie Harris was born in Cleveland, Ohio in 1960. Harris earned a degree from Denison University, earning a B.F.A. in Studio Arts. She also studied abroad in Aix-En-Provence, France during her junior year. Her early film work consisted of animations and live action shorts.

== Career ==
Harris moved to New York in 1982 where she began working in the advertising industry, including for major advertising firms such as FCB and Saatchi & Saatchi Worldwide (both members of the American Association of Advertising Agencies). Harris soon grew frustrated with the limits of the advertising industry and moved into directing commercials. Harris established her own commercials company catering to the small business community such as the "Exceptional Women of Color Hair Salon". Harris took on temp work to pay the bills, writing her feature screenplays in between answering phone calls. She also worked evenings at "Film/Video Arts", a nonprofit film and video rental and post-production facility where she had access to equipment she could use to create her films. Harris attributes her mother's advice, motivation, and encouragement from a young age to her success: her mother always insisted that women can achieve any career goal. With her 1992 film Just Another Girl on the I.R.T., Leslie Harris became the first African-American woman director, writer, producer and executive producer to win a Special Jury Prize at The Sundance Film Festival for Best Feature Film. Harris has lectured on filmmaking and film at Tulane University, Wellesley College, Portland State University, Columbia University and the Canadian Film Institute. Harris has also taught both screenwriting and film production classes as both a full-time and adjunct professor at New York University Tisch School of the Arts.

== Just Another Girl on the I.R.T. ==
In an interview with Charlie Rose in 1993, Harris discussed her frustration with most mainstream coming-of-age films, noting that most films of this type are about young men, while young women are portrayed as an appendage to the central male character. "I actually wanted to bring the female characters to the foreground and deal with issues that really deal with young women coming of age in the '90s," Harris said. Harris wanted to see a young African-American woman's coming-of-age story, from a female perspective, and set out to make it herself, stating that it's important that we see women both in front of and behind the camera. The story of Just Another Girl on the I.R.T. was well-researched with the help of The Brooklyn Teen Pregnancy Center; Harris conducted interviews with counselors, teen mothers and teen fathers and the screenplay was written and rewritten over the course of a year and a half before being shot in only 17 days. The film received funding via grants from National Endowments for the Arts, American Film Institute, New York State Council on the Arts, Brooklyn Arts Council and was distributed by Miramax on 200 screens in the U.S. and 20 other countries worldwide.

In 2022, Harris stated that she had completed a screenplay for a sequel to the film.

== Filmography ==
- Exceptional Women of Color Hair Salon, Writer, Director, Producer 1990 Commercial
- The First Novel, Writer, Director, Producer 1991 Short
- Lorraine Klassen Tribute South African Music & Miriam Makeba: Live at SOB's, Director 1991 Music Video
- Just Another Girl on the I.R.T, Writer, Director, Producer 1992 Miramax Films
- Bessie Coleman: A Dream to Fly, Writer Director, Producer 1994 Short Film
- Never Forget 1994 Documentary Short
- Short-takes on the Independent feature Market, Segment Director 1997
- Elect Renee Collymore, Director, Producer 2014 Weisode Short
- Trailblazing Women Series, Herself, 2015

== 2015 New York Film Festival ==
In October 2015, during the audience Q&A portion of a conversation with film director Michael Moore at the New York Film Festival, Harris asked what minorities can do to break through in Hollywood. Moore responded that the low number of female directors is "a form of apartheid." Moore said "Women [and] especially men need to say this, and say it over and over and then do something about it. My guild, the Writers Guild [of America], Directors Guild [of America], we have to fix this. This is absolutely wrong".

== Awards ==
- Special Jury Prize Sundance Film Festival 1993
- Gotham Award Winner Open Palm 1993
- Official Selection Tokyo Film Festival 1993
- Official Selection Deauville Film Festival 1993
- Official Selection Toronto Film Festival 1993
- American Film Institute Filmmaker's Award
- Official Selection Philadelphia Film Festival 1996 - Never Forget Documentary Short
- Showtime Award for Excellence Bessie Coleman a Dream to Fly 1994 Showtime Broadcast
- Citation President of Brooklyn City of New York for Leslie Harris’ Contributions to the Arts and Film

== Grants and fellowships ==
- National Endowment for the Arts Grant
- New York State Council for the Arts (production and post-production)
- Association of Advertising Agencies Fellowship Award
- New York Foundation for the Arts Fellowship
- Jerome Foundation
- Association for Film and Video Grant
- Brooklyn Arts Council Filmmaker Grant
- Art Matters Fellowship
