= Pamela Ferrell =

American natural hair care businesswoman

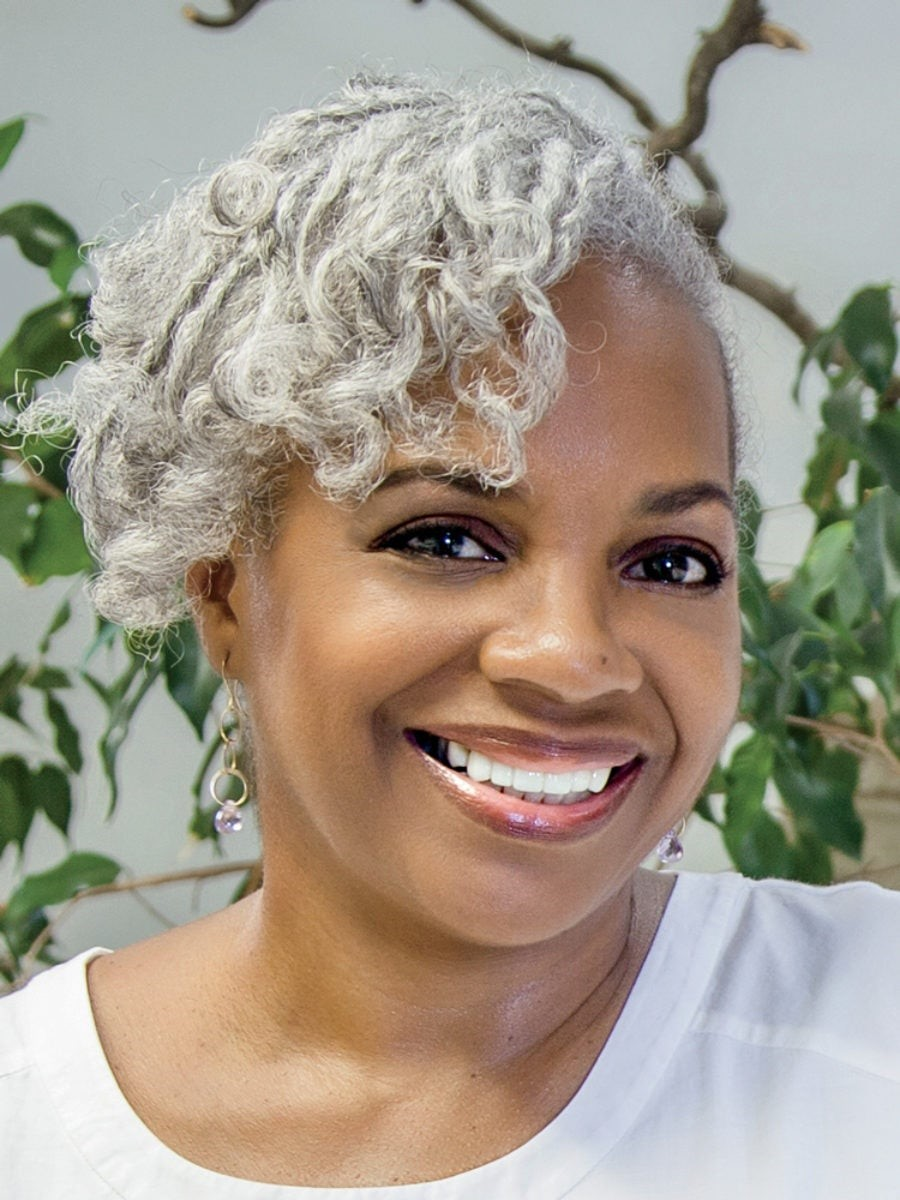
- Ferrell in 2019
- Born: Pamela L. Ferrell, 1959
- Education: Robert Lewis Cosmetology School, 1983
- Occupations: Entrepreneur, activist for natural hair
- Known for: Pioneer, activist in Natural Hair Care Movement
- Spouse: Taalib-Din Uqdah
- Website: www.cornrowsandco.com

Pamela L. Ferrell is an American entrepreneur, pioneer and advocate in the natural haircare field. She is best known for the pivotal role she played in assisting the United States (U.S.) Army and Navy with their review of hairstyle policies and regulations. She is the first known and documented African-American to help shape hair policies within the United States Armed Forces.

Ferrell has been an advocate in the natural haircare field since the early 1980s. Over the course of 40 years, she has been an active voice for natural hair care causes and a key contributor in efforts to get states to change outdated laws that impose unfair policies and fines on hair braiding salons.

== Early life ==
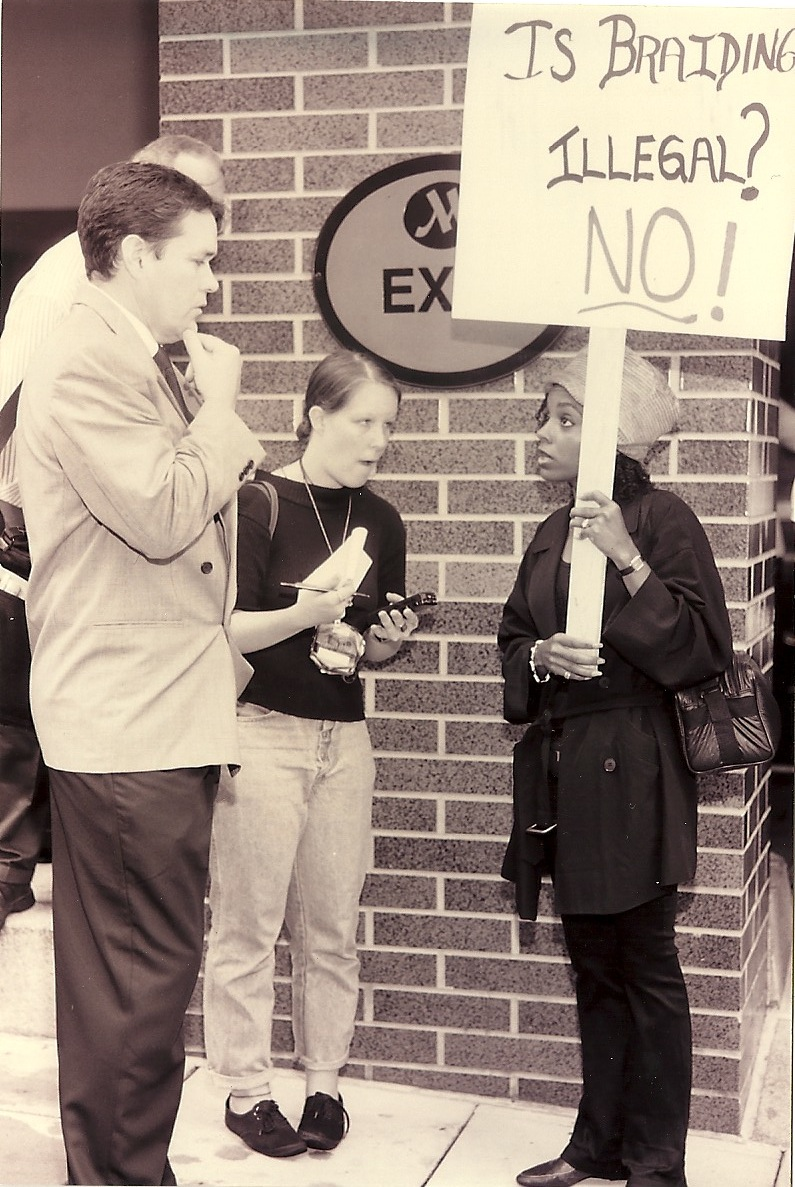
Ferrell speaks with reporters as she participated in the Marriott Hotel protest in 1996.

Ferrell grew up in Providence, Rhode Island. She is the middle child of 3 siblings and the daughter of Herbert Ferrell and Vioris Maynard. Ferrell stated in an exclusive interview with the Washington Post newspaper on September 17, 2020, that she left Rhode Island because of the police brutality she experienced at the age of 15. Days after graduating from Classical High School in 1977, Ferrell moved to Washington, DC, where she stayed with her uncle and attended the University of the District of Columbia to study Fashion and Business Marketing.

Ferrell met her husband, Uqdah in 1979 and they married in 1983. Shortly after this time, they opened a hair braiding business together. Ferrell is currently the owner of Cornrows and Company, with her husband, Taalib-Din Uqdah, located in Washington, DC. The company was established in 1980, with Ferrell and Uqdah signing a contract and putting a payment of $500 down, with a 4-year lease. A few years later the salon's popularity grew within the neighborhood and was accumulating close to $1.3 million a year. Uqdah, stated to a reporter in 1987, that their business was not driven by a desire to just make money but by the spirit of entrepreneurship and culture the company brought to the neighborhood.

The company's problems begun when the DC government started fining the company for operating without a cosmetology salon license. Soon after this, women responded to a “Wanted Poster” from Cornrows and Company stating they will pay the legal fees for women who were fired or were threaten with job lost because of their braided hairstyle.

The first person to respond to this poster was a woman by the name of Cheryl Tatum. Tatum worked for the Crystal City Hyatt Hotel located in Crystal City, Virginia. On her second confrontation with the hotel, Tatum refused to take out her braids and Cornrows & Co. paid the attorney fees to file for a discrimination lawsuit. As the issues surrounding this event grew, it caught the attention of Reverend Jesse Jackson during his run for the President of the United States in 1984. Jackson stated that he would pull out from using the Hyatt if the issue was not resolved. Sydney Boone, another woman suing the Hyatt Hotel (Washington, DC), met with a coalition of blacks to boycott the Hyatt the morning Jesse Jackson, his lawyers and Hyatt Hotel officials completed their meeting. As Jesse Jackson was walking outside of the hotel, Boone and the coalition started protesting. Other companies that did not allow braids during this time, such as American Airlines and the Marriot Hotel were also met with protests and lawsuits. Uqdah, the co-owner of Cornrows and Company stated that braids and different braid styles are engraved in the history and heritage of African-American culture. Ferrell's company supported customers by paying for attorney fees and organizing the protests that took place.

== Education ==
In 1979 Ferrell left the University of the District of Columbia to open a braiding business. In 1983, she attended the Robert Lewis Cosmetology School in Silver Spring, Maryland as part of an agreement made with the then, DC Mayor, Marion Barry, in order for the hair braiders in her salon to become exempt from attending a cosmetology school for hair braiding.

== Career ==
On March 16, 1978, Ferrell was fired from her place of employment due to her braided hairstyle. On a podcast that aired July 17, 2017, under TEDTalks, Ferrell describes how she felt about being fired and how this motivated her to become an advocate for women who wore braids and natural hair in the workplace.

For the last 40 years, Ferrell has been an entrepreneur, advocate for natural hair care, and an expert witness for hair braiding in legal cases. She developed the Circle Hair System which defined the different textures of hair. This system was used in the 2014 presentation to the U.S. Army and is now part of the Cornrows & Company collection in the National Museum of African-American History and Culture (NMAAHC). Ferrell stated she created the system as a method to explain the different textures in human hair.

=== Circle Hair Type System ===
The pictures below are the hair displays created by Ferrell in which she used in her 2014 presentation to the U.S. Army. The display is now part of the Cornrows & Company collection in the U.S. National Museum of African-American History and Culture (NMAAHC).

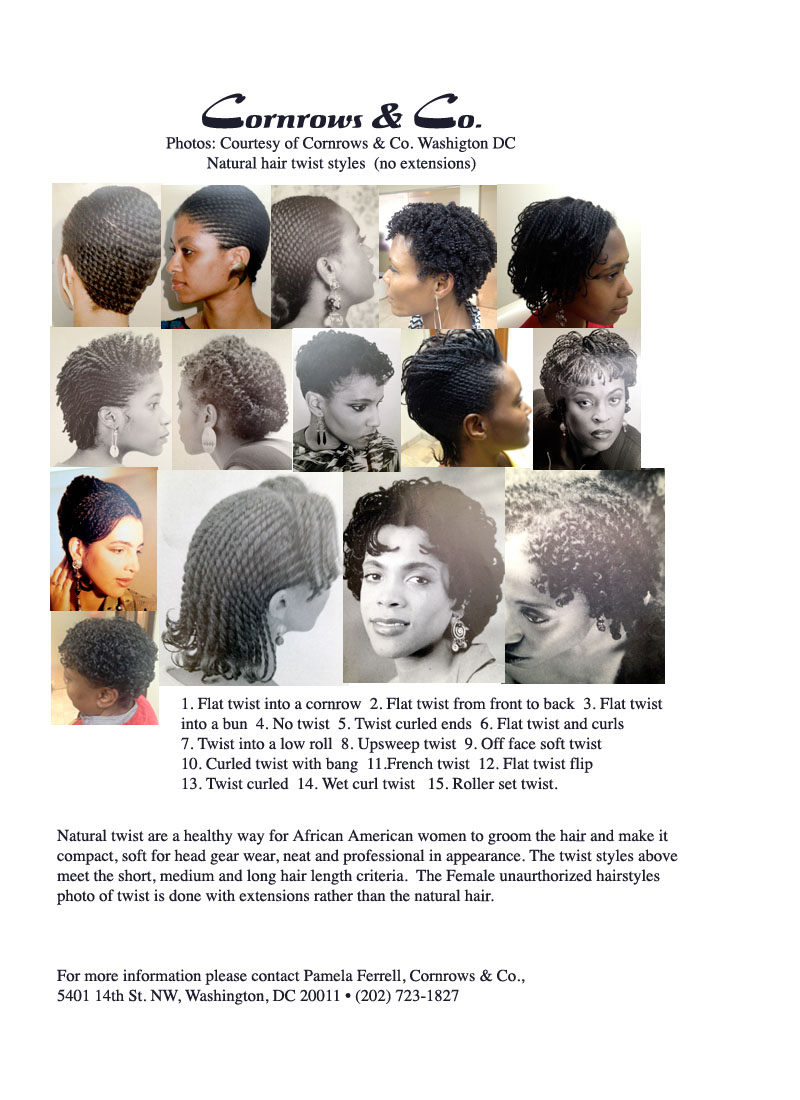

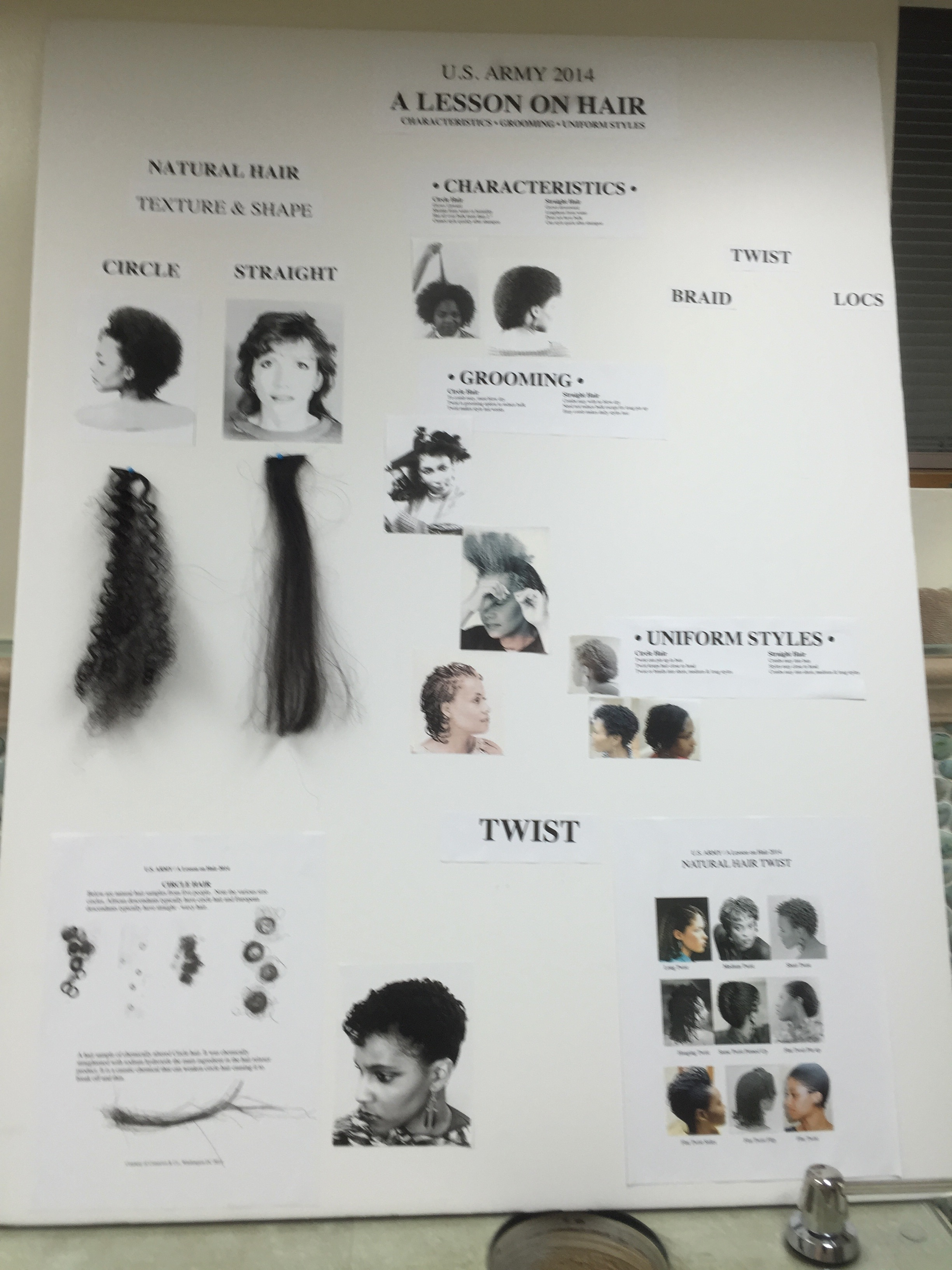

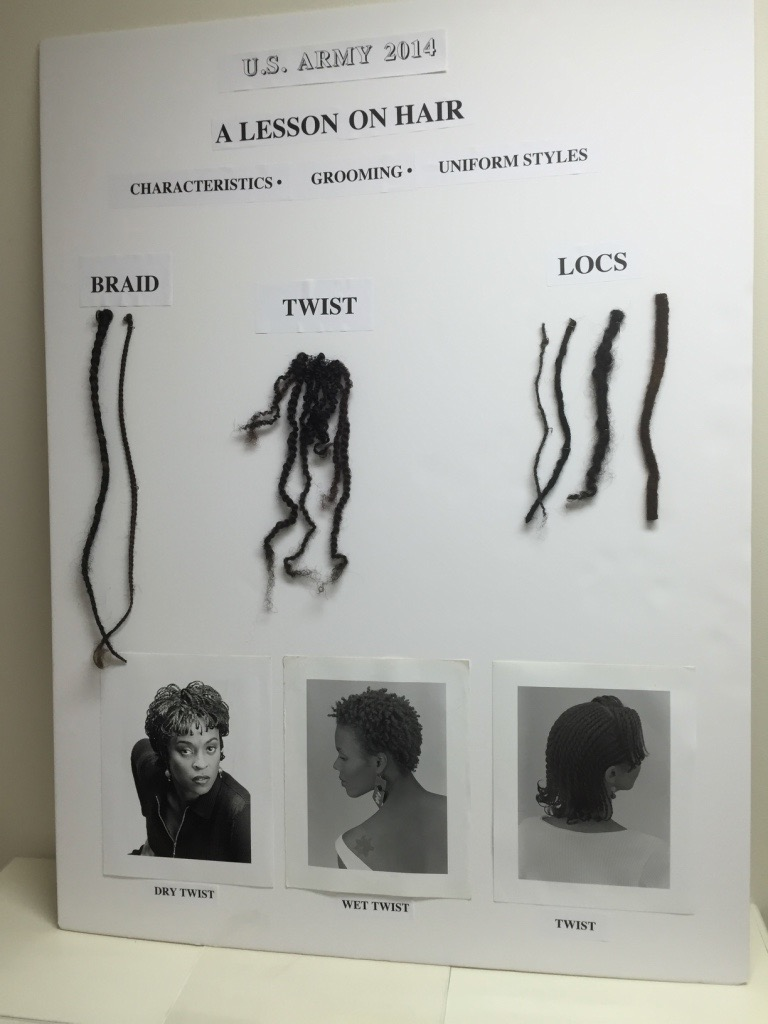

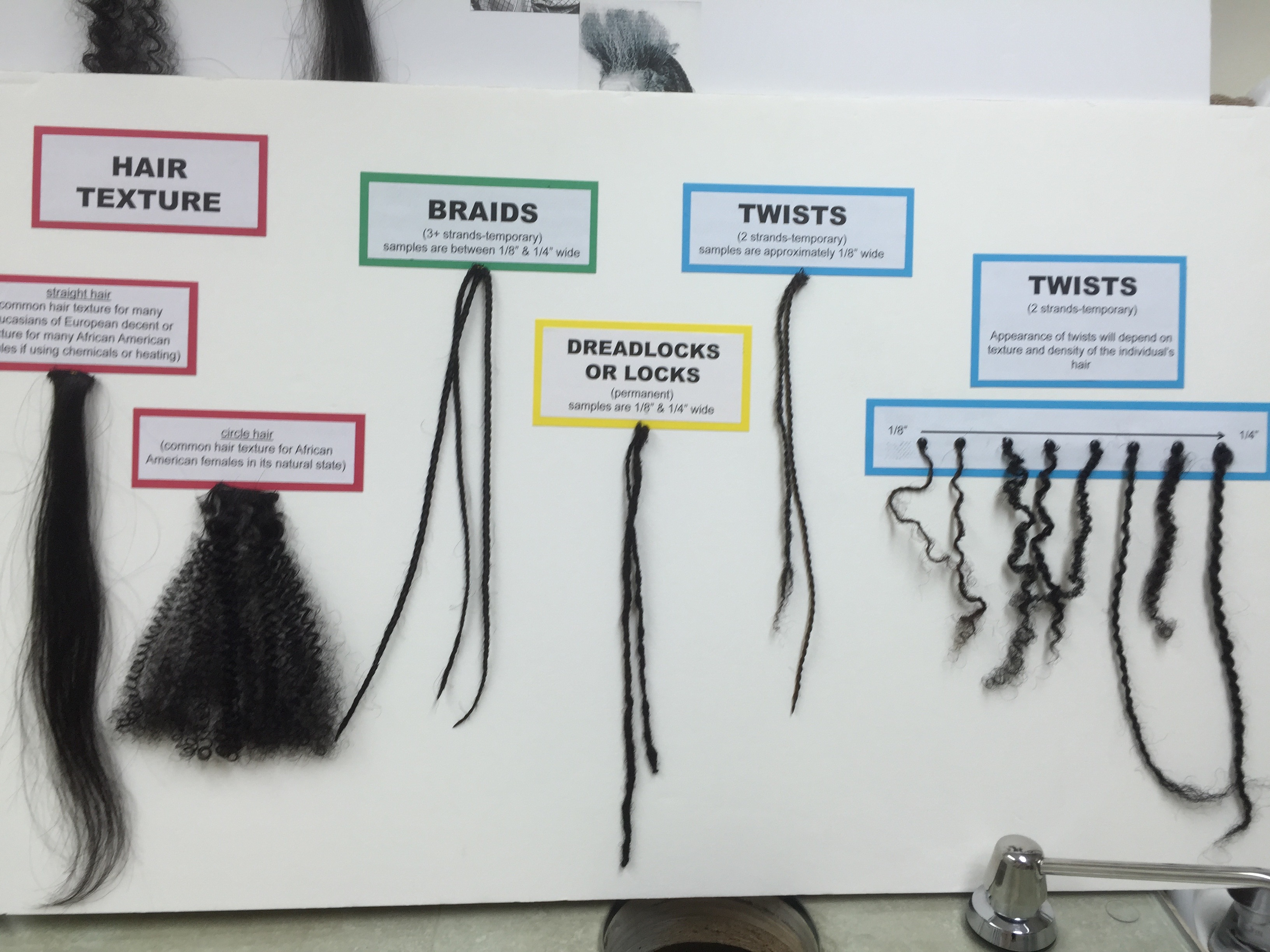

== Activism and Pioneer ==
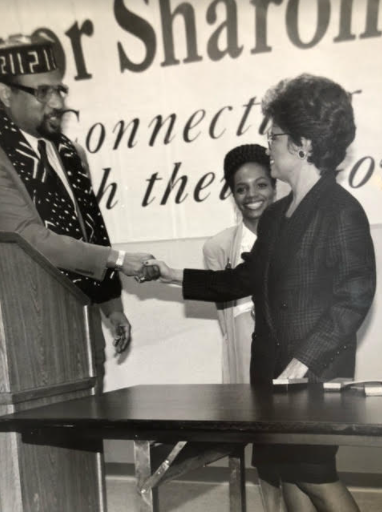
DC Mayor Sharon Pratt Kelly signed revised DC Barber Bill January 6, 1993. Pamela Ferrell in middle, and husband Uqdah, left, played instrumental roles in getting the Bill revised.

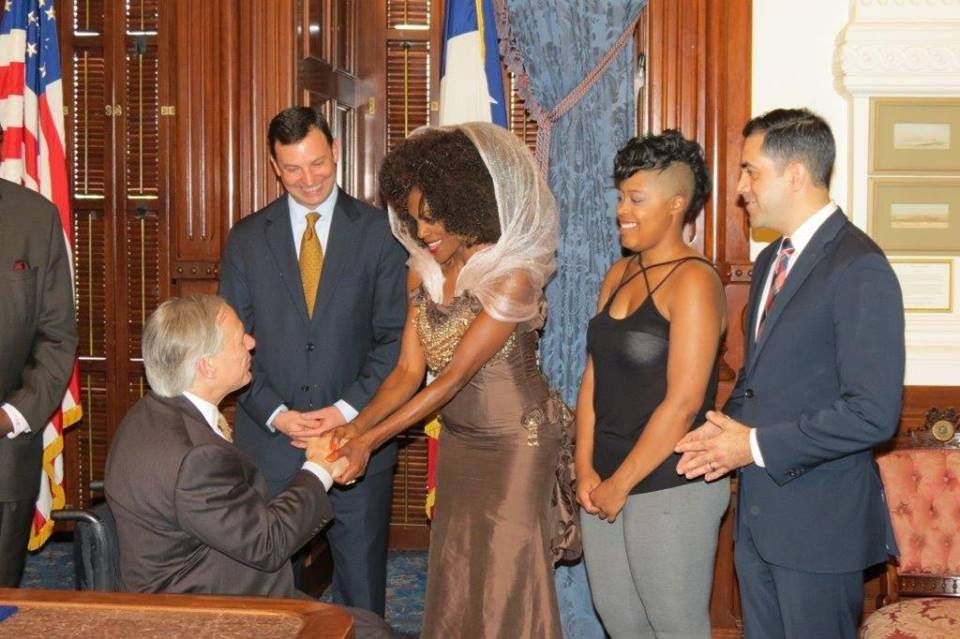
Brantley wins her case against the State of Texas with the assistance of advocate Pamela Ferrell. (photo by the State of Texas)

=== 1991 ===
In 1991, Ferrell and her husband were entangled in a legal battle with the District of Columbia's Department of Consumer and Regulatory Affairs. DC fined the business for operating without a cosmetology license for braiding hair, despite the fact the cosmetology curricula did not include instructions on natural hair braiding. Ferrell and her husband eventually sued the DC government. As a result of this case, in 1992 the DC government exempted hair braiding from the 1938 Jim Crow-era cosmetology regulation. The DC Department of Consumer and Regulatory Affairs amended wording in its regulation and created a separate license for braiders. This led to Ferrell being appointed to the Washington DC Barber and Cosmetology board as the Specialty Braider. Ferrell stated that this case was the catalyst that gave her a voice to start advocating on unreasonable state licensing requirements for natural hair braiders.

=== 1993 ===
In 1993, Ferrell served as an expert representative to assist the United States Navy, Uniform Board with its decisions in hair policies concerning different textured hair. In 1996 the Navy changed its hair regulations to include the wearing of braids.

=== 1996 ===
Ferrell and her husband were instrumental in getting the State of Maryland to exempt hair braiders from the cosmetology regulation.

=== 1997 ===
Ferrell served as the expert witness in order to assist Isis Brantley in her fight with the State of Texas concerning braiding licenses. Ferrell stated that the victory was not about hair braiding but more about protecting the 14th Amendment right to economic liberty.

=== 2014 ===
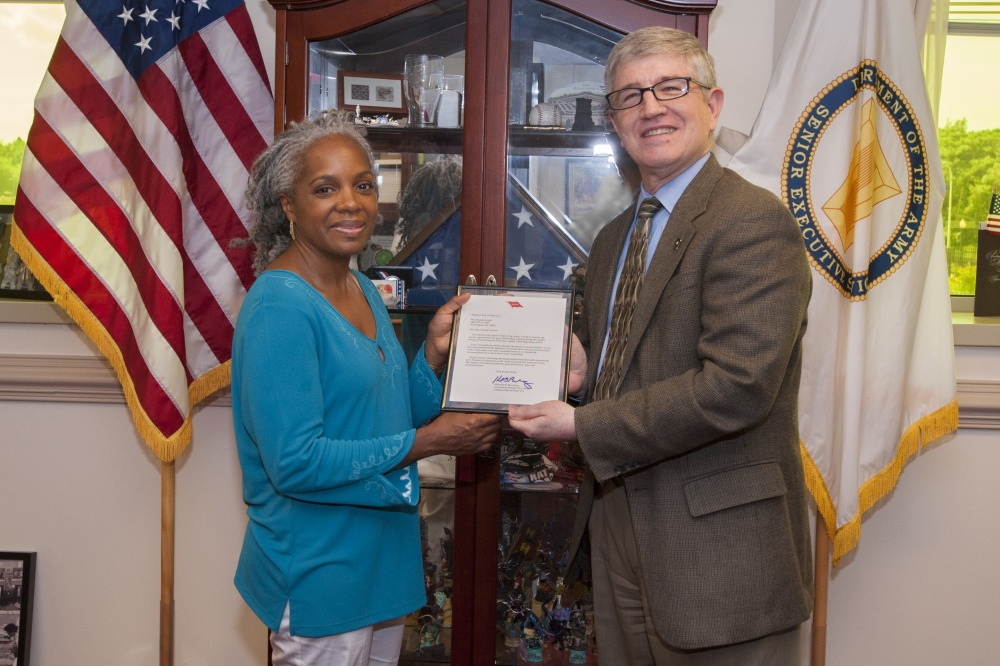
In 2014, Roy Wallace, assistant deputy chief of staff G-1, thanks and recognizes Pamela Ferrell for her work assisting the Army's review of hairstyle policies. (photo by U.S. Army)

In 2014, Ferrell played a key role in providing information and samples to the U.S. Army on different hair types and the negative results that can come from policies restricting natural hairstyles made by authorities with no actual knowledge or familiarity with hair. In the picture to the right, Roy Wallace, assistant deputy chief of staff G-1, gives thanks to Pamela Ferrell for assisting in the Army's review of hairstyle policies.

=== 2019 ===
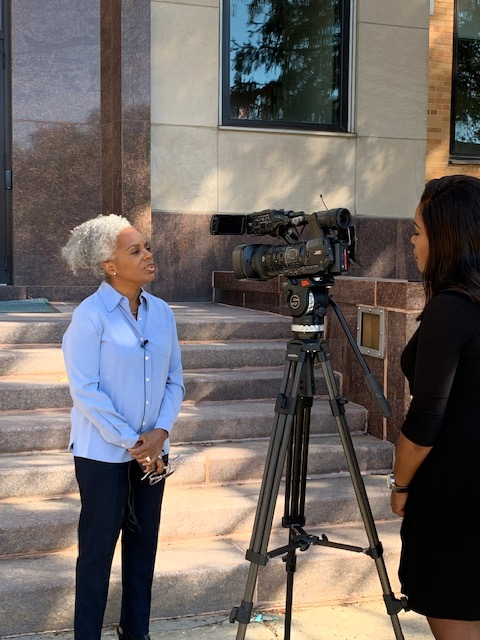
Ferrell speaks with reporters after giving testimony during the Crown Act amendment in Rockville, Maryland, 2019.

The CROWN Act - - On September 24, 2019, Councilmember, Will Jawando, and Council President, Nancy Navarro introduced to Montgomery County Councilmembers in Rockville, Maryland, the Amendment to Bill 30–19. Ferrell was invited to give testimony on the Bill by a customer who was a Montgomery County resident. Many other individuals, along with the Alpha Kappa Alpha sorority, Theta Omega Omega chapter, presented testimonies of discrimination in the workplace and school events due to their natural hairstyles. Ferrell supported the Bill however with amended recommended changes.

Prior to the hearing on October 15, Ferrell gave testimony and expert witness accounts to why Bill 30-19 should be modified to include language “Protected” rather than “Protective” hairstyles. Ferrell recommended the language be consistent with the Protected class under the employment discrimination law. In Ferrell's testimony, she defined protected hairstyles as an ambiguous term. The hearing for the recommended changes took place on October 19, 2019. Despite opposition on part of some council members, the CROWN Act, Bill 30–19, was revised on October 28, 2019, to include language that prohibited discrimination based on certain natural hairstyles. The updated Bill was signed November 7, 2019, in the Maryland Senate and was effective on February 6, 2020.

=== Other states supported ===
Ferrell served as an expert witness on the following cases and states:

| CASE/STATE | YEAR | SOURCE |
| JoAnne Cornwell (Sisterlocks), et al. vs. California | 1997 | http://braidingfreedom.com/braiding-initiative/supporters/dr-joanne-cornwell/, https://law.justia.com/cases/federal/district-courts/FSupp/962/1260/2311323/ |
| Melony Armstrong, Margaret Burden & Christina Griffin vs Mississippi | 2005 | https://ij.org/case/armstrong-v-lunsford/ |
| Jestina Clayton vs. Utah | 2012 | https://www.ksl.com/article/21638994/court-sides-with-woman-in-hair-braiding-case |
| Ndloba Niang and Tameka Stigers vs. Missouri | 2015 | https://court.rchp.com/african-hair-braiders-win-u-s-supreme-court-voids-ruling/ |

Within these states, the cosmetology regulation was changed to exempt hair braiders from the cosmetology act.

== Media ==
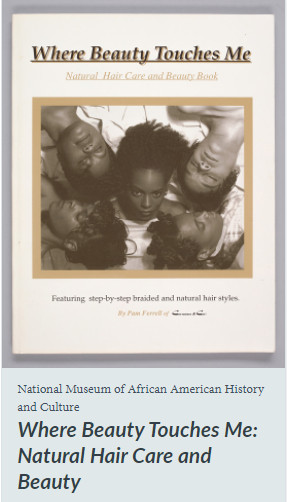
Smithsonian Museum Display Release: Book by Pamela Ferrell on display at the Smithsonian National Museum of African American History and Culture in Washington, DC (photo by Andre Richardson)

=== Newspapers, magazine articles ===
Ferrell's company began advocating for woman's rights to wear braided hairstyles in the early 1980s. As more women embraced African-inspired hairstyles, hair braiders opened businesses around the country to offer this service. State regulatory agencies threaten these businesses with closure because they did not have a barber or cosmetology license. Ferrell's company became the first client of the Institute for Justice National Law Firm that set out to change state laws to protect hair braiders' 14th amendment rights to earn an honest living without overburdensome government regulations. From the 1990s and forward, Ferrell continues to advocate that Hair Braiding businesses are exempt from state barber and cosmetology Acts.

In the articles below, Ferrell voiced her concerns about the politics and versatility of black hair. Within some articles, she was asked to discuss current issues that involved natural hair care and styles:

- 1991 - Within Washington's business journal, Ferrell and her husband discuss how they got started with their business and the issues they faced along the way that helped them grow.
- 1992 - The economic rights writer of The Wall Street Journal, Gordon Crovitz, discusses the case of Uqdah and Ferrell (owners of Cornrows & Co), in which the DC Board of Cosmetology tries to shut down a black-owned business. Crovitz states that the Cornrows & Co. business is an important part of the community, bringing in over $500,000 per year, providing jobs, important information, and training to the community. Corvitz also states that he believes that Uqdah and his wife could become the next Rosa Parks in the hair care industry by challenging discriminatory regulation practices across the U.S.
- 1992 - In this article, Ferrell and TV film director, writer, and producer, Julie Dash both agreed that people should see this film (Daughters of the Dust) just because of the aesthetically pleasing beautiful hair displayed. Ferrell commented that people of color, over the years have been made to feel as if they were not accepted into society if their hair was not straight. She states that the film displays hair of all different textures which are all visually beautiful.
- 1993 - After the win against DC cosmetology practices and politicians, Uqdah, Ferrell, and braiders sat down to discuss what the new law meant to them. The new law separates African-style braiding from that of cosmetology. The braiders emphasized the new law is important to them because they no longer are forced to take expensive and time-consuming classes that do not address nature hairstyles and care. The braiders mentioned that the victory meant a broader acceptance of creative African-influenced hairstyles in many different working sectors for many women.
- 1999 - Within an article written within Mothering Magazine in the November–December 1991 edition, Ferrell discusses the damaging practices that women of color went through in order to have acceptable hairstyles. She also shared techniques for caring for chemical-free natural hairstyles.
- 2000 - Within an article written by the Christian Science Publishing Society, Ferrell and other professionals speak on the way in which African-American hairstyles progressed over the years and the significance they played during different eras in American history. Ferrell spoke on how the term “happy nappy” transformed into a compliment after many African-Americans decided to go natural.
- 2014 - In the People section of USA Today (July 2014), Ferrell and various advocates shared their views on celebrity kids, (Beyoncé, Cruise, Pitt etc.) and some of the bullying techniques used to target these children. Ferrell commented on an incident in which Beyoncé's daughter, Blue Ivey, was criticized because of her hair texture.
- 2018 - In an article within the Washington City Paper, dated November 18, 2018, Ferrell is amongst others that were named as "Washingtonians that give DC its distinct character." Within the article, Ferrell is referred to as the Hair Fixer. The article states that Ferrell, having spent 4 decades in the natural hair care industry, braiding, and understanding different types of hair, has become a force in policymaking.
- 2019 - In October 2019, Ferrell and other natural hair advocates are featured in a special edition of Essence Magazine. In the article, the advocates shared their stories of fighting State laws that hindered the opening of natural hair care businesses. Ferrell shared her story of how she was fired from a job for wearing her natural hair. This catapulted her to conduct her own research into laws that discriminate against people for wearing natural hair and hairstyles in the workplace.

=== Films supported ===
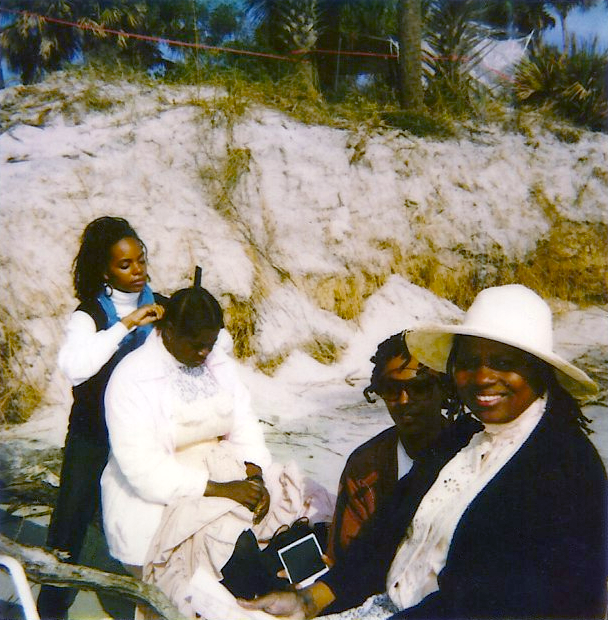
Hairstylist Pamela Ferrell (left) on set with Daughters of the Dust actors.

In the early 1990s, Ferrell was solicited by entertaining artist Diana Ross and TV filmmaker, Julie Dash for support in several television and film productions. In both productions, Ferrell was the key make-up artist and hair designer. She worked closely with both Ross and Dash to provide the creative details needed for the vision and style of each scene. Ferrell also worked with the actors on set, detailing the make-up for each scene.

- In 1991, Ferrell was the key hair designer in the making of the American Playhouse Independent film Daughters of the Dust.
- In 1993, Ferrell was the key hair designer to entertainer Diana Ross during the television movie Out of Darkness. The movie was released in 1994.

== Publications ==
- ArtStyles. United States: Publications Cornrows & Company (1986).
- Thunderhead Haircare Video for Moms and Dads. United States: Cornrows & Company Publications (1991).
- Where Beauty Touches Me. United States: Cornrows & Company Publications (1993).
- Let's Talk Hair: Every Black Woman's Personal Consultation for Healthy Growing Hair. United States: Cornrows & Company Publications (1996).
- Kids Talk Hair: An Instruction Book for Grown-Ups & Kids. United States: Cornrows & Company Publications (1999).
