= Megalyn Echikunwoke =

American actress (born 1983)

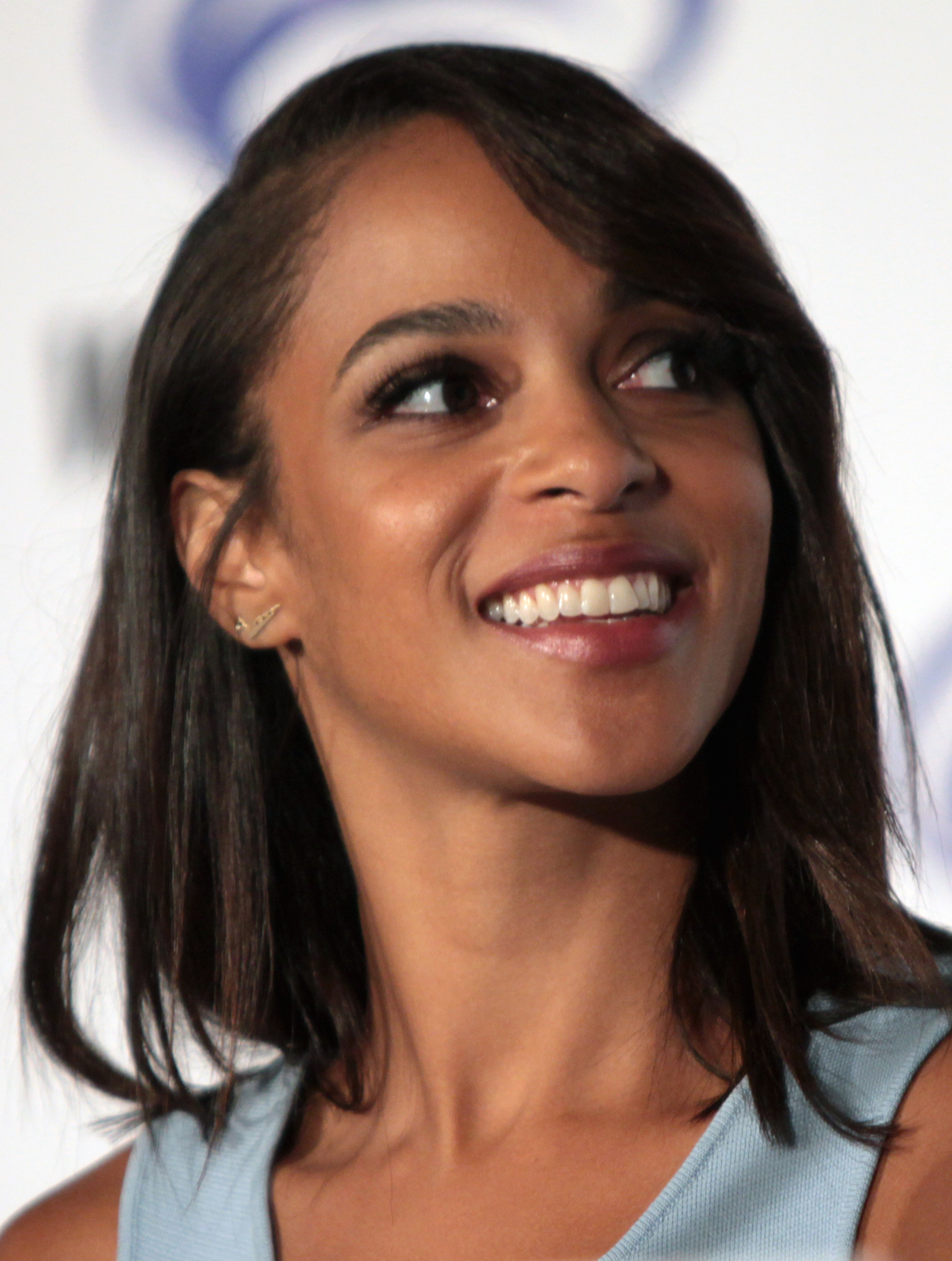
- Echikunwoke in 2016
- Born: Ebubennem Megalyn Ann Echikunwoke; May 28, 1983 (age 43); Spokane, Washington, U.S.
- Other name: Megalyn E.K.
- Occupation: Actress
- Years active: 1998–present

Ebubennem Megalyn Ann Echikunwoke // (/ˈmɛɡəlɪn ɛˌtʃɪkʊnˈwoʊkeɪ/ MEG-ə-lin etch-IK-uun-WOH-kay; born May 28, 1983), also known as Megalyn E.K., is an American actress, known primarily for her roles in television and film.

Born in Spokane, Washington, she was discovered while performing in a theatrical production for an arts academy, and began working professionally at age 15, appearing in an episode of The Steve Harvey Show. Between 2001 and 2002, she starred as Nicole Palmer, daughter of David Palmer, on the Fox series 24, followed by guest roles on ER and Buffy the Vampire Slayer. Between 2004 and 2005, she portrayed Angie Barnett, the half-sister of Steven Hyde, on the sitcom That '70s Show. In 2006, she starred as a lead in the series The 4400 which ran until 2007, followed by recurring roles on 90210 and House of Lies.

Her film roles in the early 2010s include Whit Stillman's Damsels in Distress (2011), and the action sequel A Good Day to Die Hard (2013). In 2016, she portrayed Mari McCabe / Vixen in the Arrowverse. The following year, she had a supporting role in CHiPs (2017), followed by the independent comedy An Actor Prepares (2018). Next, she co-starred in the comedy Night School (2018). In late 2018, she made her New York stage debut in an off-Broadway production of Apologia.

== Early life ==
Ebubennem Megalyn Ann Echikunwoke was born in Spokane, Washington to Mark Onigwe Versato Echikunwoke, a black Igbo Nigerian father, and Anita Laurie, a white American mother. Her father, an immigrant to the United States, was a survivor of the Nigerian Civil War, during which he suffered gunshot wounds that resulted in him contracting hepatitis B.

When Echikunwoke was four years old, her father, then attending law school in Spokane, died of liver cancer, stemming from his war-related medical problems. Her mother moved the family to the Navajo Nation, where she raised Echikunwoke and her siblings in the unincorporated community of Chinle, Arizona. At age 14, Echikunwoke was discovered while performing in a theater production at an arts academy summer camp.

== Career ==
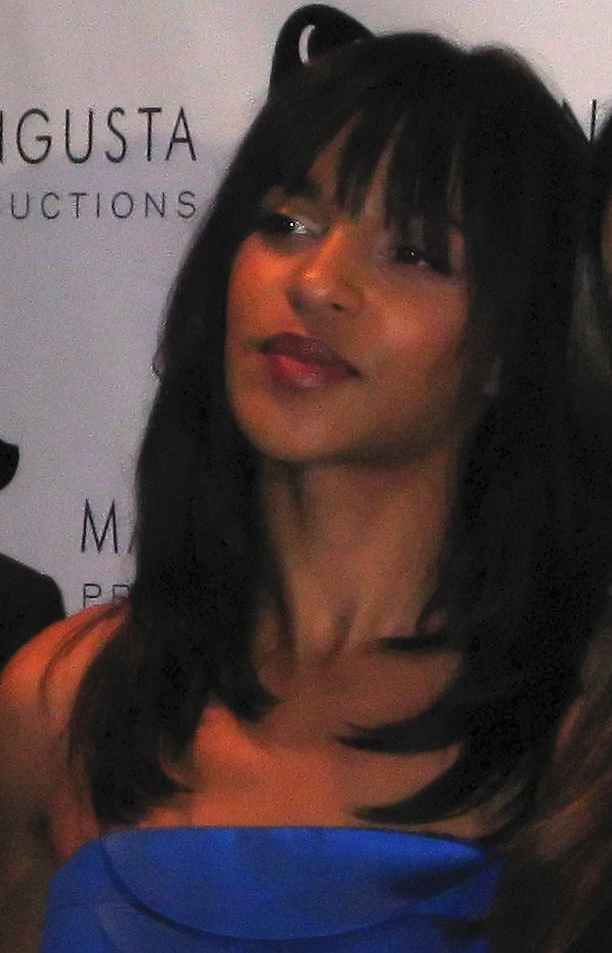
Echikunwoke in 2009

Echikunwoke's first featured role was a guest appearance on The Steve Harvey Show in 1998. The following year, she had her first film role in Julie Dash's Funny Valentines. In 2001, she starred in a lead role on the MTV soap opera Spyder Games as Cherish Pardee, a coffee house singer, which ran through the year. She subsequently had a recurring role in the first season of 24 (2001–2002) as David Palmer's daughter Nicole. Beginning in 2003, she appeared as Danika on the comedy series Like Family, and guest-starred on Buffy the Vampire Slayer in the episode "The Killer in Me" (2003). This was followed with a guest role on Veronica Mars (2004).

Between 2004 and 2005, she appeared on FOX's That '70s Show as Steven Hyde's half-sister, Angie Barnett. In 2006, she was cast as a series regular on the science fiction television series The 4400 as the adult version of the mysterious Isabelle Tyler. She left the show in 2007. From 2008 to 2009, she appeared on season 7 of CSI: Miami as new medical examiner Dr. Tara Price. She had a recurring role on TNT's Raising the Bar (2008–2009) as the love-interest of attorney Marcus McGrath, played by J. August Richards; also in 2008, she appeared as a singer in the Leonard Chess biopic Who Do You Love? In 2011, she played Holly for the fourth season of 90210, and subsequently appeared in the comedy film Damsels in Distress.

She played April on Showtime's House of Lies (2012) and Riley Parker, in the legal drama Made in Jersey (also 2012), on CBS. In 2014, she co-starred in the drama series Mind Games on ABC.

In 2016, Echikunwoke appeared on the CW's Arrow as DC Comics superhero Mari McCabe / Vixen for an episode, and voiced the character in the CW Seed animated series Vixen. Due to prior commitments, she was unavailable to play the character in Legends of Tomorrow, resulting in the introduction of a new Vixen (played by Maisie Richardson-Sellers), the time-displaced grandmother of Echikunwoke's character. Echikunwoke had a supporting role in Dax Shepard's CHiPs (2017), followed by the comedy An Actor Prepares (2018). That year, she had a supporting role in the comedy Night School, which grossed over $100 million.

In 2018, Echikunwoke played Claire in the off-Broadway production of Apologia for the Roundabout Theatre Company, which ran from October 16 through December 16 of that year. In 2019, she had a supporting role in Late Night. She subsequently had a lead role on Almost Family, a FOX drama series chronicling three women who learn that they are siblings after a prominent fertility doctor reveals he has used his own sperm to father over 100 children with his patients. It was canceled after one season.

== Personal life ==
In 2007, Echikunwoke, along with Justin Long, Olivia Wilde, and Kal Penn, successfully campaigned for 2008 Democratic presidential nominee Barack Obama. The campaign included a winter tour of college campuses and bars in Iowa, with the added goal of registering new and young college-aged voters, known as the “All-Actor All-Iowa All-Star Voter Education Tour”.

Echikunwoke's cousin is athlete Annette Echikunwoke.

== Filmography ==
=== Film ===
Year	Title	Role	Notes	Ref.
1999	Funny Valentines	Lauren	Drama	
2004	Great Lengths	Elena	Short film	
2006	Camjackers	Sista Strada Cast		
2008	Fix	Carmen	Drama	
2008	Who Do You Love?	Ivy Mills		
2011	Damsels in Distress	Rose	Comedy / Drama / Romance	
2011	Free Hugs	Megan	Short film	
2013	A Good Day to Die Hard	Pretty Reporter		
2014	Electric Slide	Jean	Action / Crime / Thriller	
2014	Night Swim	Eve	Short film	
2015	The Meddler	Elise		
2017	CHiPs	Patricia Eerly		
2018	Step Sisters	Jamilah	Comedy	
2018	An Actor Prepares	Clementine		
2018	Night School	Lisa King	Comedy	
2019	Late Night	Robin		
2022	Emily the Criminal	Liz	Crime / Drama / Thriller	
2022	The Drop	Birth Doula	Comedy	
2026	In Memoriam	Rachel	Comedy / Drama	

=== Television ===
Year	Title	Role	Notes	Ref.
1998	Creature	Elizabeth Gibson	Miniseries	
1998	The Steve Harvey Show	Allison Hightower	Episode: "Uncle Steve"	
2000	Malibu, CA	Randy	Episode: "Three Dudes and a Baby"	
2001	Spyder Games	Cherish Pardee	65 episodes	
2001–2002	24	Nicole Palmer	6 episodes	
2002	Sheena	Janel	Episode: "Coming to Africa"	
2002	ER	Terry Welch	Episode: "Bygones"	
2002	For the People	Claudia Gibson	2 episodes	
2002	What I Like About You	Karen	Episode: "The Parrot Trap"	
2002	B.S.	Shannon Cross	Television film	
2003	Buffy the Vampire Slayer	Vaughne	Episode: "The Killer in Me"	
2003–2004	Like Family	Danika Ward	22 episodes	
2004	Veronica Mars	Rain	Episode: "Drinking the Kool-Aid"	
2004–2005	That '70s Show	Angie Barnett	8 episodes	
2005	Hitched	Christina	Television film	
2006	Supernatural	Cassie Robinson	Episode: "Route 666"	
2006–2007	The 4400	Isabelle Tyler	Main role	
2008	The Game	Cheyenne	Episode: "Take These Vows and Shove 'Em!"	
2008–2009	CSI: Miami	Tara Price	Main role	
2009	Raising the Bar	Amelia Mkali	3 episodes	
2009	Law & Order: Special Victims Unit	Nicole Gleason	Episode: "Anchor"	
2011–2012	90210	Holly Strickler	Recurring role	
2012	House of Lies	April	Recurring role	
2012	Beautiful People	Monica	Television film	
2012	Made in Jersey	Riley Parker	Main role	
2014	American Dad!	Angie	Voice, episode: "Introducing the Naughty Stewardess"	
2014	Mind Games	Megan Shane	Main role	
2015	The Following	Penny	4 episodes	
2016	Arrow	Mari McCabe / Vixen	Episode: "Taken"	
2016	Damien	Simone Baptiste	Main role	
2017	Ghosted	Natalie	Episode: "Whispers"	
2017	White Famous	Sadie	4 episodes	
2019	The Masked Singer	Herself	Episode: "Return of the Masks: Group C"	
2019–2020	Almost Family	Edie Palmer	Main role	
2021	Into the Dark	Esme Rawls	Episode: "Blood Moon"	
2025	Alert: Missing Persons Unit	Lt. Gabrielle Bennett	4 Episodes	

=== Web ===
Year	Title	Role	Notes	Ref.
2015–2016	Vixen	Mari McCabe / Vixen	Voice, main role	
2018	Freedom Fighters: The Ray	Mari McCabe / Vixen	Voice	
2023	Queenterrogated	Detective	YouTube	

=== Video games ===
Year	Title	Role	Notes	Ref.
2017	Injustice 2	Mari McCabe / Vixen	Voice	
2018	Lego DC Super-Villains	Mari McCabe / Vixen	Voice	
2019	Mortal Kombat 11	Jacqui Briggs	Voice	
2019	Heroes of the Storm	Qhira	Voice	

== Stage credits ==
Year	Title	Role	Notes	Ref.
2018	Apologia	Claire	Roundabout Theatre Company	
