= Four Women =

Four Women may refer to:

- Four Women (comics), an American comic series by Sam Keith
- "Four Women" (song), a 1966 jazz song by musician Nina Simone
- Four Women (1947 film), a Spanish drama film
- Four Women (1975 film), a film by Julie Dash
- Naalu Pennungal, or Four Women, a 2007 Indian film by Adoor Gopalakrishnan
- "Four Women" (Falcon Crest), a 1990 television episode
