= Lonette McKee =

American actress (born 1954)

- Born: Lonette Rita McKee; July 22, 1954 (age 72); Detroit, Michigan, U.S.
- Education: The New School
- Occupations: Actress; singer
- Years active: 1968–present
- Spouse: Leo Compton (m. 1983; div. 1990)
- Family: Kathy McKee (sister)
- Website: lonettemckee.com

Lonette Rita McKee (born July 22, 1954) is an American actress and singer. She made her big screen debut starring as Sister Williams in the original 1976 musical-drama film Sparkle. McKee later appeared in films Which Way Is Up? (1977), The Cotton Club (1984), Brewster's Millions (1985), Round Midnight (1986), Gardens of Stone (1987), Jungle Fever (1991), Malcolm X (1992), Men of Honor (2000), Honey (2003) and ATL (2006).

McKee became the first African American to play the coveted role of Julie and received critical acclaim for her performance in Broadway musical Show Boat in 1983, for which she received a Tony Award nomination for Best Actress in a Musical. She also starred in The First and played Billie Holiday in Lady Day at Emerson's Bar and Grill. McKee also received three Drama Desk and three NAACP Image Awards nominations during her career.

== Early life and education ==
Born in Detroit, Michigan, McKee was the second of three daughters of Dorothy McKee, of Swedish descent, and Lonnie McKee, an African American bricklayer and auto manufacturer employee. Lonette's mother was Scandinavian American. McKee's older sister, Kathrine "Kathy" McKee, is also an actress and performer. McKee attended St Martin De Porres High School, but dropped out after her freshman year, moving to Los Angeles, California, to live with her older sister. As a young girl Lonette performed at record hops, dances, and small night clubs in her hometown of Detroit with help from her mother.

== Career ==
McKee's career began in the music business in Detroit as a child prodigy, where she started writing music and lyrics, singing, playing keyboards, and performing at the age of seven. In 1968, McKee, then aged 14, recorded her first record titled "Stop! (Don't Worry About It)". It became an instant regional pop/R&B hit. McKee wrote the title song for the film Quadroon, in which her sister Katherine McKee starred, when she was fifteen.

Several years later, McKee was launched to stardom with her critically acclaimed performance in the hit 1976 musical drama film Sparkle. McKee's career further took off throughout the mid-1970s to late 1980s, with her starring alongside comedy superstar Richard Pryor in the 1977 comedy film Which Way Is Up?, and in the 1985 comedy film Brewster's Millions. During this period, McKee played as an African American woman passing as white in both Julie Dash's 1982 short film, Illusions and in Francis Ford Coppola's 1984 musical crime drama The Cotton Club.

She has written and produced three solo LPs. Natural Love was produced for Spike Lee's Columbia 40 Acres and A Mule label in 1992. Ed Hogan, reviewing for AllMusic, wrote, "'Natural Love' shows that the singer/songwriter's muse knows no stylistic bounds. As with her earlier effort, McKee co-writes all of the songs while sharing production credits with Bryant McNeil, Gene Lake Jr., and labelmate Raymond Jones of State of Art." McKee scored the music for the well-received cable documentary on the Lower Manhattan African Burial Ground, as well as numerous infomercials. McKee has toured extensively throughout the world singing concert performances, including the JVC Jazz Festival at Carnegie Hall. McKee studied film directing at The New School in New York and apprenticed directing with the filmmaker Spike Lee. McKee also studied singing with Dini Clark and ballet with Sarah Tayir, both in Los Angeles. She also appeared on the CW sitcom The Game as Mrs. Pitts, the mother of Jason (played by Coby Bell), in 2007.

McKee won critical acclaim for her Broadway debut performance in the musical The First in 1981, co-starring in the role of Jackie Robinson's wife Rachel. She became the first African American to play the coveted role of Julie in the Houston Grand Opera's production of Show Boat in 1983 on Broadway, for which she received a Tony Award nomination for Best Actress in a Musical. McKee's tragic portrayal of jazz legend Billie Holiday in the one-woman drama with music, Lady Day at Emerson's Bar and Grill, won critical acclaim, standing ovations, and a 1987 Drama Desk Award nomination (Outstanding Actress in a Musical). She reprised the role of Julie on Broadway in the 1994 revival of Show Boat directed by Hal Prince. In 2012 she starred in New Federal Theatre’s production of Sowa’s Red Gravy.

In 2013, McKee expressed a desire to establish a performance arts center in the New York tri-state area. She performs her one-woman memoir with music on stages throughout the US. She produced her first feature film, Dream Street, which she wrote and directed.

== Personal life ==
McKee has been married once and has no children. She dated the actor and stand-up comedian Freddie Prinze for a time during 1976, while he was still married and after his wife had given birth to their son. McKee was married to Leo Compton, a youth counselor, from February 1983 to 1990. In the mid-1990s, she lived in an Upper East Side brownstone with her companion, the musician Bryant McNeil. They met while they were working together on McKee's Natural Love album.

McKee teaches a master acting workshop at Centenary College of New Jersey, where she is an adjunct professor in the Theater Arts department.

== Discography ==
- Lonette (Sussex, 1974)
- Words and Music (Warner Bros., 1978)
- Natural Love (40 Acres and a Mule/Columbia, 1992)

== Filmography ==
=== Film ===
Year	Title	Role	Notes
1976	Sparkle	Sister Williams	
1977	Which Way Is Up?	Vanetta	
1979	Cuba	Therese Mederos	
1982	Illusions	Mignon Dupree	Short film
1984	The Cotton Club	Lila Rose Oliver	
1985	Brewster's Millions	Angela Drake	
1986	'Round Midnight	Darcey Leigh	
1987	Gardens of Stone	Betty Rae Nelson	
1991	Jungle Fever	Drew Purify	Nominated — NAACP Image Award for Outstanding Actress in a Motion Picture
1992	Malcolm X	Louise Little	
1998	He Got Game	Martha Shuttlesworth	
1998	Blind Faith	Carol Williams	
2000	Men of Honor	Ella Brashear	
2000	Fast Food Fast Women	Sherry-Lynn	
2001	A Day in Black and White		
2001	Lift	Elanie Maxwell	Nominated — Black Reel Awards for Best Supporting Actress
2003	Honey	Connie Daniels	
2003	The Paper Mache Chase	Lisa	Short film
2004	She Hate Me	Lottie Armstrong	
2006	ATL	Priscilla Garnett	
2010	Dream Street		Director
2011	Honey 2	Connie Daniels	
2011	This Narrow Place	Mrs. Shaw	
2012	LUV	Grandma	
2015	Against the Jab	Dj Mike's mother	

=== Television ===
Year	Title	Role	Notes
1985	Spenser: For Hire	Hillary	Episode: Blood Money
1985	The Equalizer	Dr. Elly Walton	Episode: "Reign of Terror"
1986	Miami Vice	Alicia Mena	Episode: Stone's War
1989	Amen	Tanya DuBois	Episode: The Psychic (Part 1); The Psychic (Part 2)
1989	The Women of Brewster Place	Lorraine	TV mini-series
1990	Dangerous Passion	Meg Jordan	TV movie
1991	L.A. Law	ADA Kari Simms	Episode: There Goes the Judge
1993	Tribeca	Detective Simmons	Episode: The Loft
1993	Alex Haley's Queen	Alice	TV mini-series
1997	To Dance with Olivia	Olivia "Libby" Stewart	TV movie Nominated — NAACP Image Award for Outstanding Actress in a Television Movie, Mini-Series or Dramatic Special
1997–1999	As The World Turns	Sara Ruth Bennett	Nominated — NAACP Image Award for Outstanding Actress in a Daytime Drama Series (1999)
1999	Having Our Say: The Delany Sisters' First 100 Years	Mama Delany	TV movie
1999–2003	Third Watch	Maggie Davis	10 episodes
2001	For Love of Olivia	Olivia "Libby" Stewart	
2002	Law & Order: Special Victims Unit	Attorney Greer	Episode: Chameleon
2006	Half & Half	Tanya	Episode: The Big Thanks for Nothing Episode
2006	1-800-Missing	Miss Chambers	Episode: Exposure
2007–2014	The Game	Maria Pitts	3 episodes
