= Funny Valentines =

- Directed by: Julie Dash
- Screenplay by: Ron Stacker Thompson; Ashley Tyler; Amy Schor Ferris
- Based on: Funny Valentines by J. California Cooper
- Produced by: Scott White
- Starring: Alfre Woodard
- Cinematography: Karl Herrmann
- Edited by: Hibah Frisina
- Music by: Stanley Clarke
- Production companies: BET Movies; Starz! Pictures; Chelsey Avenue Productions
- Distributed by: Starz! Pictures
- Release date: February 14, 1999
- Running time: 108 minutes
- Country: United States
- Language: English

Funny Valentines is a 1999 American drama film directed by Julie Dash and starring Alfre Woodard. It is based on J. California Cooper's short story of the same name. The film was produced by Starz! Pictures and released in selected theatres and later premiered on cable television.

== Synopsis ==
Looking to escape a troubled marriage, a woman returns to her hometown, where she repairs a broken friendship with her cousin and finds true happiness.

== Cast ==
- Alfre Woodard as Joyce May
- Loretta Devine as Dearie B.
- CCH Pounder as Ethel B.
- Peter Jay Fernandez as Danny
- Megalyn Echikunwoke as Lauren
- Kajuana Shuford as Gail
- Kiara Tucker as Young Joyce
- Saycon Sengbloh as Young Dearie B.
- Christopher Dunn as Robert Earl
- Tom Wright as Dr. Thomas Holder
- Von Coulter as Troy Watts

== Production ==
Filming occurred in Wilmington, North Carolina. This is the second movie co-starring Alfre Woodard and Loretta Devine after Down in the Delta.

== Critical response ==
The film and performances received positive reviews from critics. Laura Fries from Variety wrote in her review: "Director Julie Dash fosters a real sense of affection for these characters. Like her film debut, Daughters in the Dust, Dash provides a lush atmosphere, creating a visual treat with intricate flashback sequences and inviting locations."

At The 2000 Black Reel Awards, the film received five nominations.
