= Brothers of the Borderland =

- Directed by: Julie Dash
- Screenplay by: Ronald Taylor
- Narrated by: Oprah Winfrey
- Release date: 2004
- Country: United States
- Language: English

Brothers of the Borderland is a 2004 film directed by American filmmaker Julie Dash. The film is on display as an immersive film experience at the National Underground Railroad Freedom Center in Cincinnati, Ohio.

== Plot ==
Brothers of the Borderland tells the story of a female slave who escapes to freedom with assistance from John Parker, a free black man, and Rev. John Rankin, a white minister. The 25-minute-long film features narration from Oprah Winfrey and displays in an immersive, experiential theater. The film takes place on the Kentucky-Ohio border and features a crossing of the Ohio River.

== Cast ==
- Oprah Winfrey as Narrator
- Giselle Jones as Alice

== Critical reception ==
The Cincinnati Enquirer described the film as a "full sensory experience" inside a "tree-lined 'environmental' theater where fog rises from the floor and 'bullets' whiz by."
