= Dangerous Passion =

- DVD Cover of "Dangerous Passion".
- Genre: Thriller
- Written by: Brian Taggert
- Directed by: Michael Miller
- Starring: Carl Weathers; Billy Dee Williams; Lonette McKee
- Theme music composer: Rob Mounsey
- Country of origin: United States
- Original language: English

Production
- Executive producers: John Davis; Andrew Hill
- Producer: Paul Pompian
- Cinematography: Steven Shaw
- Editor: Janet Bartels-Vandagriff
- Running time: 94 minutes
- Production companies: Carolco Pictures; Davis Entertainment; Stormy Weathers Production

Original release
- Network: ABC
- Release: March 25, 1990

Dangerous Passion is a 1990 American made-for-television crime thriller film starring Carl Weathers, Billy Dee Williams and Lonette McKee, and directed by Michael Miller. The film, produced by Carolco Pictures, premiered on the ABC network on March 25, 1990.

== Plot ==
A security expert Kyle Western (Weathers) begins working for the high-profile gangster Lou Jordan (Williams), who is an antique-car enthusiast. When Jordan shoots dead an intruder one evening, Western is pressured into taking the fall, in return for a large cash sum, to which Western hopes will enable him to buy Napa Valley land as an upright citizen. Soon after Jordan murders his own attorney in front of Western's eyes. Having already started an affair with Jordan's wife, Meg (McKee), Western decides to go on the run with her after discovering she is pregnant with his child. Trading the luxury car given to Western by his boss, the pair flee with Jordan's hitmen on their trial. However henchman Frank Carmen (Boswell) fatally stabs Meg Jordan in a coffee shop. The waitress Angela (Carrillo) witnesses the event, and flees, becoming sought after by both the henchmen and Western, as she is the only witness to be able to clear Western in Meg's murder. After a confrontation, Western kills Carmen, but another henchman, Walt (Tony DiBenedetto), kidnaps Angela. A final confrontation at Jordan's warehouse sees Western trade Lou his prized antique sports car for Angela. After escaping the warehouse Western detonates the explosives rigged on the car.

== Cast ==
- Carl Weathers as Kyle Western
- Billy Dee Williams as Lou Jordan
- Lonette McKee as Meg Jordan
- Michael Beach as Steve
- Charles Boswell as Frank Carmen
- L. Scott Caldwell as Ruby
- Elpidia Carrillo as Angela
- Leon Delaney as Rawlings
- Tony DiBenedetto as Walt
- Nancy Fish as Blake
- Rudy Ramos as Policeman
- Miguel Sandoval as Sergeant Hidalgo

== Background ==
Following the film's premiere in America during March 1990, it was released in the Philippines on 4 June 1991, and received a video premiere in Germany on 23 October 1991. In some European countries, the film was released under the title Action Jackson 2, to capitalize on the 1988 action film Action Jackson, which starred Weathers in the lead role.

The film was released on VHS and Laserdisc in America soon after its TV airing. It was also released on VHS in the UK during 1991, by Capital Home Video. On December 16, 2003, Lions Gate released the film on DVD in America. A Spanish version of the film was also issued on Region 2 DVD.

== Reception ==
Hal Erickson of Allmovie gave the film two and a half stars. He stated "This USA Cable network offering stars Carl Weathers as a none-too-ethical security expert. The cool, state-of-the-art cars driven by the protagonists are sometimes more fascinating than the by-the-numbers plotline."

TV Guide gave the film two of four stars, commenting "This is an expert retread of Hollywood crime formulas, infused with new life by a top-flight African-American cast. But the snugly constructed script stands on its own merits. The film rings true even when its skirmishes seem improbable. The film doesn't merely pit its enamored fugitives against an implacable foe; it picks at their own insecurities as they turn on each other in waves of mistrust. Weathers more than fits the movie star bill as a handsome tuna swimming among barracudas like Lou. Matching McKee's enticing performance as the self-destructive Meg is Billy Dee Williams, whose Lou isn't just a grabby businessman but a collector of souls. Dangerous Passion is an invigorating peek into the dark recesses of the human spirit - until McKee is killed off. Afterward, this once-promising film moves into more conventional macho action territory."
