= Daughters of the Dust =

1991 film by Julie Dash

- Theatrical release poster
- Directed by: Julie Dash
- Written by: Julie Dash
- Produced by: Lindsay Law; Julie Dash; Arthur Jafa; Steven Jones
- Starring: Cora Lee Day; Barbara O. Jones; Alva Rogers; Trula Hoosier; Umar Abdurrahamn; Adisa Anderson; Kaycee Moore
- Cinematography: Arthur Jafa
- Edited by: Amy Carey; Joseph Burton
- Music by: John Barnes
- Distributed by: Kino International
- Release dates: January 1991 (Sundance Film Festival); January 3, 1992 (United States)
- Running time: 112 minutes
- Country: United States
- Languages: Gullah, English
- Budget: $800,000

Daughters of the Dust is a 1991 American independent drama film written, directed, and produced by Julie Dash. It is the first feature film directed by an African-American woman to receive a theatrical release in the United States. Set in 1902, the film centers on three generations of Gullah (or Geechee) women from the Peazant family on Saint Helena Island, South Carolina, as they prepare to migrate from the rural South to the North.

The film received critical praise for its lush visuals, use of Gullah language, and non-linear narrative structure. The cast includes Cora Lee Day, Alva Rogers, Barbara-O, Trula Hoosier, Vertamae Grosvenor, and Kaycee Moore. Daughters of the Dust was filmed on location on Saint Helena Island, with Arthur Jafa serving as the director of photography. The film premiered at the Sundance Film Festival in 1991, where Jafa won the top cinematography award.

Daughters of the Dust was selected for preservation in the United States National Film Registry by the Library of Congress in 2004, being deemed "culturally, historically, or aesthetically significant." The film was restored and re-released in 2016 by the Cohen Media Group to mark its 25th anniversary. Additionally, Dash has authored two books related to the film: a making-of memoir co-written with Toni Cade Bambara and bell hooks, and a sequel novel set two decades after the events of the film.

== Plot ==
The film is set in 1902 and centers around the Peazant family, Gullah islanders living at Ibo Landing on Dataw Island (St. Simons Island), off the coast of Georgia. Their ancestors were brought to the island as enslaved people centuries ago. Over time, the islanders developed a unique language—known as Gullah or Sea Island Creole English—and culture, which is a creolized blend of West African traditions from the Igbo, Yoruba, Mende, and Twi peoples, along with some influence from the Bakongo of Central Africa and the cultures and languages of the British Isles. The common variety of English served as the superstratum in this case. Isolated on large plantations, the enslaved people maintained their distinct language and cultural practices, which have endured through the years. The dialogue in the film is in Gullah Creole.

Narrated by the Unborn Child, the future daughter of Eli and Eula, whose voice is shaped by the oral traditions and accounts of her ancestors, the film uses poetic imagery and a circular narrative structure to represent the past, present, and future of the Gullah people. The majority of the family is on the brink of leaving for the mainland to embrace a more modern, "civilized" way of life. The old ways and African ancestral history are embodied by Nana Peazant, the community matriarch, who continues to practice African spiritual rituals. As she bids her family to remember and honor their ancestors during their journey, Nana tells them, "We are two people in one body. The last of the old and the first of the new."

Viola and Yellow Mary, cousins with very different outlooks on life, arrive on the island from the mainland. Viola is a devout Christian, while Yellow Mary (who is 'high yellow,' i.e. mixed-race) is a free spirit who has brought her lover, Trula, from the city. They come to the island by boat for a final family dinner before Yellow Mary departs for Nova Scotia. Mr. Snead, a photographer from the mainland, accompanies Viola and takes portraits of the islanders before they depart from their way of life forever. Meanwhile, a rift in Eli and Eula's marriage unfolds, as Eula is about to give birth after being raped by a white man on the mainland. Eli struggles with the possibility that the unborn child may not be his, while also feeling pressure from his mother to stay connected to his ancestors. The unborn child narrates the film, tracing the legacy of her family before her birth.

Several other family stories unfold within this narrative. Haagar, a cousin, finds the old spiritual beliefs and provincialism of the island to be "backwards" and is eager to leave for a more modern society with educational and economic opportunities. Her daughter, Iona, longs to be with her secret lover, St. Julien Lastchild, a Cherokee who lives on the island. On the day Iona is set to leave, Lastchild gives her a letter confessing his love and asking her to stay.

As the women prepare a traditional feast, including okra, yams, and shellfish cooked on the beach, the men gather in groups nearby to talk and play games. The children and teenagers play, practice religious rites on the beach, and attend a Bible-study session led by Viola. Yellow Mary and Eula bond as survivors of sexual violence. Bilal Muhammad, a cousin believed to be of Igbo descent but hailing from the French West Indies, leads a Muslim prayer. Nana calls upon the spirits of the family’s ancestors, who once worked on the island’s indigo plantations. She combines the power of these ancestors with Viola’s Bible, symbolizing the old and the new.

Throughout the film, Eli and Eula reveal the history and folklore of the slave uprising and mass suicide at Ibo Landing. The Peazant family members must decide whether to leave the island for a new beginning or stay behind to preserve their way of life. Yellow Mary chooses to stay on the island, along with Eli and Eula. Iona, overcome with emotion, jumps off the boat just before departure. Lastchild, riding horseback, rushes to her side. Haagar calls out for her daughter but is held back by another family member. The remaining family members watch as most of the Peazants leave the island for the last time.

== Cast ==
- Cora Lee Day as Nana Peazant – matriarch of the Peazant family, determined to stay on the island.
- Adisa Anderson as Eli Peazant – Nana's grandson, torn between traveling north and staying on the island.
- Alva Rogers as Eula Peazant – Eli's wife, who was raped by a white man and is now pregnant.
- Kay-Lynn Warren as Unborn Child – the spirit of Eula's unborn child, who is Eli's daughter, narrates much of the film and magically appears as a young girl in some scenes before her birth.
- Kaycee Moore as Haagar Peazant – Nana's strong-willed granddaughter-in-law, who is leading the migration north.
- Cheryl Lynn Bruce as Viola Peazant – one of Nana's granddaughters, she has already moved to Philadelphia and become a fervent Christian.
- Tommy Hicks as Mr. Snead – a photographer from Philadelphia, engaged by Viola to document the family's life on the island before they leave it for the North.
- Bahni Turpin as Iona Peazant – Haagar's daughter, in love with St. Julian, a Native American who will not leave the island.
- M. Cochise Anderson as St. Julien Lastchild.
- Barbara-O as Yellow Mary – another of Nana's granddaughters, she returns from the city for a final visit to the island and her family, along with her lover, Trula.
- Trula Hoosier as Trula – Yellow Mary's young lover.
- Umar Abdurrahman as Bilal Muhammad – a practicing Muslim, and a pillar of the island community.
- Cornell Royal as "Daddy Mac" Peazant – patriarch of the family.

== Production ==
=== Development ===
Originally conceived in 1975, Dash planned to make a short film with no dialogue as a visual account of a Gullah family's preparation to leave their Sea Island home to a new life in the North. She was inspired by her father's Gullah family, who migrated to New York City in the early 20th century during the Great Migration of African Americans from the southern states. Her narrative forms were also inspired by the writing of Toni Morrison, Alice Walker and Melville Herskovits. As the story developed for more than 10 years, Dash clarified her artistic vision; and together with Arthur Jafa, her cinematographer and co-producer, she put together a short film to use for marketing.

She initially was rejected by Hollywood executives, as this was to be her first full-length film. Dash said they thought it was "too different" as she thought their reaction was part of a systematic exclusion of black women from Hollywood. Persisting, Dash finally got $800,000 financing from the PBS series American Playhouse in 1988.

=== Casting ===
With funding secured, Dash and casting director Len Hunt cast a number of veterans of black independent cinema in various roles, as a tribute to the work they had done and the sacrifices they had made to work in independent films. She would hire a mix of union and non-union members for her crew, with the latter being cast for their familiarity with the Gullah language, which the main actors would have to learn. Rogers had one previous film credit with School Daze and was known for her work as a playwright and vocalist, while Jones had worked previously with Dash in the short Diary of an African Nun (1977), and Grosvenor was a culinary anthropologist with a Gullah background.

=== Dialogue and narrative structure ===
For the sake of authenticity and poetry, the characters from the island speak in Gullah dialect. Ronald Daise, author of Reminiscences of Sea Island Heritage (1987), was the dialect coach for her actors, none of whom knew Gullah at the start of production.

The narrative structure is non-linear, of which Dash explained:

I didn't want to tell a historical drama about African-American women in the same way that I had seen other dramas. I decided to work with a different type of narrative structure...[and] that the typical male-oriented western-narrative structure was not appropriate for this particular film. So I let the story unravel and reveal itself in a way in which an African Gullah would tell the story, because that's part of our tradition. The story unfolds throughout this day-and-a-half in various vignettes. It unfolds and comes back. It's a different way of telling a story. It's totally different, new.

=== Principal photography ===
Director of photography Arthur Jafa began shooting on location at St. Helena Island and Hunting Island, off the South Carolina coast. Principal photography lasted 28 days, with a majority of the time spent shooting at exterior locations, such as the beach, in front of rustic homes, or further inland, where Nana's home is located near the island's graveyard. The sets, including cabins, the graveyard, and a figurative-sculpture dock at Igbo Landing, were constructed mostly using materials the Gullah would have had available at the time of the story. The costumes feature the women in long indigo-dyed and bright white dresses. The majority of closeups in the film are on the women, and the majority of dialogue is spoken by women and girls. American artist Kerry James Marshall handled production design, brought on by Jafa despite never meeting before.

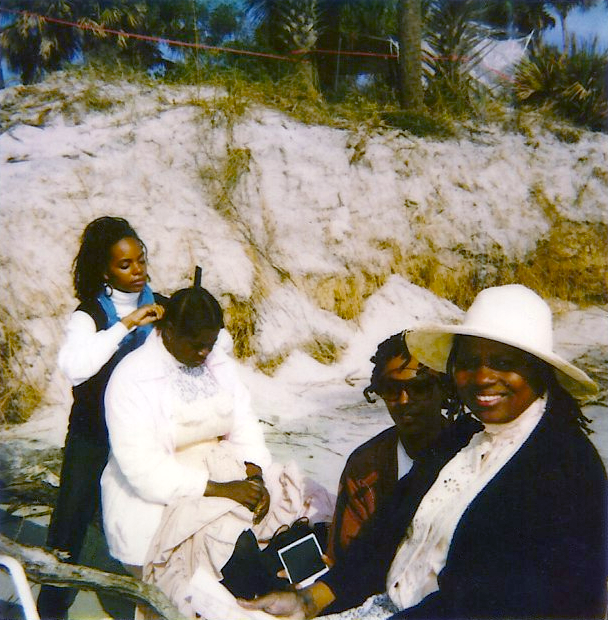
Hairstylist Pamela Ferrell (first from left) on the set of Daughters of the Dust, styling the hair of the actresses.

The key make-up artist and hair designer for Daughters of the Dust is Pamela Ferrell. During production, Ferrell worked very close with Julie Dash to help provide creative details needed for the vision and style of every scene in the movie. Ferrell also worked with the actors and actresses on set, where she detailed the make-up for each scene to help get the desired aesthetic.

During production on Hunting Island, the crew was evacuated to Charleston, South Carolina to avoid the incoming Hurricane Hugo. Hugo changed track and scored a direct hit on Charleston, causing a historic amount of damage.

Often, the cast would have to come to set on a last-minute notice because of the environmental factors that took place.

=== Post-production ===
Editing began in January 1990, and it took nearly a year to complete the film. Dash chose not to use subtitles, preferring to have audiences be immersed in the language; subtitles only appear in two key scenes in the film, to ensure audiences grasp important plot elements. The soundtrack was composed by John Barnes, featuring a blend of Synclavier percussion with traditional instruments, including the Middle Eastern santour, and African bata and talking drums.

=== Release ===
Daughters of the Dust screened at the 1991 Sundance Film Festival where it was nominated for the Grand Jury Prize and won the Excellence in Cinematography Award. It was released by Kino International—the first feature film made by an African-American woman to be distributed theatrically in the United States.

== Reception ==
The film opened in January 1992 to mostly critical acclaim. The film holds a 94% approval rating on Rotten Tomatoes, based on 77 reviews, with a weighted average of 7.6/10. The site's consensus reads: "Daughters of the Dust addresses its weighty themes with lovely visuals and a light, poetic touch, offering an original, absorbing look at a largely unexplored corner of American culture". Metacritic, which uses a weighted average, assigned the film a score of 81 out of 100, based on 18 critics, indicating "universal acclaim".

Patricia Smith, writing in The Boston Globe, described it as "a film that belongs to black women, a film rich with our faces, voices and movement. It is a film full of our colors, dictated by our traditions and ruled by our moods."

Stephen Holden of The New York Times lauded the film's languid pace and "spellbinding visual beauty" while noting that its unconventional narrative structure made the characters in relation to the story at times difficult to follow. Critic Stephen Holden said the individual stories in the film formed a "broad weave in which the fabric of daily life, from food preparation to ritualized remembrance, is ultimately more significant than any of the psychological conflicts that surface." He hailed Dash as a "strikingly original film maker."

Roger Ebert of The Chicago Sun Times gave the film three stars out of a possible four. He called the Daughters of the Dust a tone-poem about emotions rather than telling a conventional narrative, and said while made on a small budget "it doesn't feel cheap" due to excellent use of cinematography, wardrobe and music. He also highlighted the screenplay's Gullah dialect: "The fact that some of the dialogue is deliberately difficult is not frustrating, but comforting; we relax like children at a family picnic, not understanding everything, but feeling at home with the expression of it."

In 2022, Daughters of the Dust was named at number 60 in the Sight & Sound Greatest Films of All Time list selected by critics and published every 10 years since 1952.

Upon its 2016 re-release, The Village Voice review commended the film's "stunning motifs and tableaux, the iconography seemingly sourced from dreams as much as from history and folklore." The Guardian critic Peter Bradshaw called the film "mysterious, fabular and sometimes dreamlike," comparing it to Chekhov or a performance of Shakespeare's Tempest.

Despite the positive reviews, Dash was unable to make another feature-length motion picture within the mainstream Hollywood system. She concluded industry executives were put off by the film's unconventional form, stating in 2007: "Hollywood and mainstream television are still not quite open to what I have to offer." However, Dash would go on to a productive television career.

The Library of Congress added Daughters of the Dust to the National Film Registry in 2004, noting its status as the first feature-length film by an African-American woman to receive wide theatrical release, calling it an "evocative, emotional look at family, era and place."

== Restoration and re-release ==
For its 25th anniversary, the Cohen Media Group restored Daughters of the Dust for a screening at the 2016 Toronto Film Festival and a theatrical release. When Beyoncé's acclaimed visual album Lemonade aired on HBO and online in the spring of that year, critics noted that Lemonade made several visual references to Daughters of the Dust. Beyoncé's modern take featured young women, some in long white dresses, walking toward a beach or settled on the front porch of a rustic island cabin. The homage brought attention to the film in articles for Vanity Fair, Rolling Stone, NPR, and Essence. With new acclaim, Daughters of the Dust was re-released in theaters in November 2016, along with a new trailer and poster.

== Awards and nominations ==
- Sundance Film Festival – Excellence in Cinematography Award, nominated for Grand Jury Prize, 1991
- Selected for National Film Registry of the Library of Congress, 2004
- Cascade Festival of African Films, Portland, Oregon – Excellence in Cinematography Award, 2005
- New York Film Critics Circle Awards – Special Award, 2016

== Related books ==
Dash has written two books related to Daughters of the Dust:

- Co-authored with Toni Cade Bambara and bell hooks, Daughters of the Dust: The Making of an African American Woman's Film (1992). The book includes the screenplay.
- Daughters of the Dust: A Novel (1997), a sequel set 20 years after the passage explored in the film. Amelia, a young anthropology student who grew up in Harlem, goes to the Sea Islands to meet her mother's relatives and learn about their culture. The novel was selected in 2011 for the Charleston County Public Library's One Book Program.

== See also ==
- Gullah people
- Sea Island Creole English
- Igbo Landing
