= Four Women (1975 film) =

- Directed by: Julie Dash
- Produced by: Winfred Tennison
- Starring: Linda Martina Young
- Cinematography: Robert Maxwell
- Music by: Nina Simone
- Release date: 1975
- Running time: 8 minutes
- Country: United States

Four Women is a 1975 short experimental film produced and directed by Julie Dash featuring music by Nina Simone.

== Summary ==
Dancer Linda Martina Young captures the spirit of four women: Aunt Sarah, Saffronia, Sweet Thing and Peaches to the Nina Simone ballad "Four Women". The women represent stereotypes of black women as they attempt to survive in America.

== Production ==
Linda Martina Young choreographed the dance performance, which Dash refers to as a "choreopoem".

The film is celebrated as one of the first experimental films by a black woman filmmaker. The film, unlike others that portrayed the positive aspects of black womanhood, explored the negative realities many black women face in America.

== Restoration ==
In addition to the original 16mm rolls, a new print was created from the color negative A/B rolls and original track negative.

=== Screenings ===
- Cinema Remixed and Reloaded Exhibit, Spelman College Museum of Fine Art, 2007
- One Way or Another: Black Women's Cinema, BAMcinematek, 2016
- L.A. Rebellion: Creating a New Black Cinema Exhibit
- We Wanted a Revolution: :Black Radical Women, 1965-1985, Brooklyn Museum, 2017.
