= Julie Dash =

American filmmaker and author (born 1952)

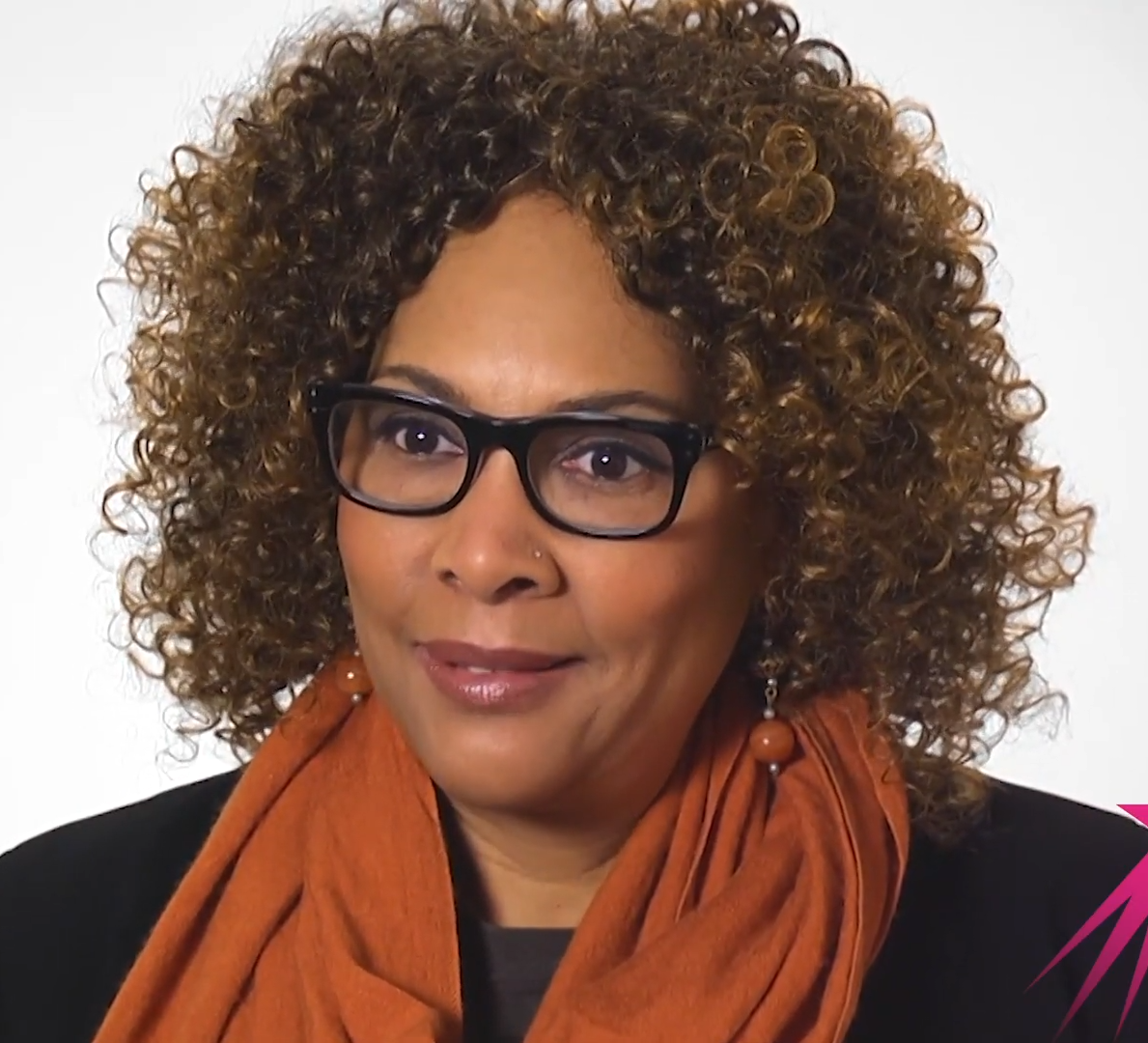
- Dash in 2020
- Born: October 22, 1952 (age 74); New York City, New York, U.S.
- Education: City College of New York (BA); American Film Institute (MFA); University of California, Los Angeles (MFA)
- Occupations: Film director, producer, screenwriter
- Years active: 1973–present
- Notable work: Daughters of the Dust (1991)
- Spouse: Arthur Jafa (divorced)
- Children: 1

Julie Ethel Dash (born October 22, 1952) is an American filmmaker, music video and commercial director, author, and website producer. Dash received her MFA in 1985 at the UCLA Film School and is one of the graduates and filmmakers known as the L.A. Rebellion.

The L.A. Rebellion refers to the first African and African-American students who studied film at UCLA. Through their collective efforts, they sought to put an end to the prejudices of Hollywood by creating experimental and unconventional films. The main goal of these films was to create original Black stories and bring them to the main screens. After Dash had written and directed several shorts, her 1991 feature Daughters of the Dust became the first full-length film directed by an African-American woman to obtain general theatrical release in the United States. In 2004, Daughters of the Dust was named to the National Film Registry by the Library of Congress for its "cultural, historical or aesthetic significance". Stemming from the film's success, Dash also released novels of the same title in 1992 and 1999. The film was later a key inspiration for Beyoncé's 2016 album Lemonade.

Daughters of the Dust is a fictionalized telling of her father's Gullah family who lived off the coast of South Carolina and Georgia in 1902. Maintaining strong ties to African culture, traditions, and language, the Peazant family reflects on the significance of their planned migration to the U.S. mainland. The film features black women's stories, striking visuals shot on location and a non-linear narrative. Dash has written two books on Daughters of the Dust—a "making of" history co-written with Toni Cade Bambara and bell hooks, and a sequel, set 20 years after the film's story. Daughters of the Dust continues to have a widespread cultural impact today, as it was named one of the most significant films of the last 30 years, by IndieWire.

Dash has worked in television since the late 1990s. Her television movies include Funny Valentines (1999), Incognito (1999), Love Song (2000), and The Rosa Parks Story (2002), starring Angela Bassett. The National Underground Railroad Freedom Center commissioned Dash to direct Brothers of the Borderland in 2004, as an immersive film exhibit narrated by Oprah Winfrey following the path of women gaining freedom on the Underground Railroad. In 2017, Dash directed episodes of Queen Sugar on the Oprah Winfrey Network. Continuing her work in television, Dash has directed episodes of several TV series, namely Our Kind of People, Women of the Movement, and Reasonable Doubt, throughout 2021 and 2022.

At the 2019 Sundance Film Festival, it was announced Dash's next major project will be a biopic of civil rights activist Angela Davis, to be produced by Lionsgate.

As of 2017, along with working in television, Dash was named a Diana King Endowed Professor in the Department of Art & Visual Culture at Spelman College. At Spelman, Dash is helping to develop a documentary filmmaking major. She has expressed that she enjoys using her "mechanical imagination" in her classes, focusing on elements such as frame composition and lighting. While using editing software like Premiere Pro in class, she mentioned in an interview that she misses having filmstrips around her neck.

Dash has been a member of the Directors Guild of America since 1996.

== Early life and education ==
Dash was born on October 22, 1952, in Queens, New York, to Rhudine Henderson and Charles Edward Dash. She graduated from Jamaica High School then, went on to receive a B.A. in film production from the City College of New York in 1974. She was raised in the Queensbridge Housing Project in Long Island City, Queens. She studied in 1969 at the Studio Museum in Harlem. As an undergraduate, she studied psychology until she was accepted into the film school at the Leonard Davis Center for the Performing Arts at City Colleges of New York, CCNY. In 1974, she earned her Bachelor of Arts degree in Film Production. As a student, Dash wrote the script for a documentary for the New York Urban Coalition, titled Working Models of Success.

After graduating from CCNY, she moved to Los Angeles for graduate studies. She completed a two-year Conservatory Fellowship in Producing/Writing at AFI Conservatory. There she studied under filmmakers, including Ján Kadár, William Friedkin, and Slavko Vorkapich. She attended graduate school at the UCLA Film School and became one of a new generation of African and African-American filmmakers known as the "Black insurgents" or L.A. Rebellion.

She directed Working Models of Success (1976), and the next year, produced Four Women (1975), a short dance film based on a song by Nina Simone. It won a gold medal for Women in Film in the 1978 Miami International Film Festival. As a graduate student at UCLA, she received an MFA in Film and Television Production. She directed the film Diary of an African Nun (1977). Screened at the Los Angeles Film Exposition, it earned a Directors Guild Award for a Student Film.

== Career ==
=== Early career ===
During film school, Dash was influenced by avant-garde, Latin American, African, and Russian cinema. Dash's film work began to take on a new direction after film school. Dash said in a 1991 interview with the Village Voice: "I stopped making documentaries after discovering Toni Morrison, Toni Cade Bambara, and Alice Walker. I wondered, why can't we see movies like this? I realized I needed to learn how to make narrative movies." Being inspired by the novels of these black women authors led to her decision to direct dramatic films.

=== Four Women (1975) ===
Her 1975 short film Four Women is based on the ballad "Four Women" by Nina Simone. In the song, four women are portrayed (all by the dancer Linda Martina Young): Aunt Sarah, a slave, Saffronia, a mixed-race woman, Sweet Thing, a prostitute, and Peaches, as a representation of black women overcoming racial and gender-specific forms of oppression. The first character shown is Aunt Sarah who wears a long dress and represents slavery. The next character is Saffronia who wears a black dress and a black veil. She is a mixed-race woman who is the product of her mother being raped by a white man. The next character, Sweet Thing, is a prostitute. She wears a floral print dress and she is no longer covered by a veil. The last character is Peaches, who represents a black woman who has been toughened by generations of oppression. She wears cornrows, a brightly colored tube top, and matching pants. The overall message of this short is to show the different struggles that many black women are subjected to. Stereotypes of black women are directly addressed, asking the audience to address their own biases and stereotypes.

From 1978 to 1980, Dash worked as member of the Classifications and Ratings Administrations for the Motion Picture Association of America. She had a special assignment screening at the Cannes International Film Festival to review a screening of short films in the Marché du Cinema.

=== Diary of an African Nun (1977) ===
Dash's 1977 short film Diary of an African Nun (13 minutes) was made during her tenure at UCLA. Adapted from Alice Walker's short story of the same name, this feature follows a young nun (Barbara O. Jones) in Uganda who is riddled with emptiness and doubt as she ponders her vows and union with Christ. As the nights wear on, the rhythmic beating of drums in the village intensifies her anguish and worsens her anxieties. The graphic simplicity within Diary of an African Nun coupled with Dash's poetic and political style won her a Directors Guild Award for student filmmaking at the Los Angeles Film Exposition. This style of narrative filmmaking directly challenged the conventions upheld by a longstanding history of white, male production. Diary of an African Nun is equipped with a certain intensity that foreshadows Dash's later works such as Daughters of the Dust.

=== Illusions (1982) ===
She wrote and directed the short film Illusions (34 minutes), which explores racial and sexual discrimination in Hollywood and American society. Released in 1982, it was her first to earn more widespread success and attention. Set in 1942 in the fictional National Studios, it follows a black woman executive, Mignon Duprée, who has "passed" for white to achieve her position. Also featured is Ester Jeeter, a black woman who dubs the singing voice in musicals for a white Hollywood star. They work in an industry based on creating images and alternative realities. The film explores Mignon's dilemma, Ester's struggle to get roles as an actress and singer rather than dub for others, and the uses of cinema in wartime: three illusions in conflict with reality.

Illusions received the 1985 Black American Cinema Society Award and the Black Filmmaker Foundation's Jury Prize in 1989 as best film of the decade. Kevin Thomas of the Los Angeles Times described it as "a gripping critique of the power of the movies to shape perception", while exploring the illusions created by Hollywood, as well as the illusion of racial identity. The success of this film and other shorts enabled Dash to move to feature films. In 2020, the film was selected for preservation in the United States National Film Registry by the Library of Congress as being "culturally, historically, or aesthetically significant".

=== Daughters of the Dust (1991) ===
Dash began work on a story in 1975 that was inspired by her father's Gullah family background and immigration from the Sea Islands of Georgia. This would become the screenplay Daughters of the Dust, which went into production after she received $800,000 in financing from PBS in 1988. The film, set in 1902, revolves around three generations of Gullah women in the Peazant family on St. Helena Island off the coasts of Georgia and South Carolina. Innovative with its use of Gullah dialogue and interwoven story-lines among the predominately female cast, the film focuses on ancestral and matriarchal story lines as well as the history of former slaves who settled on the island and formed an independent community there. The screenplay was written in the dialect of the island settlers with minimal subtitles, resulting in an immersive language experience.

Dash's experimental approach to narrative structure was something rarely seen in U.S. feature-filmmaking. Upon the film's re-release, she said: "I...wanted to do a film that was so deeply embedded in the culture, was so authentic to the culture that it felt like a foreign film." The film is told in way that an African griot would tell a story. A griot would recall a family's history over the course of days, all from their head. Dash brought in a Gullah consultant to help with the film.

Daughters of the Dust premiered at the Sundance Film Festival in 1991, where it was nominated for the Grand Jury Prize and won a cinematography award. It became the first feature film by an African-American woman to be distributed in the United States in theatrical release and gained critical praise for its use of dialect and music composed by John Barnes, as well for its cinematography and visual imagery.

The New York Times called Dash a "strikingly original film maker", noting that "for all its harsh allusions to slavery and hardship, the film is an extended, wildly lyrical meditation on the power of African cultural iconography and the spiritual resilience of the generations of women who have been its custodians."

The overriding intention for making this film was to make film about an African-American family who were not born into slavery. Dash also wanted to take a look at retention patterns, such as language, food, motor habits and aesthetics. Dash wanted to see all of this on film, as it had been previously denied due to the people making the film being mostly Europeans. This meant that the culture was not truly explored and the experiences of these families were being told from a European perspective.

Despite the critical acclaim, Dash was not able to get the financing to release another feature film, going on to work in television. Daughters of the Dust would continue to gain accolades for more than two decades. It was selected in 2004 for preservation in the United States National Film Registry by the Library of Congress as being "culturally, historically, or aesthetically significant". Its visuals would influence Beyoncé's 2016 video album Lemonade, featuring young women on the beach, dressed in white gowns as in the movie, and gathering in front of an island cabin. On its 25th anniversary, the Cohen Media Group restored and distributed Daughters of the Dust for theatrical release, beginning at the 2016 Toronto Film Festival. Other screenings in celebration of the Daughters of the Dust 25th anniversary included Honolulu Museum of Art, AFI Silver Theater, and ARRAY @ The Broad held in Los Angeles at Theater at Ace Hotel. In 2025, the Museum of Fine Arts Houston sponsored a screening of a 35mm print of Daughters of the Dust.

=== Styles and themes ===
Dash started making films around the time of the L.A. Rebellion at UCLA, which trained many young black filmmakers who all had their own aesthetic visions, however, they all sought a vision of black authenticity. The L.A. Rebellion at UCLA produced many prominent filmmakers who were determined to reimagine the media production process while uplifting and sharing authentically black stories. The films that they were making could serve as both entertainment and education. Dash, who was a major influence and participant of the L.A. Rebellion, had a common theme in her work which was showcasing the lives of black women and the struggles that they faced. The themes in her films coincide with the idea that the L.A. rebellion was rebelling against. Which was how black people would be portrayed in film following the rise in popularity of blaxploitation films. Not only did Dash's films showcase the lives of black people, but her work was also more primarily focused on the lives of black women and the struggles that are unique to black women. When making films she aims to say things that need to be said while saying it in a different way that hasn't been done before. In the video titled Julie Dash- The Reelback interview on YouTube, she says that her personal filmmaking mission statement is to redefine how we see African-American women on the screen. She wants to show their wants, their needs, their desires, their joys, their sorrows because all of the things that Dash was seeing bore little to no relation to the people she knew or the women who raised her. She wanted to change that because she wanted to see African-American women portrayed differently on the screen.

One theme that is coherent throughout Dash's films, especially Daughters of the Dust and Illusions was the importance of remembrance and inheritance in African American culture. Black women take pride in sharing both their talent and their secrets to overcoming racist and sexist obstacles with younger generations. Dash's characters carry this sentiment. Nana Peazant longed that her family's African culture, language, and traditions would not be erased with most of their departure to the Mainland. She wanted them to achieve success while remembering their history and the sacrifices their ancestors made for their betterment (Daughters of the Dust). Similarly, Mignon wanted true stories depicted on cinema screens that would be relatable to all audiences—Black and white. She wanted Black women to take back ownership of their voice, craft, and talent (Illusions). All of these women wanted to leave the world knowing not only that their craft would live on, but that their children, loved ones, friends, and young Black people in general could take an easier route to discovering their true identity and freedom. One thing that these women did not want to pass on is their trauma. They endured hardships and sacrificed so that the new generation would not have to do the same. However, this is America; a system built upon structural racism and a racial hierarchy that scorns everyone who is not at the top. The trauma has endured. It has spanned decades with no end in sight. How do we stop it? One element that Dash's work achieves is emphasizing the importance of inheritance and the role that trauma plays in affecting multiple generations of Black Americans without recreating or causing new trauma.

=== Music videos ===
Dash directed videos for musicians, including Raphael Saadiq with Tony, Toni, Tone, Keb' Mo', Peabo Bryson, Adriana Evans, and Sweet Honey in the Rock. Her video for Tracy Chapman's "Give Me One Reason" was nominated for MTV's Best Female Vocalist in 1996.

=== Television ===
In 1997, Dash wrote and directed an episode of Women: Stories of Passion for the Showtime Cable Network, as well as Sax Cantor Riff, one of HBO's Subway Stories: Tales from the Underground for producers Jonathan Demme and Rosie Perez. Dash directed the television film Funny Valentines in 1999, an account of a well-to-do black woman's retreat from a troubled New York marriage to the Deep South and her childhood past. Alfre Woodard, an executive producer on the film, asked Dash to get involved. Dash wrote the screenplays and directed the television movies Incognito (1999), a romantic thriller made by BET Arabesque Films; and Love Song (2000), an MTV movie starring the Grammy award-winning singer Monica.

Actress and executive producer Angela Bassett asked Dash to direct the biopic The Rosa Parks Story in 2002. The film follows Parks and her husband Raymond (Peter Francis James) as they deal with the issues of segregation, Jim Crow laws and second-class status in 1950s Alabama, leading up to Parks' refusing to relinquish her seat on a city bus, leading to the Montgomery bus boycott. The Rosa Parks Story won several awards, including the NAACP Image Award for Best Television Movie. Dash was nominated for Outstanding Directorial Achievement in the 55th Annual Directors Guild Awards—the first African-American woman nominated in the category of Primetime Movies Made for Television.

In 2004, Dash made Brothers of the Borderland, a work commissioned by the National Underground Railroad Freedom Center. Narrated by Oprah Winfrey, the film features the character of Alice, an escaped slave whose story represents an amalgamation of historic figures. The film is shown in the Harriet Tubman theater, named for the fugitive slave woman who helped many others escape to freedom.

In December 2016, Dash guest-hosted on Turner Classic Movies to discuss dozens of films on the channel.

Dash joined the roster of female directors working on the second season of Ava DuVernay's Queen Sugar on the OWN Network in 2017. She continued this work in television in 2021 and 2022 by directing several episodes of TV series airing on HULU, FOX, CBS, BET and others. These series are Our Kind of People, Women of the Movement, and Reasonable Doubt.

=== Museum installations ===
Dash designed two rooms for the Metropolitan Museum of Art and VOGUE, In American: An Anthology of Fashion, featured at the NYC Met Gala 2022. Her room titles were Renaissance Revival Room and Greek Revival Parlor. Within the Renaissance Revival Room, Dash chose to highlight Anne Lowe's contribution to American fashion. Lowe was an extremely talented and exclusive gown designer in the 1940s. Due to the open and institutionalized racism in America during this time, Lowe never got recognition for her outstanding work. Dash took this opportunity to educate the world on Lowe's impact upon fashion with this exhibit. Her other room, the Greek Revival Parlor, Dash highlighted Eartha Kitt as Helen of Troy in Orson Well's Time Runs (1950). The MET Museum describes the impact of the room as, "a narrative blend of reimagined storytelling, archival film images, and a dramatic evocation of historical moments, we dive headfirst into a strange and intimate conversation with the fashions of Madame Eta Hentz, the mythological Muses, and Ms. Eartha Kitt. Eartha Kitt is Helen of Troy, arriving from Sparta and taking the city of Troy by storm."

Dash's other most recent museum installations include Standing at The Scratch Line, at the Philadelphia Museum of African American History, Philadelphia Museum of Art, and Shine a Light, a large-scale video mapping projection for the Charles H. Wright Museum in Detroit.

== Published works ==
- Daughters of the Dust: The Making of an African American Woman's Film, co-written with Toni Cade Bambara and bell hooks. The New Press, 1992, ISBN 1565840305
- Daughters of the Dust: A Novel, a sequel set 20 years after the passage explored in the film. Amelia, a young anthropology student who grew up in Harlem, goes to Dawtah Island to meet her mother's relatives and learn about their culture. Selected in 2011 for the Charleston County Public Library's "One Book Program". Plume, 1999, ISBN 0452276071

== Personal life ==
Dash met Arthur Jafa in the early 1980s during the shooting of the film My Brother's Wedding; she was the assistant director and he was an assistant cameraman. After the film ended they moved in together, and in 1983 they got married. In 1984, Dash and Jafa's daughter, named N'Zinga after an Angolan queen, was born. Jafa and Dash later divorced.

Dash loves to read and listen to audiobooks of Toni Morrison's work; she stated once that she has been "listening to Toni Morrison's audiobooks at night to help me go to sleep".

Dash still goes to the Sea Islands where they shot Daughters of the Dust; she shared in an interview that she goes there every couple of months because her uncle lives in Charleston and a lot of her family is buried there.

== Honors and awards ==
- Directors Guild Award for student filmmaking at the Los Angeles Film Exposition for Diary of an African Nun, 1977
- First Prize – Black American Cinema Society Award for Illusions, 1985
- Sundance Film Festival Excellence in Cinematography Award (Dramatic) for Daughters of the Dust; nominated for Grand Jury Prize, 1991
- Candace Award, National Coalition of 100 Black Women, 1992
- NAACP Image Award, Best Television Movie for The Rosa Parks Story; Best TV Movie Actress for Angela Bassett, 2002
- Family Television Award, Movies and Mini-Series for The Rosa Parks Story, 2002
- 55th Annual Directors Guild Awards – nominated for Outstanding Directorial Achievement on The Rosa Parks Story (first African-American woman nominated in the "Primetime Movies Made for Television" category), 2002
- Black Reel Awards: Outstanding Television Actress – Angela Bassett; Outstanding Television Supporting Actress – Cicely Tyson; Outstanding Television Screenplay, Original or Adapted – Paris Qualles; Outstanding Television Film for Rosa Parks Story, 2003
- New York Christopher Award for The Rosa Parks Story, 2003
- Daughters of the Dust selected for the National Film Registry of the Library of Congress, 2004
- Excellence in Cinematography Award for Daughters of the Dust, 15th Cascade Festival of African Films, Portland, Oregon, 2005
- Restoration and re-release of Daughters of the Dust, 2016
- Women & Hollywood Trailblazer Award, 2017
- New York Women in Film & Television MUSE Award, 2017
- New York Film Critics Special Award, 2017
- Robert Smalls Merit and Achievement Award, 2017
- WIFV Women of Vision Award, 2017
- Illusions selected for the National Film Registry of the Library of Congress, 2020
- Joseph R. Biden's President's Lifetime Achievement Award, 2022
- Elected honorary member of Alpha Kappa Alpha Sorority
- 82nd New York Film Critics Circle, Special Award
- The Ebert Award
- Inducted into the Penn Cultural Center's 1862 Circle on St. Helena Island

== Filmography ==
- Working Models of Success (1973) [documentary]
- Four Women (1975)
- Diary of an African Nun (1977)
- Illusions (1982) [also writer]
- Daughters of the Dust (1991) [also writer, producer]
- Praise House (1991)
- Subway Stories: Tales from the Underground (1997) (TV) [also writer, segment: "Sax Cantor Riff"]
- Women: Stories of Passion (1997) (TV) [also writer, 1 episode: "Grip Till It Hurts"]
- Incognito (1999) (TV)
- Funny Valentines (1999) (TV)
- Love Song (2000) (TV)
- The Rosa Parks Story (2002) (TV)
- Brothers of the Borderland (2004) [film for immersive museum exhibit]
- My Marlton Square (2009)
- Smuggling Daydreams Into Reality (2011)
- Standing at the Scratch Line (2016) [also writer]
- Queen Sugar (2017) (TV) [season 2: episode 9 – "Yet Do I Marvel", episode 10 – "Drums at Dusk"]
- Chloe X Halle (2021) Vogue
- Our Kind of People (2021) (TV) [season 1; episode 5 – "The Miseducation of the Negro"]
- Reasonable Doubt (2022) (TV) [season 1: episode 6 – "Renegade"]
- Women of the Movement (2022) (TV) [season 1; episode 4 – "Manhunt", episode 5 – "Mothers and Sons"]

=== Music videos ===
- Tracy Chapman, "Give Me One Reason" (1996)
- Tony! Toni! Tone!, "Thinking Of You" (1997)
- Adriana Evans, "Love Is All Around" (1997)

== See also ==
- Women's cinema
- List of female film and television directors
- Film director
- Black Filmmakers Hall of Fame
- American film directors
