= Cinema of Ethiopia =

Entertainment industry

- The Ethiopian National Theatre in Addis Ababa
- No. of screens: 273 (2016)
- Main distributors: Sebastobol Production

Produced feature films (2018)
- Total: 57
- Animated: 4
- Documentary: 12

The Ethiopian film industry is growing significantly marked by a surge in digital, locally produced Amharic-language films since 1990s and 2000s.

Historically, live stage theater enjoyed more popularity in Ethiopia, creating a handful of relatively successful stage actors. The first feature-length film was Who is Hirut's father?, which was released to the National Theatre in 1965. Moreover, Ethiopian films began modernizing in the 2000s, implementing Amharic, but due to wide home video and DVD distribution, they are often frustrated by copyright infringement in the presence of piracy. This was reduced in the early 2010s with the intervention of the government and the imposition of policy. Despite recent developments, the Ethiopian film industry continues to lack quality compared to modern world cinema and has a low budget amateurish style.

== History ==
The cinema of Ethiopia was introduced in 1897, two years after the first world film was projected on December 25, 1895, in Paris. However, the growth rate critically declined as a result of ongoing sociopolitical instability. Over decades, the Ethiopian film industry has been associated with cultural, religious, and national backgrounds and, under the pressure of its leaders, advanced historical and documentary films.

Berhanou Abebbé wrote in the 2003 article Annales d'Ethiopie that a Frenchman introduced the first cinematic artifacts in Ethiopia in 1898, sold to Italian minister Federico Ciccodicola. Ciccodicola then offered it to Emperor Menelik II as a gift. According to historians Berhanou and Richard Pankhurst, before the first public film screening occurred in (1909–1910), the Majesty watched several films over decades. In 1923, the first cinema house was completed and built by Ethiopians. Berhanou also noted that the first cinema house was called Pate; and it was owned by MM. Baicovich, which was functional from 1909 to 1910. During the first phase of cinema introduction, people were unsatisfactory to watch films. Berhanou quoted the French historian Merab, in his Impressions d'Ethiopie (1922), "people apparently didn't like to entertain themselves."

Pankhurst, a distinguished historian published his book Economic History of Ethiopia in 1968, further elaborated that the Armenians were attempted to project by 1909–10, but only attracted by temporary interest and soon abandoned it. Some natives misunderstandingly compared cinema to "devil work". Propelled by objection to the first house opened in 1923, the native labelled the cinema "Ye Seytan Bet" ("devil's house"). Chris Prouty noted that Ethiopia and Eritrea as the only country in Africa indifferent to foreign films. The first Ethiopian film au de Menilek was released in 1909 directed by Charles Martel. The first short film is 16mm black-and-white film, produced on the occasion of Empress Zewditu's coronation day in 1916. In addition, the coronation of Emperor Haile Selassie was filmed. There was also produced limited feature films. In 1965, the first ever feature length film titled Who is Hirut's father? released and directed by Elala Ibsa. The film story revolved around a woman named Hirut who meets her future husband and have a daughter. Soon, after moving from Nazreth to Addis Ababa, her husband jailed for 15 years and she and her daughter moved to Asmara to live better life. Then, her daughter faces social stigma for not having a father. In 2020, the film has been digitized and available for premiere for audience. In 1978, the Ethiopian Film Center to encourage film production, which was later replaced by Ethiopian Film Corporation in accordance with Decree No. 306/1986. It was produced 27 documentaries; two of whom are notable titled BehiywetZuria and Aster. However with the regime of Derg caused a split of sector with private investment.

Little was known before internationally grossed films revived in the 1990s. Most of renowned figures responsible for recognition of Ethiopian films internationally are Haile Gerima, Salem Mekuria, Yemane Demissie, and Teshome Gabriel. In 1993, the Ethiopian Filmmakers Association (EFIMA) was launched with objective of boosting the film growth in Ethiopia. At the time, the organization only have 27 founding members who were employees of the Ethiopian Film Corporation, the only public enterprise representing the film industry. The organization grew with 150 members representing five regions of the country. It has been called the pioneer association to bear filmmakers in Ethiopia.

In the 2000s, Ethiopian films exceptionally outgrown and implemented Amharic language. However, with distribution to DVD, some filmmakers worried about piracy. According to Addis Ababa Culture and Tourism Bureau, there was an increase of production into from 10 to 112 films in 2005–2012. In 2013, the Ethiopian government planned with stakeholders of various working sectors to draft a new film policy. These include imposing license, expanding film schools, taxations, increasing equipments, and helping filmmakers to encourage production in culturally and diversify background. However scholars such as Aboneh Ashagrie and Alessandro Jedlowski argued that the Ethiopian films may qualified to international premiere because of filmmaking preference in amateurish style and differ from foreign norms. There are also internationally grossed films in particular; Difret (2014) and Price of Love (2015) became the most acclaimed film whereas Rebuni (2015) and Yewendoch Guday (2007) were domestically successful films.

== Notable figures ==
=== Directors ===
- Abel Regasa
- Haile Gerima
- Alebachew Aragie
- Abraham Haile Biru
- Henok Mebratu
- Sewmehon Yismaw
- Natnael Asefa
- Theodros Teshome
- Saron Abera
- Kidist Yilma
- Rasselas Lakew
- Yared Zeleke
- Zeresenay Berhane Mehari
- Hermon Hailay
- Fitsum Asfaw
- Yared Shumete
- Mikyas Teka
- Henok Ayele
- Bereket Werede
- Yohannes Baye /Jani/
- Adanech Admassu
- Diribdil Assefa
- Fitsum Wondwossen
- Semagngeta Aychiluhem
- Dawit Shimelis
- Solomon Alemu Feleke
- Mesfin Getachew
- Hiwot Admasu
- Yeabsira E. Mandefro

=== Producers ===
- Surafel Daniel
- Theodros Teshome
- Henok Mebratu
- Natnael Asefa
- Kidst Yilma
- Meheret Mandefro
- Seyfedin Shifa

=== Actors/actresses ===
- Meron Getnet
- Selam Tesfaye
- Tizita Hagere
- Rasselas Lakew
- Makda Afewerk
- Martha Goytom
- Fryat Yemane
- Kidist Siyum
- Rediat Amare
- Abebe Balcha
- Addisalem Getaneh
- Eyob Dawit
- Alemseged Tesfaye
- Hanna Yohannes
- Daniel Tegegn
- Tariku Birhanu
- Hanan Tarik
- Mesfin Haileyesus
- Henok Berihun
- Michael Million
- Michael Tamire
- Amleset Muchie
- Ruta Mengistab
- Girum Ermias
- Mahder Assefa
- Liya Kebede
- Solomon Bogale
- Samson Tadesse
- Michael Shewangzaw
- Tigist Girma
- Mekdes Tsegay
- Muhammed Muftahi
- Meseret Gebru
- Ruth Negga
- Akrosia Samson
- Tensaye Yosef
- Frey Dagne
- Yohannes Ashenafi
- Sam Desu
- Yafet Henock
- Senait Ashenafi
- Zeritu Kebede
- Kassahun Fisseha
- Yigerem Dejene
- Tesfu Birhane
- Meseret Mebrate
- Tedros Kassa
- Behailu Engida
- Solomon Alemu Feleke
- Serawit Fikre
- Girum Zenebe

=== Screenwriters ===
- Alebachew Aragie
- Theodros Teshome
- Bereket Werede
- Beza Hailu
- Yared Zeleke
- Henok Mebratu
- Zeresenay Berhane Mehari
- Natnael Asefa
- Hermon Hailay
- Semagngeta Aychiluhem
- Mesfin Getachew
- Kidst Yilma
- Fitsum Asfaw

== Notable films ==
=== Domestically successful films ===
- Gudifecha (ጉዲፈቻ)
- Kezkaza Welafen (ቀዝቃዛ ወላፈን)
- Abay vs Vegas (አባይ ወይስ ቬጋስ)
- Sost Maezen (ሶስት ማእዘን)
- Taza (ታዛ)
- Beza (ቤዛ)
- Yewendoch Guday (የወንዶች ጉዳይ)
- Enkoklesh (እንቆቅልሽ)
- Lattekemegne (ላጠቅመኝ)
- Balekelem Helmoch (ባለቀለም ህልሞች)
- Hiroshima (ሂሮሽማ)
- Rebuni (ረቡኒ)
- Kerbie (ከርቤ)
- Wede Lijenet (ወደ ልጅነት)
- Siryet (ስርየት)
- Laundry Boy (ላውንደሪ ቦይ)

=== Internationally successful films ===
- Megnot (Two Hearts)
- Difret
- Lamb
- Triangle: Going to America
- Triangle: Peak of intimacy
- Enchained (ቁራኛዬ)
- Selanchi
- Teza
- The Athlete
- The Price of Love
- Doka
- Lambadina
- Harvest: 3,000 Years
- Blood Is Not Fresh Water
- Running Against the Wind
- Faya Dayi

== Major events ==
=== Festivals ===
- Addis International Film Festival – This festival is held annually in Addis Ababa, and seeks to provide a platform for both amateur and professional filmmakers. It was created in 2007.
- Ethiopian International Film Festival – annually held in Addis Ababa during which many Ethiopian film makers get to showcase their work and awards are handed to the best films as voted by the judges. This festival was started in 2005.

=== Awards ===
- Gumma Film Awards – The most known and prestigious award in the Ethiopian film industry. Held in Addis Ababa, Ethiopia annually, this award show started in 2014 and is the first film award show to be broadcast live on some television channels.

== Cinema-related organizations ==
=== Film schools ===
- Blue Nile Film and Television Academy
- Yofthahe Nigussie School of Theatrical Arts
- Addis Ababa University Visual and Performing Arts
- Sami-Multimedia Film and Photography School (Adama, Oromia)
- University of Gondar film and television department
- Bahirdar university cinema and theatre arts department

== Notable movie theatres ==
- Sebastopol Cinema
- Gast Cinema
- Alem Cinema
- Century Cinema
- Agona Cinema
- Mati Multiplex
- Cinema Empire
