= List of Leza Awards editions =

This is list of editions of Leza Awards, an Ethiopian music and film award held in Hilton Hotel in Addis Ababa since 2010.

== 2016 ==
The fifth edition of Leza Awards was scheduled on 1 October 2015 at Hilton Hotel in Addis Ababa. Organized by Birhanu Digaffe, a radio host and producer, the final list of nominees drawn from the field of music and film was released to the public.

=== Best Music Album ===
- Siwedlat - Madingo Afework
- Astaraki - Abinet Agonafir
- Meche New - Yosef Gebre
- Zebenay - Dan Admasu
- Yeneta - Tsehaye Yohanis
- Manew Fitsum - Betty G

=== Best Music Single ===
- "Seba Dereja" - Teddy Afro
- "Sidet" - Yegna
- "Seifhen Ansa" - Zeritu Kebede
- "Alsemam" - Jacky Gossy
- "Mal Naweya" - Abinet Agonafir
- "Hagere" – Mahmoud Ahmed
- "Yefikir Girma" – Tsedenia Gebremarkos

=== Best Music Video ===
- "Shik Biles" by Yosef Gebre
- "Astaraki" by Abinet Agonafir
- "Manew Yalew" by Abinet Agonafir
- "Tangut" by Madingo Afework
- "Nana Demaye" by Betty G
- "Keza Sefer" by Tamrat Desta

=== Best New Album ===
Zebenay by ዳን አድማሱ(dan admasu) Ewnet by Hana Girma Manew Fisum by Betty G Selamta by Ras Janny

=== Best Film Score ===
- Tsedenya Gebremarkos in Hareyet
- Anteneh Minalu in Lamba
- Matias Yilma in Yaye Yifredew
- Kasahun Eshetu in Shefu 2
- Elias Husein in Fikirena Genzeb
- Hailu Amerga in Zetegn Mot

=== Lifetime Achievement ===
- Maritu legesse
- Alemayehu Eshete
- Bahta Gebrehiwot
- Dawit Yifru
- Girma Beyene
- Girma Negash
- Yohannis Afework

== 2019 ==
The 9th edition of Sheger FM Radio Leza Radio Show was held on 19 October 2019 at Hilton Hotel. Singer Chelina, who debuted her album in December 2018, took two of the 12 categories of the 9th Leza Listeners' Award - Album of the Year and Best Artist of the Year. In addition, the most acclaimed feature film named Quragnaye won three categories – Best Feature Film and Best Actress and Best Actor.

=== Single of the Year ― Presented by Teshome Sisay (Singer/Composer) ===
- "Belba" by Jambo Jote — WINNER
- "Ete Abay" by Abrham Belayneh "Sey" by Ephrem Amare
- "Tilobign" by Rahel Getu
- "Adimera" Yared Negu
- "Mahiya" Dany Magna

=== Best Actor in Television Series ===
Presented by Kurabachew Deneke (Playwright)

- Abebe Balcha (TV Series: Zemen on EBS) — WINNER
- Alemayehu Tadesse (Derso Mels on FANA)
- Yigerem Dejene (Mogachoch on EBS)
- Million Berhane (Zetenegnaw Shi on FANA)
- Solomon Bogale (Zemen on EBS)
- Michael Tamire (Min Litazez on FANA)

=== Best New Artist ===
Presented by Presented by Kuku Sebsebe (Singer)

- Chelina — WINNER
- Ziggy Zaga (Behailu Tafesse)

Jacky Gosee

- Yohana
- Hayleyesus Feyssa (Haile)
- Dag Daniel

=== Best Actor ===
Presented by Azeb Worku (Playwright)

- Zerihun Mulat (film: Quragnaye) — WINNER
- Henok Wondimu (Sumalew Vandam)
- Tariku Birhanu "Baba" (Mugnu Yarada Lij 4)
- Alemseged Assefa (Atifred)
- Cherinet Fikadu (Zemene)
- Girum Ermiays (Tefetari)

=== Song of the Year ===
Presented by Samuel Yirga (Musician and composer)

- Serkaleme by Ziggy Zaga (Behailu Tafesse) — WINNER
- Bati by Chelina
- Maye Kaja by Yohana
- Gum Semay by Ziggy Zaga (Behailu Tafesse)
- Habesha by Dag Daniel
- Selam Yisten by Gossaye Tesfaye

=== Best Actress ===
Presented by Aboneh Ashagre (Playwright/ Associate Professor)

- Yemisrach Girma (film: Quragnaye) — WINNER
- Meskerem Abera (Simet)
- Edelework Tassew (Wedefit)
- Melat Yirgalem (Berabish)
- Shewit Kebede (Wuha ena Werk)
- Kalkidan Tibebu (Zemene)

=== Best TV Series ===
Presented by Manyazewal Endeshaw (Theater/Film Director)

- Derso Mels on FANA (Directed by Meaza Worku; Kiba Multimedia Production/ Amad Film Production) — WINNER
- Mogachoch on EBS
- 'Zetenegnaw Shi on Fana
- Betoch on ETV
- Min Litazez on FANA
- Zemen on EBS

=== Best Album of the Year ===
- Hailu Mergia (Accordionist, keyboardist)
- Chelina by Chelina — WINNER

Nigus by Jah Lude

- Siyamish Yamegna by Gossaye Tesfaye
- Yohana by Yohana
- Korma by Ziggy Zaga (Behailu Tafesse)
- Balambaras by Jacky Gosee

=== Best Feature Film ===
Presented by Abraham Gezahegn (Screen writer, director, producer)

- Quragnaye (Directed by Moges Tafesse; Starring Zerihun Mulatu, Tesfaye Demam, Yemisrach Girma, Frehiwot Kelkilew, Feleke Kassa and Henok Zerabiruk)
- Tefetari
- Wedefit
- Zemene
- Mognu Yarada Lij 4
- Simet

=== Best Actress in Television Series ===
Presented by Hanna Terefe (Stage and screen actress)

- Hanna Yohannes (TV Series: Zemen on EBS) — WINNER
- Meskerem Abera (Min Litazez on FANA )
- Mekdes Tsegaye (Mogachoch on EBS)
- Christy Haile (Derso Mels on FANA)
- Mestawet Aragaw (Senselet on EBS)
- Martha Getachew (Derso Mels on FANA)

=== Best Music Video (Clip) ===
Presented by Hamelmal Abate (Singer)

- "Ke Ehud Eske Ehud" – Gossaye Tesfaye — WINNER
- "Benetselay"– Dawit Nega
- "Mircha Alat" – Yohana
- "Say Bay" – Chelina
- "Yebalewa Konjo" – Dag Daniel

Kedamawit – Jacky Gosee

=== Lifetime Achievement Award Recipient ===
Presented by Elias Tebabal (Singer)

== 2022 ==
The 12th edition of Leza Awards was held on 25 May 2022.

Best Single Music: Rophnan – SOST

Best Video Clip: Tilahun Gessesse – "Qome Limereqesh"

Best New Singer: Elias Melka and Dawit Tsige

Best Song of the Year: Meselu Fantahun – "Limeta Woyes Mita"

Best Drama Series: Eregnaye

Best Drama Series Actor: Million Berhane (Zetenegnaw Shi)

Best Drama Series Actress Direbworq Seyfu (Eregnaye)

Best Actress: Meskerem Abere (Ensaro)

Best Actor: Amanuel Habtamu (Ensaro)

Best Film: Ensaro

Best Album: Dawit Tsige (Yene Zema)

Lifetime Award: Selam Seyoum
