= List of the first films by country =

This is a list of the first films by country. This table shows the earliest known film productions by country, or successor state.

== List of the first films by country ==
Country	Year	Silent film	Sound recording	Colour film	Longest film	Notes
United Kingdom	1888	Roundhay Garden Scene (1888)	Algy the Piccadilly Johnny (1900); Blackmail (1929 film)	Representatives of the British Isles (1909)		
(United States) USA	1878	The Horse in Motion (1878)	The Dickson Experimental Sound Film (1895)	Children Forming the U.S. Flag (1909)	O.J.: Made in America (2016)	
France	1895	Workers Leaving the Lumière Factory (1895)	Le Cid (1900)	Vie et Passion du Christ (1903)	Out 1 (1971)	
Germany	1895	Akrobatisches Potpourri (1895)	Death of Othello (1907); I Kiss Your Hand, Madame (1929)	Casanova (1928)		
Italy	1896	Sua Santità papa Leone XIII (1896)	The Song of Love (film) (1930)	The Last Days of Pompeii (1926 film)	The Best of Youth (2003)	
Spain	1897	Salida de la misa de doce de la Iglesia del Pilar de Zaragoza (1897)	Fútbol, amor y toros (1929)	In a Corner of Spain (1949)		
Japan	1898	Bake Jizo (1898)	Reimai (1926); Fujiwara Yoshie no furusato (1930)	Gate of Hell (1953)		
Sweden	1912	A Ruined Life (1912)				
Denmark	1897	Kørsel med Grønlandske Hunde (1897)				
Netherlands	1896	Gestoorde hengelaar (1896)	Philips-Radio (1932)	Bloemenvelden Haarlem (1910)		
Hungary	1896	March at the Buda Castle (1896)	Kék Bálvány (1931)		Sátántangó (1994)	
Argentina	1897	La bandera Argentina (1897)			La Flor (2018)	
Czech Republic	1898	Výjezd parní stříkačky k ohni (1898)	Tonka of the Gallows (1930)	Jan Roháč z Dubé (1947)		
Switzerland	1922	Histoire de Monsieur Vieux-Bois (1922)				
Austria	1907	Am Sklavenmarkt (1907)	G’schichten aus der Steiermark (1929)			
Iran	1930	Abi and Rabi (1930)				
Poland	1894	Ślizgawka w Łazienkach (Skating-rink in the Royal Baths) (1894)	The Morality of Mrs. Dulska (film) (1930)			
Canada	1897	Niagara Falls (1897)				
Russia	1893	The jumping rider (1893)		The Nightingale (1936 film)		
Algeria	1963	Peuple en marche (1963)				
Taiwan	1922	The Eyes of Buddha (1922)				
South Africa	1911	The Great Kimberley Diamond Robbery (1911)	Sarie Marais			
(Bosnia and Herzegovina) Bosnia & Herzegovina	1985	Collapse (1985)				
Israel	1948	Bayit Ha'Arava (1948)				
Mexico	1898	Don Juan Tenorio (1898)				
Belgium	1909	De Reid van Antwerpen naar Kongo (1909)				
(Socialist Federal Republic of Yugoslavia) Yugoslavia	1947	Slavica (1947)				
Norway	1908	Fiskerlivets farer (1908)	Den store barnedåpen (1931)			
Greece	1906	Olympic Games (1906)	The Girl from Corfu (1956)			
Brazil	1897	Ancoradouro de Pescadores na Baía de Guanabara (1897)				
India	1898	Dancing scenes from "The Flower of Persia" (1898)	Alam Ara (1931)	Kisan Kanya (1937)		
Hong Kong	1909	Stealing a Roasted Duck (1909)	White Gold Dragon (1934)			
China	1905	Dingjun Mountain (1905)	Singsong Girl Red Peony (1930)		Tie Xi Qu: West of the Tracks (2003)	
Palestine	1911	The first film of Palestine (1911)				
Iceland	1915	Breiðafjarðareyjar (1915)				
Finland	1904	Novelty from Helsinki: School youth at break (1904)	Lahyn's Say It in Finnish (1931			
Colombia	1915	La hija del Tequendama (1915)				
Peru	1911	Los Centauros Peruanos (1911)	Resaca (1934)			
Chile	1897	El desfile en honor del Brasil (1897)				
Cuba	1897	Simulacro de incendio (1897)				
Uruguay	1923	Souls on the Coast (1923)				
(Georgia (country)) Georgia	1909	Berikaoba-Keenoba (1909)				
Estonia	1912	Utotškini lendamised Tartu kohal (1912)				
Puerto Rico	1953	Los Peloteros (1953)				
Vietnam	1923	Kim Vân Kiều (1923)				
Kazakhstan	1970	Kyz-Zhibek (1970)				
Australia	1896	Passengers Alighting from Ferry Brighton at Manly (1896)				
Nepal	1964	Aama (1964)				
Cambodia	1962	Kbone Chivt (1962)				
Jordan	1998	Abraham's Odyssey (1998)				
Nicaragua	1960	La Llamada de la muerte (1960)				
Portugal	1896	Saída do Pessoal Operário da Fábrica Confiança (1896)	A Severa (1931)	The Artist and the City (1956)		
Romania	1911	Amor fatal (1911)				
Egypt	1907	The Visit of the Khedive Abbas Helmi (1907)				
Philippines	1905	Luzon Lingerie (1905)			Evolution of a Filipino Family (2004)	
South Korea	1948	The Night before Independence Day (1948)	Chunhyangjeon (1935)			
Bulgaria	1915	Bulgarian is Gallant (1915)				
Venezuela	1897	Un célebre especialista sacando muelas en el gran Hotel Europa (1897)				
Croatia	1910	Sokolski slet (1910)				
Serbia	1904	The Coronation of King Peter the First (1904)				
Thailand	1923	Miss Suwanna of Siam (1923)				
Turkey	1914	Ayestefanos'taki Rus Abidesinin Yıkılışı (1914)				
Slovakia	1897	A Camp of Zingari Gypsies (1897)				
Slovenia	1898	Razgled po Ljubijani (1898)				
Indonesia	1950	Darah dan Doa (1950)				
Lebanon	1929	The Adventures of Elias Mabrouk (1929)				
Luxembourg	1922	Belgique - le charm de l'Ardenne (1922)				
Bangladesh	1927	Sukumari (1927)			Amra Ekta Cinema Banabo (2019)	
Morocco	1962	Children of the Sun (1962)				
Afghanistan	1939	Laila Majnoon (1939)				
Albania	1947	Kino Kronika Nr. 1 (1947)				
Singapore	1927	The New Immigrant (1927)				
Dominican Republic	1923	La Leyenda de Nuestra Señora de Altagracia (1923)				
Kyrgyzstan	1992	Gde tvoy dom, ulitka? (1992)				
Lithuania	1909	On the River Neman (1909)				
Ukraine	1910	Shemelko-Denshchyk (1910)				
Bolivia	1925	Corazón Aymara (1925)				
Latvia	1930	Lāčplēsis (1930)				
Iraq	1948	Alia et Issam (1948)				
Azerbaijan	1898	The Oil Guzh in Balakhany (1898)				
Pakistan	1929	Husn Ka Daku (1929)				
Armenia	1919	Ravished Armenia (1919)				
Costa Rica	1930	El Retorno (1930)				
Ecuador	1924	El Tesoro de Atahualpa (1924)				
(Republic of Ireland) Ireland	1910	A Lad from Old Ireland (1910)				
Malaysia	1933	Leila Majnun (1933)	Laila Majnun (1933)			
Montenegro	1922	Voskresenja ne biva bez smrti (1922)				
New Zealand	1898	Opening of the Auckland Industrial and Mining Exhibition (1898)				
Ethiopia	1965	Who is Hirut's father? (1965)				
Mongolia	1936	The Mongolian Boy (1936)				
Panama	1929	LosAbismos de la vida (1929)				
Belarus	1926	Tales of the Woods or True Forest Story (1926)				
Cameroon	1962	Aventure en France (1962)				
Greenland	1934	Palos brudefærd (1934)				
Guatemala	1949	Caribeña (1949)				
Kuwait	1971	Bas ya Bahar (1971)				
Saudi Arabia	1973	Language du geste (1973)				
Sri Lanka	1947	Kadawunu Poronduwa (1947)				
Bhutan	1989	Gasa lamai singye (1989)				
Burkina Faso	1971	No pincha (1971)				
Malta	1953	Malta Story (1953)				
Paraguay	1955	Codicia (1955)				

== See also ==
- History of film
- List of cinema of the world
- List of early color feature films
