= Prostitution in Ethiopia =

Prostitution in Ethiopia is legal, and widespread. Procuring (operating brothels, benefiting from prostitution, etc.) is illegal according to Article 634 of the Ethiopian Penal Code, as revised May 2005, however these laws are rarely enforced. Some feel it has contributed to the increased incidence of AIDS. Gender-based violence is a substantial problem among female sex workers in Ethiopia. There are approximately 200,000 female sex workers in the country, with the majority (57.5%) being 24 years old or younger, and 14% aged 19 or younger.

== Overview ==
Ethiopia has become a magnet for sex tourism, including child sex tourism. According to the U.S. Department of state's Human trafficking report, the central market in Addis Ababa is home to one of the largest collection of brothels in Africa, with girls as young as 8 years old in prostitution at these establishments.

A 2025 study in Jimma and Agaro towns in the Oromia Region found that 54.2% of female street sex workers had entered sex work before the age of 18. Early initiation was associated with factors such as lack of formal education, low parental education, rural-to-urban migration, parental loss or divorce, and peer influence. The study concluded that early involvement in street sex work in Jimma is strongly linked to socio-economic disadvantage, educational deprivation, and migration-related vulnerability. A study in Addis Ababa, Bahir Dar, and Hawassa examined the experiences of young women involved in sex work in relation to a peer-based comprehensive sexuality education (CSE) programme implemented in 2020 for young sex workers in Ethiopia. It found that many entered sex work due to a lack of social support, and that stigma contributed to their isolation. In areas affected by conflict-driven migration, young women entering sex work were often younger and more vulnerable to abuse and exploitation by brokers. The study concludes that CSE interventions should also include girls under 18 involved in sex work and involve wider institutions such as police, social services, and legal systems to address violence and improve outcomes.

A 2023 national survey of 6,085 female sex workers in Ethiopia found that the prevalence of syphilis was 6.2% across six cities and ten major towns. The median age of participants was 25 years, with most in the 20-24 age group. The study concluded that syphilis remains a significant public health concern among female sex workers in Ethiopia. The same survey found that inconsistent condom use among female sex workers in Ethiopia was 17.1% among the 6,085 participants. It also reported that inconsistent condom use was higher among those with depression compared to those without depressive symptoms. The survey additionally found that gender-based violence was common among female sex workers in Ethiopia, with 28.1% of participants reporting violence in the past 12 months. Among them, 12.7% experienced physical violence and 22.3% experienced sexual violence. The study also reported higher levels of violence among younger sex workers aged 15–24 and 25-34 compared to those aged 35 and above.

A 2020 paper on adolescent sex workers in Addis Ababa finds that girls migration from rural areas to the capital is driven by multiple factors, including escaping early marriage, family pressure, and hopes of better opportunities, after arriving in the city, many face unstable work, stigma, and exploitation, with a significant number entering sex work after failed or abusive domestic and informal jobs.

A 2019 survey of 4,900 female sex workers in eleven Ethiopian cities (mean age 24) found that 17.5% had experienced physical violence in the past year and 15.2% had experienced rape since entering sex work. Younger women, especially those aged 15–24, were at higher risk of physical violence.

A 2005 study by Bethlehem Tekola examining the social context of sex work in Addis Ababa revealed how sex workers negotiate relationships with family members, relatives, clients, roommates, and neighbors while engaged in commercial sex. The study argued that sex workers are not social outcasts, but are embedded within the same moral and social environment as others, often entering sex work due to severe economic hardship while still trying to preserve social ties. The average age of sex workers was 23 years old in 2004.

In a March 1978 interview the mayor of Addis Ababa, Alemu Abebe, claimed that there were around 100,000 prostitutes in the city. In 2015, Ethiopian scriptwriter and film director, Hermon Hailay, directed the film Price of Love, which was inspired by her experiences growing up close to prostitutes.

In 1973–1974, Dr. Dirasse counted 14,789 bars in Addis Ababa with likely almost 30,000 prostitutes. Additionally, another 35,000 to 45,000 prostitutes were said to operate independently. In total there were 80,000 women in Addis Ababa working as prostitutes. Prostitution in the Ethiopian capital was described to have been more widespread than anywhere else in Africa.

== Demographics ==
According to Ethiopian scholar Teshale Tibebu, 96% of the prostitutes in Addis Ababa belonged to the Ethiopian Orthodox Christian faith, while 2.5% were Muslim, whereas the remaining 1.5% were Catholic or Protestant. In a country where nearly half of the population is Muslim, he mentions it is surprising that almost all the prostitutes in the capital were Ethiopian Orthodox Christians. He further classified the ethnic backgrounds the prostitutes reported: 60.5% Amhara, 19% Oromo, 10% Tigrayan, and 3.5% Eritrean.

== Personal experiences ==
Rural women migrating to Addis Ababa are often exposed to economic insecurity and limited employment opportunities, which can eventually lead to sex work. Bizunesh, a 19-year-old girl, moved to Addis Ababa as a child with hopes of returning to school and joining her sister. After arriving, she worked in domestic service and a coffee house before entering sex work, initially in a bar. Following a dispute with an employer, she later worked in a massage parlour and eventually transitioned to street-based sex work during the COVID-19 pandemic. She was interviewed in June 2022 and explained her situation as follows:

"I've been through a lot considering my age, and so I know there is not much else to do in this city other than this work. Corona made everything worse, and because I already spent time on the street long ago I decided I will pay my rent no matter what. This work put a roof over my head and feeds my children. My family back home are waiting for me to support them. I suffer through this job because there is nothing else I can do. We stand on the street and sell our bodies because we have no other work and not because something changed in our humanity. The way people see us is bad because they think we are less than they are. They see us as lower, and they show it with their eyes, and their words, and their behaviour."

Ethiopian women who are deported or forced to return from Gulf States often face limited reintegration opportunities in Ethiopia, with few viable options for stable income in their home regions, leading many to relocate to the capital Addis Ababa. For women like Almaz, a 26-year-old deported from Saudi Arabia in 2014, moving to Addis Ababa after returning to Wollo in northern Ethiopia was seen as the only viable option to secure economic independence for herself and her child, where she later entered sex work. In a 2022 interview, she described her experience as follows:

"I followed a friend here who said she was working as a waitress. When I arrived, I learned it was a massage house. I refused. I tried to find work somewhere in a restaurant. After a few weeks, I heard from a broker through a friend who got me a job in a bar. And, from there I decided to move to the street. There were little options then, and there are less now. I'm not going to be a maid here, or work on a construction site to live from hand to mouth. This is the only way to make real money in this city to survive, especially with the cost of living now."

A 2021 Reuters report stated that the COVID-19 pandemic forced many Ethiopian women returning from Gulf countries into prostitution after losing their jobs abroad. Citing local charities and government data, it reported that more than 15,000 women had returned to Ethiopia since April 2020, with many remaining in Addis Ababa because they were unable or unwilling to return home empty-handed. The report also noted that local organizations observed an increase in prostitution among returnee women. Yemisrach, one such woman, said:

"I just want to get out of this dirty job.. It does more harm than good, I'm staying with the job because I don't have other alternatives."

Yenenesh Tilahun, a former migrant worker who runs a beauty salon near Addis Ababa's red-light district, said she had observed a sharp increase in the number of sex workers since the COVID-19 pandemic, adding that many of the women told her they had previously worked abroad:

"It has increased so much. There are no rooms left to rent. Most women stand on the asphalt road. These days, Arab countries are closing their doors, these women have no alternative to sustain themselves when they come back other than entering sex work."

Study participants who engaged in street-based sex work reported earning around 400-700 birr or $7–12 (in 2022) per client, with most seeing one or two clients per night. Many said earnings had become increasingly difficult due to rising living costs and greater competition. As described by Senait, a 23-year-old streetworker:

"Some days I have no one, some days I'll have one [client] or if I am lucky, two [clients] a night. But when I started this work it was much better because it was a daily guarantee. These days I worry, and sometimes, I don't know what to do. Everyone is counting their cents and there are more of us. It's a struggle, what can I tell you."

Clashes with other street workers, including shoe shiners and street vendors, were reported to be increasingly common as sex workers spent longer hours on the streets in an attempt to increase earnings. However, participants identified client aggression as the most serious challenge in their daily lives. Senait described it as such:

"It's how they are. Men release everything on us because they cannot do that to their wives. They think because I am standing here negotiating my pride that I will not fight back, but there is no one to protect me but the Almighty himself. The last guy who tried to rape me I fought back and now he has to live with a scar on his face from me. He tried to find me the next day and the day after. At first I hid, but I became scared after that so I starting working in another neighbourhood."

Participants reported experiences of clients removing condoms without consent, coercing unprotected sex, or requesting sexual practices they would not otherwise agree to. These incidents were described as undermining women's sense of safety and bodily integrity. Some participants noted that unprotected sex was sometimes negotiated in exchange for higher payments, despite awareness of risks such as HIV, as described by Senait:

"One old foreigner paid me 2,000 birr ($35) for it without protection and for doing it the perverted way. I thought to myself, who am I to decide what is done to me when I am poor? My dignity was taken, and I felt dirtier after that than after anything before it. I was sick for days, and my soul was not well, because I agreed to it. But I cannot tell you it was the last time because I am still standing here doing this work today."

The economic deprivation women experience in daily life, can lead to exchanges of sex for material support. Zenebech, a 22-year-old mother explained:

"The man who helps me, he has a desire for things, which are not bad, and so when he wants my body I don't fight him. He is a generous man, although I don't see him so often lately. He is a taxi driver so he doesn't earn a lot as well but his pity for me makes him generous. I give him what he asks for. He doesn't hurt me."

However Zenebech did not consider these sexual exchanges as work and distinguished herself from other sex workers, including streetwalkers. She emphasized that she did not rely on sex as a means of income and did not identify as a sex worker, framing these encounters as situational responses to hardship rather than structured employment. She linked this distinction to perceptions of sex work as a deliberate and immoral choice rather than one driven by lack of alternatives:

"Sex workers are good-for-nothing. There are girls who arrive here from the rural areas and are standing on a street corner the next day. That is the intention with which they arrived and that is not my business."

Feven, a 24-year-old woman who was still nursing her daughter, described her practice as follows:

"It's not easy doing this work with a child, but it is for her that I stand here every night. She still relies on my milk so I cannot leave her somewhere all night. When I find a client one of my sisters here takes her until I am back."

Haymanot, a 19-year-old woman, earned a living through begging and, at times, exchanged sex for food, clothing, and other basic necessities for herself and her child. She described her experience as follows:

"I stopped having milk for the child and so I would beg for food for her. Then one shop owner, from another area where I used to beg, said if I give him what he wants he will give me bread every day. And so, I did for some time, and he kept his word. And, he gave me powdered milk for her. And then, a pair of shoes and some clothes for the child too. And, when I was sick he found medication for me. So what, a man saw that I was poor and that I have no one. Who am I to say no to a good heart?"

With many rural women aspiring to migrate abroad, shared experiences among street-based sex workers helped shape future plans and ambitions in the city. As study participants followed similar livelihood trajectories, migration abroad was often seen as the only way to achieve the transformative goals that had initially brought many to the capital city, as explained by Tizita, a 21-year-old sex worker:

"This place has failed us. Nothing here for us but misery. This work is the only way to make real money and so we suffer through it. And I dream about Dubai for my future away from here. This is just a temporary thing. Once I save enough money I am out of here."

Reporting sexual violence by clients to authorities was often seen as unlikely to result in action, as street-based sex work is perceived as a voluntary activity involving higher risk. Key informants confirmed this, as explained by Tizita:

"Rape is part of this job. That's why I hate men. They think I don't have to agree because to them a woman who stands on the street is a thing. How would they think if they saw their daughter or sister here? But I am like any mother or wife or girl child."

Study participants reported that many clients were civil servants, including police officers, who were often described as intimidating and disrespectful. Worknesh, a 19-year-old mother of one, attributed this behaviour to the abuse of institutional power and the social status associated with state authority, combined with limited accountability for misconduct:

"With some of the policemen, it's bad because they feel higher than the law and they know they are important and they control whether I am a free woman or not. They are always so drunk and they want me to drink with them, they pay the least, and I have to argue with them even for the amount we agreed on, and then they threaten me saying they will find me tomorrow and beat me if I don't do what they want."

== History ==
Prostitution in Ethiopia has been practiced since at least the Medieval period. According to Richard Pankhurst, the first recorded mention of prostitution in Ethiopia comes from the Portuguese traveler Francisco Alvares, who visited the court of Emperor Lebna Dengel. In his description of the imperial camp, he noted the presence of tents belonging to prostitutes, whom they called Amaritas. Prostitution continued to be practiced during the Gondarine period. The chronicle of Emperor Iyasu I contains a reference to a galämota (prostitute), making it the first reference to prostitution in Ethiopian historical literature. Later in the 19th century, European travelers reported that prostitution was common in the Gondarine capital. Edmond Combes and Maurice Tamisier described it as "a town of pleasures" where courtesans abounded, while Ferret and Galinier observed that prostitutes were not socially despised and were regarded with a degree of respect. Prostitution was documented not only at Gondar but also at Adwa and Dabra Tabor, which Tamisier described as a town of joy. Antonio Cecchi also wrote of prostitutes in various parts of the country and, echoing earlier observers, remarked that they were not despised as in Europe. The French scientific mission of the 1840s also recorded the Amharic term zemut (prostitution) in its vocabulary, and the French linguist Antoine d'Abbadie listed five different terms used for a prostitute in his Amharic dictionary, the word for "prostitute" in the Tigrinya and Oromo languages was borrowed from the Amharic language. However, prostitution was not viewed in a positive light by everyone in Ethiopia, Emperor Tewodros II was quoted in an Ethiopian chronicle as expressing disgust with the monks and clerics, who were reputed to "live in the city" with prostitutes, the Protestant missionary Henry Stern also complained that most of the merchants and clerics at Gondar lived in undisguised adultery. British Consul Plowden believed that the degrading system of prostitution was "unknown" to the Ethiopians before the arrival of the Portuguese.

In Oromo society, prostitution was associated with women who had fallen out of marriage, referred to as gursuma or gursumeti, terms that were also used to denote widows or women abandoned by their husbands. In the 19th century, linguistic sources show differing interpretations, Karl Tutschek equated gurzumedi with a widow or abandoned wife, while Krapf translated gursuma as a whore or prostitute. Later dictionaries continued this ambiguity, with some defining gursumeti as widow and others as a prostitute. The Amharic term galamota (prostitute) was also adopted in later usage. British traveller Richard Burton noted in 1856 that the Harari language used the term gubnit for a whore, borrowed from the Oromo language.

The founding of Addis Ababa in the 1880s and its rapid growth in the late 19th and early 20th centuries was followed by a notable increase in prostitution. Kurt Herzbruch, who visited the city in 1907, described many "places of lust" and "houses of joy," these early establishments were made up of huts with women sitting at the entrance, sometimes singing with musical accompaniment. This growth was linked to the spread of cheap taj drinking houses, which appeared in the early 1900s. There were about fifty in 1908, and by 1929 they had increased to over a thousand in the capital. These establishments became widespread in Addis Ababa and were closely associated with prostitution. During this period, the Arabic term sharmuta was also adopted into Amharic and came to be widely used to denote prostitutes. The French linguist Marcel Cohen believed it to have been introduced and popularised through Arab and Harari merchant who were described as clients of these prostitutes.

Prostitution in Addis Ababa increased significantly in the decade preceding the Italian invasion. In 1928, Ethiopian intellectual Mahatama Warq Esete urged the government to regulate prostitution, the publication of his letter prompted Addison Southard to report that brothels had become widespread in the capital. By 1933, a night curfew required Ethiopians wishing to visit brothels to do so before dusk. Brothels were identified by red cross symbols displayed outside their entrances, though the government later prohibited the use of the symbol in Addis Ababa. Carlton Coon recounted that when a Scandinavian mission first arrived in Addis Ababa and displayed a Red Cross flag outside its clinic, the building was soon filled with puzzled Ethiopians who had mistaken it for a brothel. In 1935, Evelyn Waugh described the capital's brothels as small, single-room cabins occupied by prostitutes and their children, and noted that the former red cross signs had been removed, the standard fee for his own visit was one thaler. He also recorded that a Russian entrepreneur had opened a brothel and several night clubs in Addis Ababa before the Italian invasion. By the 1930s, prostitution was commonly referred to as zemut, while prostitutes were known as sharmuta. Contemporary travelers also reported encountering prostitutes outside Addis Ababa, French scholar Michel Leiris recorded that in 1934, while traveling on the road to Gondär, he was approached by a prostitute carrying a baby on her back who offered him her services, he also mentioned meeting another prostitute elsewhere in Tigray. Pre-war Ethiopian prostitution remained only partially commercialized and often involved a degree of courtship between the prostitute and her clients.

The Italian invasion of Ethiopia had a significant impact on prostitution in the country. Early fascist propaganda promoted erotic and semi-erotic images of Ethiopian women and supported the popularization of the song Faccetta Nera. As Italian forces advanced during the 1935-36 campaign, demand for prostitution increased sharply, with officers and soldiers openly acknowledging the need for sexual services in occupied areas. Women from Adwa and Aksum were recruited into military camps, where they were subjected to medical supervision. Compulsory treatment was introduced for women reported to have venereal diseases, while those found to be healthy were issued certificates and required to live in designated houses, where they were subject to regular inspections. After the Italian occupation of Mekelle, the town developed a significant prostitution district. A British reporter who visited a year later described an "amusement quarter" made up of more than 200 native huts, housing hundreds of women and patrolled by Italian police. Prostitution expanded rapidly in occupied towns, particularly Addis Ababa, where brothels became widespread under Italian rule. Ladislas Sava, a Hungarian physician in the city, later recalled that immediately after the occupation of the capital, several houses were converted into brothels within the first days, with many more following, reportedly under the supervision of an Italian commander. He also described the forced transfer of local women to such establishments, most often carried out with violence. Anti-fascist Italian sources denounced widespread sexual exploitation of Ethiopian women by soldiers during the occupation. The number of prostitutes in Addis Ababa soon reached significant levels. Contemporary accounts estimate that approximately 1,500 women, each occupying a separate house, were reserved exclusively for Italian nationals. These figures did not include numerous street prostitutes, who were officially required to hold permits and were expected to undergo medical examinations three times a week. Clandestine prostitution is also described as having been widespread. An Italian air force officer wrote in his diary that a motor driver from Palma had a native prostitute living in his courtyard. The importance of prostitution during the Fascist period is further illustrated by an Italian anti-fascist open letter to Mussolini, which denounced that Attilio Teruzzi, Minister of Italian East-Africa, during an official visit to Addis Ababa, had engaged the services of "the most vulgar prostitutes" from the city's brothels while staying at the Villa Italia. According to Richard Pankhurst, the arrival of the Italians, including hundreds of thousands of soldiers and workers, marked the beginning of an era of extensive and highly developed prostitution. He argues that this development left a lasting legacy in Addis Ababa and other Ethiopian towns, which continued into the 1970s.

== Sex trafficking ==
Ethiopia is a source and, to a lesser extent, destination and transit country for women and children subjected to sex trafficking. Saudi Arabia remains the primary destination for irregular migrants; reportedly, over 400,000 Ethiopians reside there. Saudi officials regularly deport Ethiopians in large numbers, and many of the deportees reported instances of sexual exploitation. Ethiopian women who migrate for work or flee abusive employers in the Middle East are also vulnerable to sex trafficking. An international organization assesses that most traffickers are small local operators, often from the victims' own communities, but that well-organized crime groups are also responsible for irregular migrants becoming highly susceptible to trafficking. Labor recruiters target young people from Ethiopia's vast rural areas with promises of a better life. Although reports remain anecdotal, the severe drought in 2015-2016 may have resulted in an increase in internal trafficking. Girls from Ethiopia's impoverished rural areas are exploited in commercial sex within the country. Addis Ababa's central market is the site of numerous brothels, where some young girls are exploited in commercial sex. Ethiopian girls are exploited in commercial sex in neighbouring African countries, particularly Sudan. Child sex tourism continues to be a problem in major hubs, including Addis Ababa, Bahir Dar, Hawassa, and Bishoftu; reports identify mostly Ethiopian-born perpetrators, including members of the diaspora, with known links to local hotels, brokers, and taxi drivers.

In 2016, federal and regional justice officials investigated 1,392 potential trafficking cases and convicted 640 traffickers under the 2015 anti-trafficking law, a significant increase from 69 convictions in 2015.

The United States Department of State Office to Monitor and Combat Trafficking in Persons ranks Ethiopia as a 'Tier 2' country.
