= Sayat Demissie =

Ethiopian singer and actress (born 1980)

- Born: 1980 (age 45–46); Addis Ababa, Ethiopia
- Occupations: Actress; singer; former beauty pageant contestant
- Years active: 2006–present
- Musical career
- Origin: Addis Ababa, Ethiopia
- Genres: Ethiopian music; pop
- Instrument: Vocals

Sayat Demissie (Amharic: ሳያት ደምሴ; born 1980) is an Ethiopian singer and actress. She debuted as a model at age 15, placing her in the top 20 in the 2004 Ethiopian Beauty Queens. She began acting in the film Sara (2006). Sayat released her debut album in 2011 and has acted in a number of movies and television series since. She returned to music with a critically acclaimed music video for her song "Eskesher" in 2019.

== Early life ==
Sayat Demissie was born in 1986 in Addis Ababa, Ethiopia. She is the last of four children in the family. In 2006, she completed high school.

== Career ==
Sayat began her modeling career at age 17. She placed in the top 20 in the 2004 Ethiopian Beauty Queens. Sayat entered the film industry in 2006 film Sara while working with Tilahun Zewege. She acted in films such as Laundry Boy, Selanchi (2009), Adamt (2013) and German film Der weiße Äthiopier (2015). Afterwards, Sayat began a musical career after releasing her album Kifel Sost Volume 1, containing her hit "Tew Maneh". In 2009, she released "Hasabun Mesrek". After a hiatus, Sayat released a comeback track titled "Eskesher" on 1 November 2019. The song recapitulates her musical career; reflecting on the hardships of life. In 2021, Sayat joined musicians like Fikiraddis Nekatibeb, Zeritu Kebede, Lij Michael, Kuku Sebsebe, and released a single "Yehager Kasma". From 2021 to 2022, she played as Enana on television drama series Eregnaye. In 2022, the show was recognized by both the Guma and Leza Awards broadcast on ARTS TV.

== Personal life ==
Sayat is a vocal supporter of women's rights. She has spoken openly about the lack of safety for women, as well as the importance of women supporting other women. In her interviews she has opened up about how much hard work and versatility her work requires and the need for self acceptance. In a February 2020 interview with Rakeb and Hanna on EBS Show, she spoke about the passion she puts into her music, and her collaboration with her sister for her symbolic music video for "Eskesher"

== Selected discography ==
Albums

Title	Date/year
Kifel Sost (Volume 1)	2011

Singles

Title	Date/year
"Tew Maneh"	2009
"Hasabun Mesrek"	2011
"Endelijinete"	2011
"Eskesher"	1 November 2019
"Yehager Kasma"	30 April 2021

== Filmography ==
Title	Year
Sara	2006
Selanchi	2009
Laundary Boy	2010
Yebirhan Firma	2014
Simet Weys Silet	2015
Higawi Gabicha	2017

== Television ==
Title	Year
Eregnaye	2021–2022
