= AIFF =

AIFF may refer to:

== Film festivals ==
- Addis International Film Festival, Addis Ababa, Ethiopia
- Alexandria International Film Festival, Alexandria, Egypt
- Anchorage International Film Festival, Anchorage, Alaska, US
- Arlington International Film Festival
- Atlantic International Film Festival, Halifax, Nova Scotia, Canada

== Other uses ==
- Audio Interchange File Format
- All India Football Federation, the national governing body of association football in India
