= Gumma Film Awards =

Ethiopian domestic film award

- Location: Addis Ababa, Ethiopia
- First award: 2014
- Website: Official website

Television/radio coverage
- Network: Varied from television stations

The Gumma Film Awards (Amharic: ጉማ የፊልም ሽልማት, romanized: guma yefīlimi shilimati) is an Ethiopian domestic film award held in Addis Ababa annually since 2014. Created by film director Yonas Berhene Mewa, the award programme broadcast through some television stations. Gumma rewards acclaimed domestic Ethiopian films.

== Overview ==
The Gumma Film Awards was created by director Yonas Berhene Mewa, the founder and owner of Ethio Films Production, believing to promote Ethiopian culture within the film industry in 2014. According to organizers, Gumma would envisaged to bring Ethiopian film industry into world standard. Gumma presents reward for best cinema achievements in Ethiopian film industry and determined by professionals.

== Notable events ==
On 17 February 2012, 23 movies made so far nominated in 17 different categories.

Note: numbers in bracket "()" denote how many times that they nominated. Source from Etmdb.

=== 1st Gumma Award ===
- Best Film of the Year: Zemen
- Best Actress Hana Yohannes

=== 3rd Gumma Award ===
- Best Film of the Year: Keletat and Yewededu Semon
- Best Actors: Etsehiwot Abebe and Adisalem Getaneh

=== 4th Gumma Award ===
- Best Film of the Year: Herol, Meba, Utopia, Wefe Komech, Yenegen Alwedim, and Yimechesh Yarada Lij 2
- Best Actors: Kidist Yilma (2) and Eyob Dawit

=== 5th Gumma Award ===
- Best Film of the Year: Atse Mandela, Taza (5), Toxidow, Yabedech Yarada Lij 3 and Ye'egzier Dildey
- Best Actors: Amanuel Habtamu, Kidist Yilma, Zeritu Kebede (2), Mulualem Tadesse, Selam Tesfaye and Tseganesh Hailu

=== 8th Gumma Award ===
In 8th Gumma Film Award edition, Mensur Jamal, Beshatu Tolemariam, Hana Yohannes, Meseret Mebrate, Girum Ermias and Saron Ayelign presented as special guests. Sayat Demissie expected to attend but withdrew earlier before the programme commenced.
