= Eregnaye =

Ethiopian television drama series

- Genre: Drama
- Written by: Azeb Worku; Beza Hailu; Kidist Yilma
- Directed by: Kidist Yilma
- Starring: Fikreyesus Zewde; Solomon Bogale; Mulalem Tadesse; Sayat Demissie; Dirbwork Seifu
- Country of origin: Ethiopia
- Original language: Amharic
- No. of seasons: 4
- No. of episodes: 48

Production
- Producer: Kidist Yilma
- Running time: 30–40 minutes
- Production company: Emahizee Pictures

Original release
- Network: ARTS TV
- Release: 7 June 2021 – 19 August 2022

Eregnaye (Amharic: እረኛዬ, translated as My Shepherd) is an Ethiopian television drama series written by Azeb Worku, Beza Hailu and Kidist Yilma, with the latter produced it. It premiered on 7 June 2021 on ARTS TV and concluded on 19 August 2022 with 4 season and 48 episodes. Starring Hailemelekot Mewael, Fikreyesus Zewde, Solomon Bogale, Mulalem Tadesse, Sayat Demissie Abebe Balcha, Amanuel Habtamu and Dirbwork Seifu, the story revolves on the rural Ethiopian culture and emphasizes about social norms in a one single utopian community. The community mutual relationship is later eroded by one greedy company who wants to grab their land and corrupt their culture.

Aba Sahilu plays a respected elder who tries to maintain the societal welfare and the other roles trapped in complicated lives in the latter part.

== Development and premise ==
Eregnaye was written by prominent filmmakers Azeb Worku, Beza Hailu and Kidist Yilma, produced by the latter. The drama strongly associated with cultural background of Ethiopia—represented by dressing, jewelry and apparatuses—are masterpiece for artistic conception. There are also greetings, invitations, wedding ceremonies, religious traditions, mourns and poetry resembling old-fashioned Ethiopian culture.

Eregnaye also drawn concept to political context reflecting the ongoing situation of the country. The series intended to demonstrate the societal life through different obstacles (loss or gain, living together, compromise and diversity).

== Plot ==
The drama setting is based on rural villages wherein mutually benefited people live together. Soon after, their relationship became spoil filled with rivalry one another regarding the land due to wealth accommodations. An investor wants to grab land of these safe pacific people whose culture is drawn in cooperative and longtime culture and tradition.

The residents of Abnet village are struggling to preserve their culture and identity with their farming ability. Aba Bekalu, one of the respected leaders among the residents, is a very generous and patriotic person who wants cooperation and protection of the ingroup. In response, the society opened a school.

One day, Aba Bekalu's daughter Wegayehu premaritally gave birth a few days before her grand wedding and Aba Bekalu died suddenly after hearing that news. This caused great turmoil and grief among the residents, and Wegayehu moved to a far region to avoid blame from the residents. Wegayehu feels responsible for violating the social norms. This violation could be compensated by his grandson named Dawit and a shepherd named Enana.

== Casts and characters ==
- Fikreyesus Zewde as Aba Sahilu – a resident elder who wants to preserve Abnet village's welfare.
- Solomon Bogale as Dawit – a grandson of Aba Bekalu who courageously undermines a powerful group and creates enemies for himself.
- Mulalem Tadesse as Wegayehu – a woman captured and haunted by her past.
- Sayat Demissie as Enana – a shepherd whose tragic life gives happiness to all.
- Dirbwork Seifu as Emama – a woman who manages her family and her neighbourhood with a very skillful and wise manner.

=== Supporting roles ===
- Kurabachew Deneke as Tasew
- Asrat Dejene as Welansa
- Meaza Takele as Masresha
- Kalkidan Tibebu as Atsede

== Awards ==
Eregnaye won the 2022 Guma Awards for Best Television Script and Best Television Drama Series. It also won the Best Drama Award at the 12th edition of Leza Awards on 25 May 2022. It also recently won the best series Award at the African Impact Awards held in Washington Dc.
