= Meseret =

Meseret (Amharic: መሰረት) is a female or male given name of Ethiopian origin that may refer to:

- Meseret Defar (born 1983), Ethiopian long-distance runner and two-time Olympic champion
- Meseret Hailu (born 1990), Ethiopian long-distance runner and world half marathon champion
- Meseret Mebrate, Ethiopian actress
- Meseret Mengistu (born 1990), Ethiopian long-distance runner and team medallist at the 2010 IAAF World Half Marathon Championships
