= Hanan Tarik =

Ethiopian actress (born 1994)

- Born: 30 June 1994 (age 31); Olympia, Addis Ababa, Ethiopia
- Education: Addis Ababa University School Of Commerce (B.A. 2017); Abyssinia Art School (2015)
- Alma mater: Addis Ababa University
- Occupations: Actress; former beauty pageant
- Years active: 2014–present
- Height: 1.65 m (5 ft 5 in)
- Spouse: Melake Brehan (m. 2017)
- Children: 2
- Awards: Gumma Film Awards (2017)
- Website: hanantarq.com

Hanan Tarik (Amharic: ሃናን ታሪክ; sometimes spelled Tariq or Tarq; born 30 June 1994) is an Ethiopian actress and former beauty pageant. Hanan gained prominence in the 2015 television drama series Wolafen that aired every Thursday on EBS TV, where she portrayed Roza until 2017. Additionally, she debuts in the film Astaraki in the same year. Hanan led the Ethiopian film industry by the time of 2017, casting numerous romantic drama films. Hanan was a recipient of consecutive awards including the Gumma Film Awards, becoming an acclaimed actress in Ethiopia.

== Life and career ==
Hanan Tarik was born on 30 June 1994 in Adds Ababa to a Sudanese father and an Ethiopian mother. Her paternal grandma was Lebanese. Hanan's school life started in elementary school and attended here final 2 years of high school at Assai Primary and Secondary Public School from where she graduated in 2014. She won a modeling competition in high school and made small on screen work portraying herself as Arab. This work led to her to being noticed by director Ermias Tadesse and later cast in her first film. Her debut film Astaraki was released in 2015, Hanan takes a part of Muna. In the same year, she starred to the 2015 TV drama series Wolafen, being her debut in television programs. After her first appearance, Hanan professional career an actor/model propelled. The series aired on EBS TV on 17 September 2015, as she has a role of Roza. After some recognition with this series, she began acting in various films; Yewededu Semon (2015), Yefikir Kal (2015), playing the role of Sara, Lene Kalesh (2016), as a role of Haymanot – the opposite character of Abraham Belayneh, Des Sil (2017) and Arif Aychekulem (2018). Raised by her grandmother, she has credited her for influencing her love of film.

She has appeared in more than ten Ethiopian movies, worked as model and influencer for prominent brands like M.A.C., DIAGEO and other various other companies including SAS Pharmacies, Royal Foam and others, making her one of the highest paid actresses and models in Ethiopia. Hanan popularity among her audiences has continued to ascend over the years. This is augmented by her active engagement with her fun base on social media including Instagram, TikTok and Facebook on which she maintains a strong followership. In addition to her professional life, Hanan also utilizes her popularity and influence to support different social causes. She has currently signed a pro bono agreement with Studio Samuel to promote women's empowerment in Ethiopia.

== Personal life ==
Hanan married her long-time boyfriend, Melake Brehan in the spring of 2017. Hanan and Melake's wedding was set on 20 May 2017, which many fellow notable people attended. She has a son, Christian (born December 2017) in Sweden and a daughter called Lillian. It was noted that she spent most of her pregnancy in Ethiopia but decided to go to Sweden, where she has relatives to give birth due to some conflicting medical evaluations she had received while in Ethiopia. Today, she lives in Ethiopia when her family returned from Sweden.

== Filmography ==
=== Film ===
Year	Title	Role
2015	Astaraki	Muna
2015	Yewededu Semon	
2015	Zewed Weys Gofer 2	
2015	Yefikir Kal	Sara
2016	Lambadina	
2016	Lene Kalesh	Haymanot
2017	Des Sil	
2018	Arif Aychekulm	
2018	Misten Darkuat	

=== Television ===
Year	Title	Role	Notes
2015–2017	Wolafen (season 1–3)	Roza	Minor role
