= Spotted hyenas in Ethiopia =

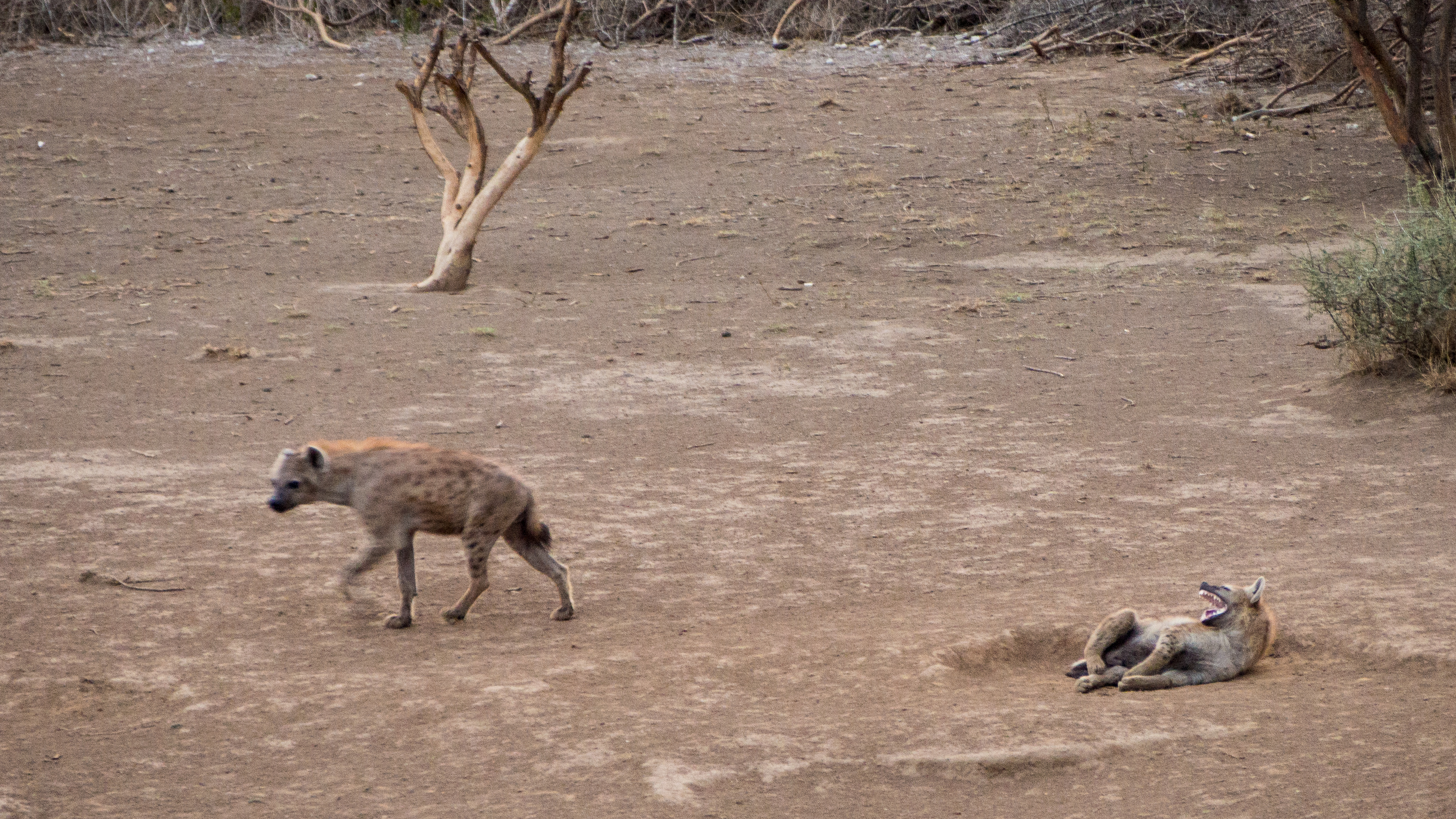
Spotted hyenas in Addis Ababa, May 2014

Spotted hyenas are widely distributed in Ethiopia specifically in the eastern parts like Harar and Somali Region. They also dwell in urban areas like Addis Ababa where they have been estimated at about a thousand and scavenge rubbish substances and feral dogs and cats. Scavenging on remains is a common feature of spotted hyenas that focus around waste material and also corpses.

Hyenas are also known for preying on domestic animals and livestock that can cause economic loss to farmers. For example, sheep are the most common prey for hyenas constituting 37.4% followed by goats, cattle, chicken and donkey. Hyena attacks on humans are also reported, most people were killed during nighttime and most of the victims were homeless. Many hyenas extensively fed on human corpses during the 1960 coup d'état and the Red Terror.

== Description ==
In recent time, spotted hyenas spawn to urban areas of Ethiopia, while they adapted human interaction. In Addis Ababa, hyenas prominently feature in urban wildlife with harmony. Indeed, they are reputable for killing and scavenging domestic livestock, primarily cattle, sheep, and goats but also poultry, cats, dogs, horses, donkeys, and camels. Hyenas are opportunistic scavenger of human waste, bones, and dung and may forage on anthrax-infested carcasses without detrimental consequences. They can eat entire body of prey except hair and hooves. The ecology of spotted hyenas are examined using different sampling techniques especially in livestock welfare. In northern Ethiopia, hyenas are regarded as important for consuming waste materials. About 82% waste material in Mekelle are deposed at dumping site, 76–83% are organic waste that is important for hyenas and jackal. Abandoned slaughter cattles left outside and easily accessible to hyenas. Hyenas observed in Mekelle are over 40 non-consecutive nights (with a mean of 1.14 nights between observation nights, and a range of zero to seven nights) between mid-June and mid-August 2019.

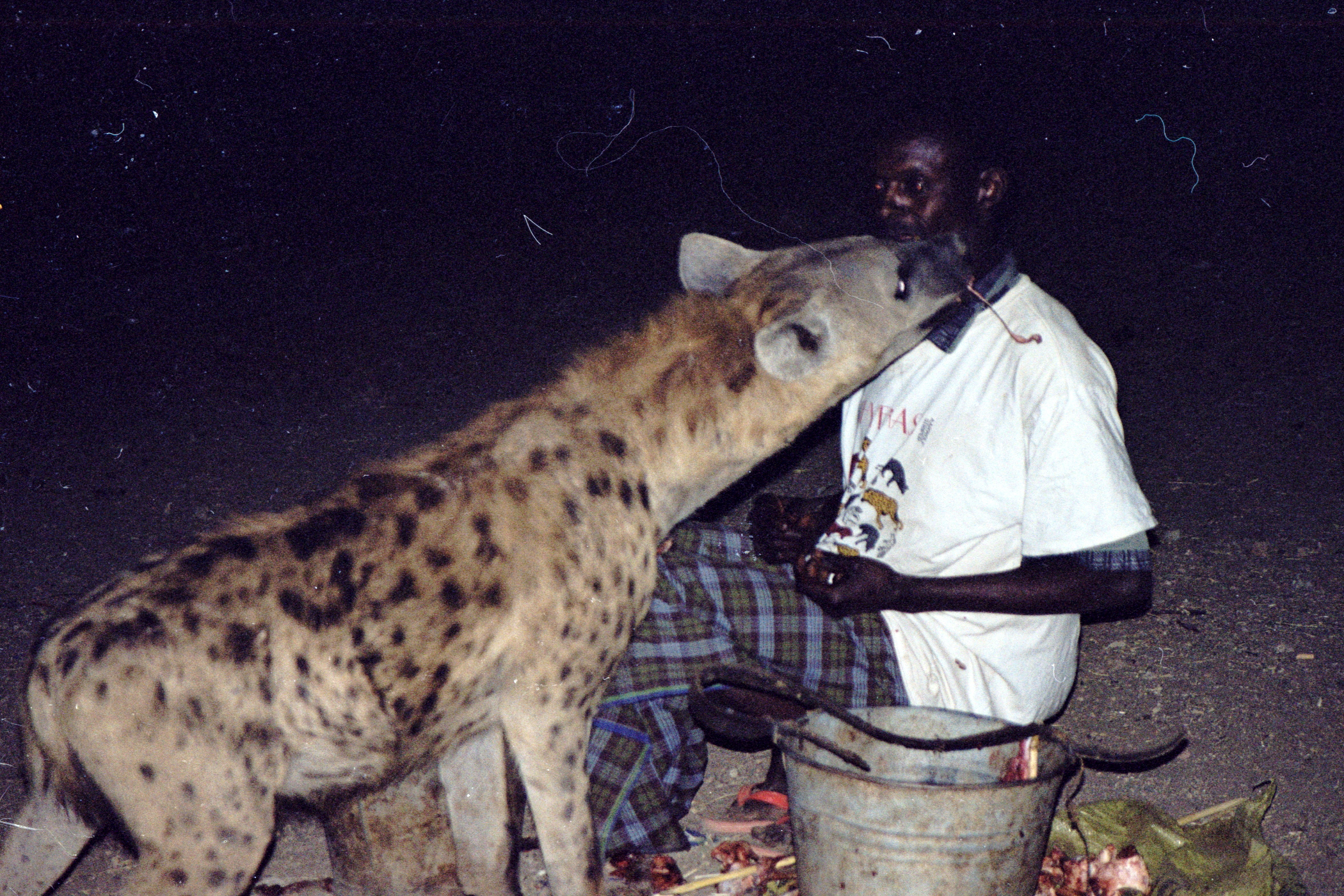
A man feeding meat to a hyena in Harar

Spotted hyenas are also widely available in Gambella National Park with good condition. In eastern Ethiopia, hyenas are adaptable to humans with high abundance. For example, hyenas are familiar in Harari and Haramaya woreda. 85 spotted hyenas were available from four woredas: Tinike numbering 22, Finkile (19), Bocheke (16), and Kerensa (28). Hyenas are broadly presented in Harar which historically tied at least 500 years according to many written sources.

== Attack on humans ==
Spotted hyena attacks on humans are underreported. During 1960 coup and the Red Terror, hyenas were reported extensively fed on human corpses. In El Kere and Bare of south-eastern Ethiopia, 50 people were attacked by hyena in the year 1998/1999, of which of majority of them (35 out of 55) were children. In the same year at Fedis, located 30 km from Harari, hyena killed 3 people and injured 3 others. In 2000, 4 people were killed by hyena and 11 people killed and more than 40 were wounded in 2005/2006.

In 2010 to 2012, twelve people were killed which 58.3% were children below the age of twelve. 50% were killed where they go to toilet during evening whereas the rest of them were killed during outdoor sleep in some villages. Overall, 98% attacks are occurring at night. Furthermore, between 2011 and 2012, 24 people were also killed at night.

=== Urban hyenas ===
In Addis Ababa, there are an estimated thousand hyenas which largely scavenge in rubbish tips or attack feral dogs and cats. There are also reports of attacks on homeless people. In 2013, a hyena snatched a baby boy from his mother near the Hilton Hotel and ate him. In December 2013, a cull was organized and marksmen killed ten hyenas which had occupied wasteland near the city center. Some 40 of the animals reported seen around British Embassy fence.

== Domestic animals' vulnerability ==
Sheep are preferable prey for hyenas among domestic animals constituting 37.4%, followed by 35.4% goats and 10.47% dogs. Goats, cattle, chicken and donkey has been secondary prey of hyena which causes economic loss to livestock.

== In popular culture ==
Spotted hyenas prominently featured and influence on the Ethiopian folklore and associated with Bouda folklore. Widely believed among the Ethiopian Orthodox Church and Beta Israel, it is associated with lower castes, primarily with manual trader such as blacksmith with a power to shapeshift into hyena. According to Niall Finneran, the "idea of magical creation underpins the perception of artisans in Ethiopia and in the wider African context. In many cases these skills have been acquired originally from an elemental source of evil via the paternal lineage, rather like a Faustian pact."
