= Selam Tesfaye =

Ethiopian actress (born 1992)

- ሰላም ተስፋዬ
- Born: 17 October 1992 (age 33); Harar, Harari Region, Ethiopia
- Occupation: Actress
- Years active: 2012–present
- Spouses: Tariku Birhanu (m. 2016; ann. 2016) Amanuel Tesfaye (m. 2018; div. 2021)
- Children: 1
- Awards: Best Actress award at the 9th Addis Music Awards

Selam Tesfaye (Amharic: ሰላም ተስፋዬ; born 17 October 1992) is an Ethiopian film actress. Her roles often placed her as a leading actress in various films. As recipient of multiple awards, notably Gumma Film Awards, she is one of the most popular icon in the Ethiopian film industry.

She had the lead role in the film Crumbs, directed by Miguel Llansó, and promoted as the first Ethiopian-made science-fiction film.

== Early life ==
Selam Tesfaye was born to parents of Tigrayan ancestry in a military camp called "Tolay", in Harar, eastern Ethiopia. She moved to Humera and learnt from grade fourth to tenth there. During her relocation to Addis Ababa, she initially couldn't speak Amharic and only spoke Tigrinya. Irrespective, she couraged to speak fluently in order to act in films. She frequently stated that she "prefers to role in films" rather than to perform other artistic professions.

== Career ==
Selam entered mainstream prominence in the 2013 film Sost Maezen (English: Triangle), an international awarded action drama film. Furtherly, she took roles in many Ethiopian films, she also known for leading role in Hiwot Bedereja (2014), as a student who faces bullying by classmates. She additionally roles in romantic drama film Lik Negn (2013).

Selam also played as Sayat in 2015 science fiction film Crumbs. This film is the first sci-fi produced in Ethiopia and gained numerous accolades.

After 2016 saw her mass roles in films, which she also known by her portrayals in different romantic drama films notably, Seba Zetegn (2016) and Yimeches Yarada Lij 2 (2017). She is also known for the 2015 comedy film Tilefegn, starring with Kassahun Fesseha.

In 2017, Selam reprised to the sequel of Sost Maezen, Sost Maezen 2. In addition to that she also played in comedy films, such as Yabedech Yarada Lij 3 and Atse Mandela in that year.

== Personal life ==
Selam was in a long relationship with Amanuel Tesfaye and they got engaged and got married in 2018. They have one child. In her wedding, she offered a bachelorette party with some fellow notable people present. She currently resides with her mother in Addis Ababa. Selam Tesfaye and Amanuel Tesfaye separated in 2022.

== Awards ==
In September 2018, Selam won the Best Actress award at the 9th Addis Music Awards, for the film Yabedech Yarada Lij.

== Filmography ==
Year	Title	Role
2012	Valantine Day	
2013	Sost Maezen	Elf
2013	Lik Negn	
2013	Yefikire Fikiregna	
2014	Freedom	
2014	Hiwot Bedereja	Seble
2014	Bihones	
2014	Weyzerit Dengel	
2014	Bechis Tedebke	
2014	Martreza	Hana
2015	Crumbs	Sayat
2015	Tilefegn	Eldana
2016	Yemechesh Yarada Lij 2	Selam(herself)
2016	Beza	
2017	Kal	
2017	Sost Maezen 2	
2017	Yabedech Yarada Lij 3	Maranata
2017	Yetekelekele	Ribka
2017	YeLib QuanQua	
2017	Atse Mandela	Misrak
2018	Yemechereshaw Mishit	
2019	Ene	
2019	Balekemis	
2019	Wagaw	
2019	Dink Fikir	
2020	Addisu Arada	
2021	Ye Fikir Volks	
