= Sebastopol Cinema =

Movie theatre in Addis Ababa, Ethiopia

- Interactive map of Sebastopol Cinema
- Address: Exhibition Center, Arada subcity Addis Ababa, Ethiopia
- Coordinates: 9.008145°N 38.762478°E
- Owner: Sebastopol Entertainment PLC
- Capacity: 250 seats
- Type: Movie theatre
- Event: Film
- Screen: 10

Construction
- Opened: 2005
- Cost: 4 million birr

Sebastopol Cinema (Amharic: ሴባስቶፖል ሲነማ) is a movie theatre in Addis Ababa, Ethiopia established in 2005. It is situated near to Hol-Zee Traditional Restaurant and close to Hall 1, in Arada district. It is owned by Sebastopol Entertainment PLC, which is owned by filmmaker Theodros Teshome. Sebastopol has three screens and executively for Ethiopian films. It is also home of Addis International Film Festival. Initial construction of the theatre costed 4 million birr capital.

== Multistorey complex ==
In June 2013, Sebastopol Entertainment PLC constructed a two-tower, four storey multiplex on a 948 square meters plot has leased for 7,000,000 ETB. The multiplex has been designated by Chartered Structural Consulting Engineers PLC for 310,000 ETB. The construction costed 50 million birr. The first tower has 10 cinema screens, five of which seat 250 people, while the largest accommodate 1,000 cinema-goers. The four remaining screens will have seats between 400 and 600 people.

== See also ==
- Cinema of Ethiopia (Notable movie theatres)
