= Yirgashewa Teshome =

Ethiopian film and festival programmer (born 1984)

- Born: 20 April 1984 (age 42)
- Education: Addis Ababa University
- Occupation: Film Festival Programmer
- Organization: Ethiopian International Film Festival

Yirgashewa Teshome born 20 April 1984) is an Ethiopian writer, filmmaker, and founding director of the Ethiopian International Film Festival, an annual event taking place in Addis Ababa.

== Education ==
Teshome obtained his bachelor's degree in Economics and master's degree in Regional & Local Development Studies from Addis Ababa University. He received a certificate in Theatrical Arts from Mahider Art College, also in Addis Ababa, in 1998.

== Career ==
Teshome launched his career in 1999 as an actor, appearing as the lead in the feature film Tikure Beles. In 2001 he produced and directed his first feature film, Campus, set entirely at Addis Ababa University, about an unwanted pregnancy and its consequences. In 2002, he founded Linkage Arts Resource Center (LARC) to develop and promote Ethiopian and African films.

In 2005, under the auspices of LARC, he established the Ethiopian International Film Festival. Its acronym was initially ETHIOIFF before a change in 2018 to ERTHOPIAN. The first edition was held in November in Addis Ababa, featuring ten Ethiopian productions. The festival went on to become an annual event screening up to 100 Ethiopian, African, and international films. The festival celebrated its 20th edition in November 2025.

He is the author of two books: “Economic Evaluation of Film Industry in Ethiopia” and “A Film History in Ethiopia; from Grand Palace to Ethioffest”, both published by Lambert Publishers.

His published academic articles include: “Some Challenges and Solutions for Improving the Ethiopian Film Industry”, 2023 in Film International) and “The story of a cultural seed sown in Addis Ababa: The Ethiopian International Film Festival (Ethioffest)”, 2018 in Journal of African Media Studies.

Teshome was a jury member of the MOOV Film Festival in 2016, and In 2024, attended the 46th Moscow International Film Festival as a juror of the BRICS Film Festival—an annual event that is hosted by the rotating presidency of the BRICS countries.
