= Kezkaza Welafen =

2003 Ethiopian drama film

- Theatrical release poster
- Written by: Theodros Teshome; Ayele Eshetu
- Produced by: Theodros Teshome
- Starring: Shimeles Abera; Lulit Assefa; Other casts
- Production companies: Sebastopol Films; Teddy Studio
- Release date: 2003
- Running time: 129 minutes
- Country: Ethiopia
- Language: Amharic

Kezkaza Welafen (Amharic: ቀዝቃዛ ወላፈን, English: Cold Blaze) is a 2003 Ethiopian drama film directed by Theodros Teshome and written by Teshome along with Ayele Eshetu. Both Teshome and Eshetu wrote the story to raise awareness of HIV/AIDS in Ethiopia, especially in the role of young women and their mental health.

Set in Sidist Kilo campus of Addis Ababa University, the films story follows a highly educated young woman Selam in middle-class family whose life was ruined by a wealthy man. Against her will, he impregnated her and pressured to marry her. This dilemma shifted when a young man saved her life from the evil guy, and changed her life. The film stars with Shimeles Abera (Joro) and Lulit Assefa.

A soundtrack for the film of the same name was performed by Abinet Agonafir, and was included to his debut album Hidden Beauty (2003).

== Plot ==
The film follows a young middle class educated woman named Selam that studies at Addis Ababa University. She is surrounded by men who want to marry her. Unfortunately, a financially stable follows her, they fall in love, and impregnated her. Obliviously, this pressure is against her will, and he planned a marriage that negatively averts her future success in education. The girl finds another man (Brook) who rescued her from this person, helped her to finish her university education, finds a new job for her and provides support for her family. They developed romantic relationship and finally married.

== Casts ==
=== Main ===
- Shimelis Abera
- Lulit Assefa

=== Supporting casts ===
- Tesfu Berhane
- Aster Bedane
- Tilahun Elfineh
- Solomon Bogale
- Muluken Teshome
- Mekdes Zedwe
- Emebet W/Gebriel
- Andualem Shiferaw
- Belaynesh Amede
- Chrotaw Kelkay
- Woinishet Kebede
- Saba Teshome
- Girma Gemechu
- Haileye Tadesse
- Gossaye Tesfaye
