= Alem Cinema =

Movie theatre in Addis Ababa, Ethiopia

- አለም ሲኒማ (Amharic)
- Interactive map of Alem Cinema
- Address: Airport Road, Bole subcity, Addis Ababa; Ethiopia
- Coordinates: 8.990°N 38.784°E
- Owner: Haile and Alem International PLC
- Capacity: 700 seats
- Type: Movie theatre

Construction
- Opened: April 2004

Website
- alemcinema.com

Alem Cinema (Amharic: አለም ሲኒማ) is the first private movie theatre in Addis Ababa, Ethiopia established in 2004. It was founded and owned by Haile and Alem International PLC, a joint venture of the renowned athlete Haile Gebreselassie and his wife Alem Tilahun.

== Description ==
Alem Cinema was established in April 2004 as the first private movie theatre founded by Haile and Alem International PLC, which is run by the renowned athlete Haile Gebreselassie and his wife Alem Tilahun. The cinema has full seating capacity of 700 people. Alem Cinema is located in Bole subcity in Addis Ababa.

== See also ==
- Cinema of Ethiopia (Notable movie theatres)
