= Rophnan =

Ethiopian DJ and producer

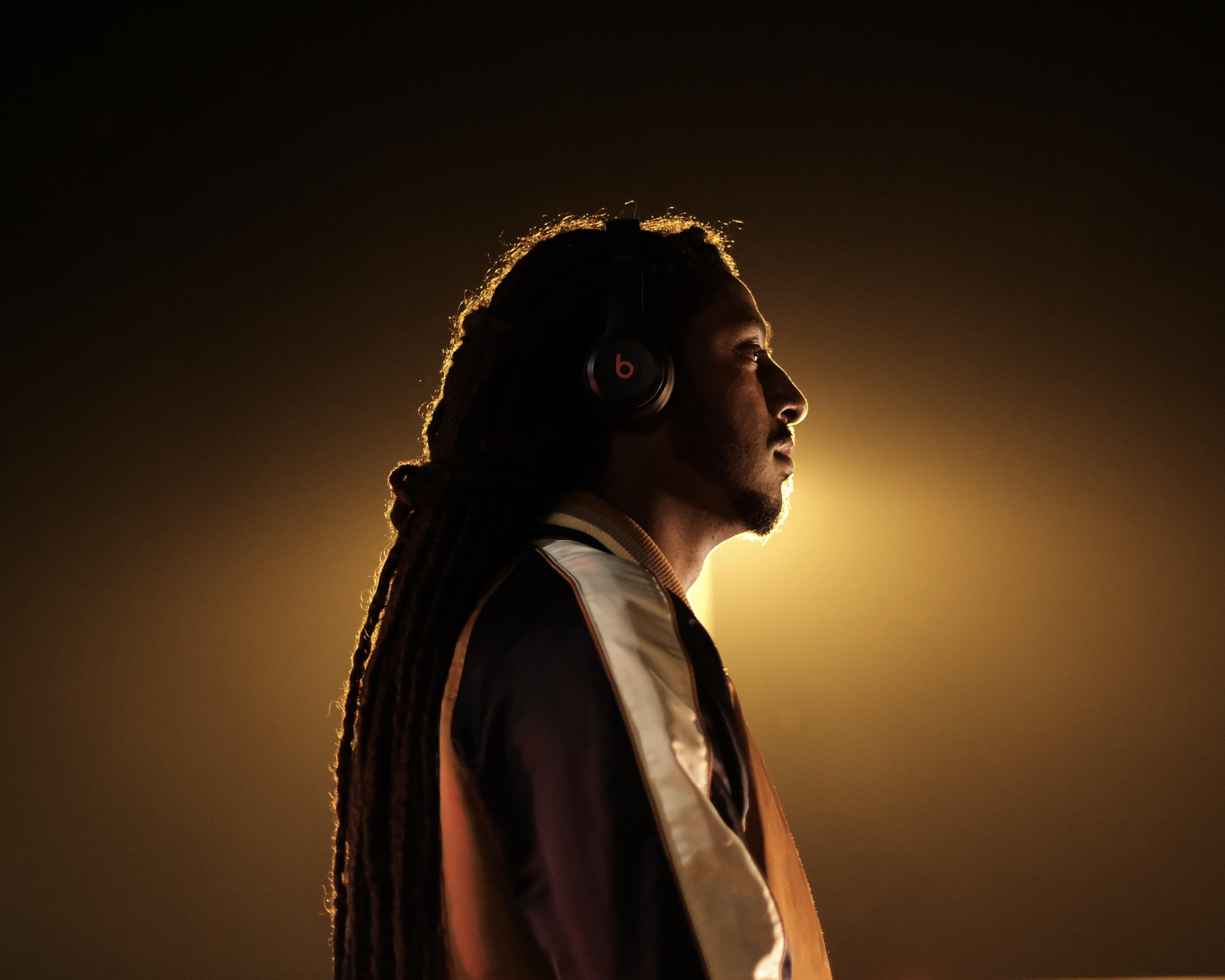
- A signature photo pose of Rophnan

Background information
- Born: Rophnan Nuri Muzeyin; 22 June 1990 (age 36); Addis Ababa, PDR Ethiopia
- Genres: Big room house; deep house; dubstep; EDM; ethnotronica
- Occupations: DJ; record producer; singer; songwriter
- Instruments: Keyboard; synthesizer; vocals
- Years active: 2006–present
- Labels: RAEY Records; Akwaaba Music; Universal

Rophnan Nuri Muzeyin (Ge'ez: ሮፍናን ኑሪ ሙዘይን; born 22 June 1990), known mononymously as Rophnan (stylized as all caps), is an Ethiopian DJ, record producer, singer, and songwriter. Rophnan entered into the mainstream recognition after his debut album Reflection, which pioneered electronic music in Ethiopia.

== Early life ==
Rophnan was born and raised in Addis Ababa. He is the ninth child out of 10 children in his family. His father named him Rophnan, not intended to be a word in any language, after having a revelation during deep prayer. When he was 10 years old, Rophnan started recording tapes in his classroom, singing and improvising drums to entertain his friends. His music style uniquely merges traditional Ethiopian instruments with contemporary electronic music.

== Career ==
=== 2006–2014: Early years ===
At 16 years old, Rophnan released his first mixtape which introduced him to Ethiopian club scene. The mixtape became an instant success, and in a market lacking local producers, DJs were playing it all across the country. The Mahmoud Ahmed's remix of the legendary song "Bemin Sebeb Litash" gained the most attention. The remix showcased Rophnan's ability to translate traditional melodies and rhymes into powerful electronic anthems.

Rophnan continued to DJ in clubs and venues in Addis Ababa while creating and developing his own sound, a fusion of Ethiopian cultural elements and his vocals.

=== 2014–2018: Career beginnings ===
In the following years, Rophnan slowly established himself as a DJ while introducing the country to EDM. He had residencies in different clubs in Addis Ababa, sometimes playing 3 shows a night. Rophnan kept his own music unreleased and made sure that the only place one could hear his tracks would be when he played them himself. One of Rophnan signature tracks, "Get To Work", a Gurage-based beat, was released this way and was played exclusively as part of Rophnan's own DJ sets, which made the song famous within Addis Ababa youth without having to release it. Rophnan played a pivotal role in the rise of electronic music and DJ culture in Ethiopia. He continued to headline more and more events packing the biggest venues.

=== 2018–2019: Reflection ===
On 17 May 2018, Rophnan released his debut album Reflection. This was the first electronic music LP to ever be released in Ethiopia. The album was released independently by RAEY Records. A shorter version of the album, named Reflection E.P. was released by the Ghanaian label Akwaaba Music. Reflection was deeply rooted in raw traditional Ethiopian music but also mixing futuristic aesthetics into the powerful songs which reflected Rophnan's generation and artistic vision. Introducing a new musical message, the album took a little while to be absorbed by the Ethiopian market, but in just a few months, the album's reach expanded from clubs, to street corners, to radio stations and finally became the most played album of the year. Respectively, Rophnan became one of the most celebrated artists in the country. The release of the album coincided with a governmental change which brought consciousness to the youth of Ethiopia, and Reflection became the soundtrack of those winds of change. Soon after the album release Rophnan has performed live in the popular Ehud Be EBS TV show where he delivered a 10-minute set of live music, becoming the first artist ever to not lip-sync on the show. The video went viral and was viewed by millions.

The album won Rophnan three 2018's Leza Awards including Album of The Year, becoming a ground breaking release for an emerging genre.

In his acceptance speech, staying true to the generation who brought him to this point in his career, Rophnan said:

Reflection is an album where I reflected myself, my country and my generation .... I want to say to my younger brothers and sisters, use the computers, internet and smartphones you have in your reach for bigger things.

2018 also saw world-famous music group Major Lazer feature the track "Get To Work" on their "Africa To The World" compilation, highlighting Rophnan's place in the forefront of contemporary African music. At the end of the 2018 Rophnan participated in Coke Studio Africa in Nairobi, where a collaboration with Zambian Rapper Chef 187 resulted in an original track named "All The Way". The powerful track and the use of ancient African instrumentation, together with cutting-edge sound design, drew positive feedback across the continent and became one of the season musical highlights.

Rophnan gained many fans (stylized as Phans) by being a representative of a new generation's creative force in Ethiopia. This gave him considerable digital following, memes, fan art and social trends. The "Rophside", a side view picture which imitated the album art and Rophnan's favorite picture pose, itself derived from the long time tradition of Ethiopian emperors and rulers posing in profile, became an internet phenomenon and trending hashtag.

At the first half of 2019 Rophnan went on the My Generation national tour, packing up stadiums across the country with his "Phans". The opening show of the tour broke the attendance record for Ghion, with massive crowds showing up, thousands beyond the venue capacity, resulting in commotion and police brutality. The tour was the first to sell tickets via electronic means.

In July 2019, Rophnan was featured on Forbes Africa's 30 under 30 list in the Creative Category, naming Rophnan as one of the continent biggest influencers that year. Rophnan is the first Ethiopian musician to be featured on the list.

=== 2021–2022: SOST and Sidist VI ===
Rophnan released a 16 minutes long three song compilation called SOST (Amharic stylized as ሦስት III) on 17 May 2021. Three singles have premiered on his YouTube page. Since its release, SOST has gained massive success in Ethiopia by getting 2 million views within just a week. On 24 December, Rophnan released a single titled "Tesfa". In June 2022, Rophnan announced contract sign with Universal Records and release of his second album, Sidist VI which was released on 11 July.

=== 2024–present: Zetegn IX and further releases ===
On 11 February 2024, Rophnan released Zetegn IX (Amharic: ዘጠኝ, (9) "nine"). Haile Roots and Sol Romeyo collaborated for the album work. His single "Shegiye" was gained viral recognition in TikTok, its music video has been attracted to over 2.8 million viewers. He followed releasing singles such as "'Dorze Delics", "Pele" and "Zetegn Nor".

== Discography ==
Studio albums

Title	Album details
Reflection	Released: 17 May 2018; Label: RAEY Records
Sost	Released: 17 May 2021
Sidist VI	Released: 11 July 2022; Label: Universal Records
Zetegn IX	Released: 11 February 2024; Label: Universal Music Africa

EPs

Title	EP details
Reflection	Released: 2018; Label: Akwaaba Music

Singles

Title	Single details
"Tesfa"	Released: 24 December 2021; Label: 4Dot Music

== Albums track listings ==
- Reflection
  1. Degime
  2. Nege Yet Yihedal
  3. Yesew Qine
  4. Drop It Again
  5. Anchin New
  6. Ade Dorze
  7. Gamo Dare
  8. Get to Work (DJ MIX)
  9. Yidres
  10. Bye Bye
  11. The Mad Sheperds
  12. Piyasa Lay
  13. Kenenise
  14. Lingersh
- Sidist VI
- Zetegn IX
