= Tamrat Desta =

Ethiopian singer and songwriter (1978–2018)

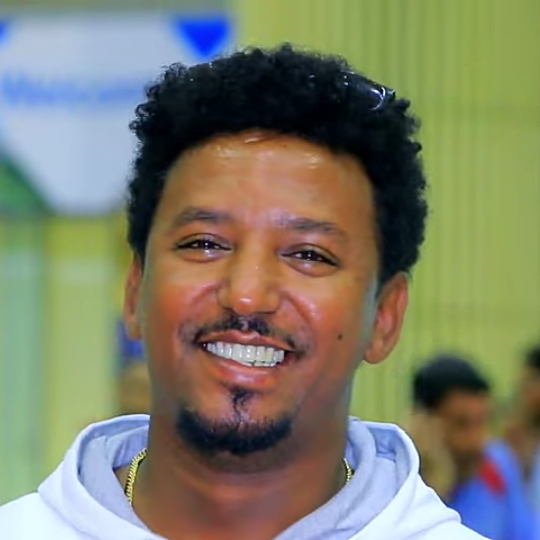
- Tamrat in 2017

Background information
- Born: 1978; Tiqur Wuha, Shewa Province, Ethiopia (near Shashemene, Oromia Region)
- Origin: Dire Dawa, Ethiopia
- Died: 18 April 2018 (aged 39–40) Addis Ababa, Ethiopia
- Genres: Ethiopian music
- Occupations: Singer; songwriter
- Instrument: Vocals
- Years active: 1998–2018
- Label: Nahom Records

Tamrat Desta (Amharic: ታምራት ደስታ; 1978 – 18 April 2018) was an Ethiopian singer and songwriter. He was best known for his two albums Anleyaym (2004) and Kanchi Ayebeltm (2008).

== Life and career ==
Tamrat Desta was born in Tiqur Wuha near Shashamane, Ethiopia in 1978. He was the second of three children, all boys. After some years in Tiqur Wuha, his family moved to Shashamene and later went to Hawassa, where Tamrat completed high school. In 1998, Tamrat moved to Dire Dawa to live with his guardian; while there, he began to perform as a singer.

In 1999, Tamrat relocated to Addis Ababa to pursue his music career. His first album, Anleyaym was released in 2004. Most of the lyrics on this CD were written by Habtamu Bogale, and the melodies of six tracks were composed by himself. Tamrat released his sophomore album Kanchi Aybeltm in 2008, reaching major achievements. In 2014, Tamrat released an album called Keza Sefer. In addition to contributing more than nine singles, he has also composed melodies for various singers Gossaye Tesfaye, Tadele Gemechu, Yerdaw Tena, Mamila and Kitchini, Meselu Fantahun, Haileyesus Feysa, Dereje Dubale, Tibebu Workiye, Tigist Woyoso, and Wondimu Jira are among the vocalists who played his melody compositions.

=== Impacts ===
His music had a significant influence, particularly on the youth of the '90s. Songs like "anileyayim", "Ayikebdim Wey" and "Lemin Yelegnim Alish" are few of his songs that have the power to evoke emotional depth and has left a lasting impact on listeners. In his song "Ende Yihuda," phrases like፡

"እንኳን ቀረ በዚሁ፤ ደግሞ ለሌላ ሃጢዓት 
ከምትሰጪያት ለበቀል፤ የልቤን ከረጢት።
ያመነን እየሳሙ፤ ለጥቅም ቢሸጡት
ገንዘቡ አኬልዳማ፤ ትርፉ የደም መሬት።

 መርጬሽ ከሰው ስልጣን ብሰጥሽ ከልቤ ጓዳ
 አንቺ ለወጥሺኝ በማይሆን ነገር እንደ ይሁዳ።"

serve as a poignant reminder of the emotional depth present in his music.

== Death ==
On 18 April 2018, Tamrat went to a local clinic in Addis Ababa for seeking medical help for tonsillitis. After receiving a pain killer, he collapsed on his way to his home and was pronounced dead at the scene. Shortly after his death, several media outlets speculated that Tamrat died of medical error and the physician who treated him was found responsible for his death.

Tamrat's funeral service was held at Holy Trinity Cathedral church in Addis Ababa on 19 April 2018 and was attended by thousands of fans and famous figures. He was the father of five children, including Dagmawi Tamrat, who later became singer.

== Discography ==
- Anleyaym (2004)
- Kanchi Aybeltm (2008)
- Keza Sefer (2014)
