= Selanchi =

2009 Ethiopian romantic drama film directed by Belay Getaneh

- Theatrical release poster
- Directed by: Belay Getaneh
- Screenplay by: Leoul Solomon; Tsegaye Yohannes; Belay Getaneh; Belay Tsegaye
- Produced by: Rediet Yeregal; Benyam Andarge
- Starring: Sayat Demissie; Leoul Solomon; Tewdros Sefraye; Fikir Tezera; Kiros Haile Selassie; Solomon Tashe
- Production company: Hanos Film Production
- Release date: June 2009
- Running time: 106 minutes
- Country: Ethiopia
- Language: Amharic

Selanchi (Amharic: ስለ አንቺ, lit. 'About You') is a 2009 Ethiopian romantic drama film. Directed by Belay Getaneh, it stars with Sayat Demissie and Leoul Solomon. The story revolves around 20 year old Wondwossen, who struggles with mental disorder and finds his love interest Fikir. Both are hindered to process their relation due to refusal of Wondwossen's father, a lieutenant general who supervises him. The film has won three awards on the 4th Ethiopian International Film Festival and it is the winner of the Best International Romantic Comedy Feature at the New York International Film Festival.

== Plot ==
Wondwossen, a 20 year old high school student, struggles with mental disorder, arising from rigorous treatment by his father that prevents him from joining social settings. His father is a lieutenant general who works in USA Blackjack Online. During his school years, he finds a girl from his neighborhood named Fikir. They seldom spend romantic periods while avoiding his father's notice. In the latter part of the story, his father knows about their engagement, but is overwhelmed when Fikir tells her tragic background and declares her honesty to Wondwossen. They are eventually united as a family.

== Awards ==
The film has won three awards at 4th Ethiopian International Film Festival and named Best International Romantic Comedy Feature at the New York International Film Festival.
