= Theodros Teshome =

Ethiopian filmmaker (born 1970)

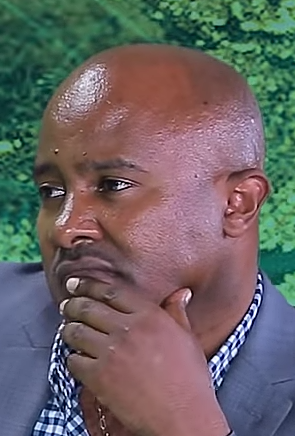
- Theodros in an interview with LTV Show (November 2018)
- Born: 7 January 1970 (age 56); Jimma, Kaffa Province, Ethiopian Empire (now Oromia Region, Ethiopia)
- Education: Addis Ababa Commercial College; Los Angeles Film School
- Occupation: Filmmaker
- Years active: 1996–present
- Notable work: Abay vs. Vegas; Kezkaza Welafegn; Triangle trilogy
- Awards: Full list

Theodros Teshome Kebede (Amharic: ቴዎድሮስ ተሾመ ከበደ; born 7 January 1970) is an Ethiopian filmmaker. Theodros is known for initiating the revival of the Ethiopian film industry in the early 2000s, and for helping to create a boom in film-making in the country. Theodros produces, directs, writes and often acts in his own films, and he has produced films that deal with social issues such as HIV, immigration, and violence against women as well as films with nationalistic content.

Theodros produced and directed two of the highest grossing Ethiopian films of all time, Abay vs. Vegas and Kezkaza Welafegn. He is the owner of Teddy Studios, one of the largest producers of films in Ethiopia, and Sebastopol Entertainment PLC (Sebastopol Cinema), which operates the biggest chain of private cinemas in Addis Ababa and other cities in Ethiopia, giving him significant control in both the production and distribution of films in the country.

== Early life ==
Theodros Teshome was born on 7 January 1969 in Jimma, Ethiopia to Teshome Kebede, a coffee and honey merchant, and Elfinesh Desta. When he was sixteen, Theodros joined the military as required for all men of that age during the Derg regime in Ethiopia, but his time in the Ethiopian Air Borne was short lived. Theodros fled the military after one year to Addis Ababa where he attended Shimelis Habte Secondary School. After graduating from college, Theodros worked as a photographer in Addis Ababa and later in Jimma.

== Career ==
Theodros became interested in film-making while he was working as a photographer. In 1996, with a start-up capital of 4000 birr ($200), Theodros established Teddy Studios in the Addis Ababa neighborhood Cherkos. He wrote, directed, edited and produced his first film Gilbet Alem (The World Upside Down) in Jimma, using a wedding camera borrowed from the shop he worked in.

Theodros made his second film in 1998, a direct to VHS release Seoul (Hell). Seoul drew the attention of MIDROC Ethiopia, and he was hired full-time to make documentaries for the company. but was later dismissed when he spent time working on his own project Kezkaza Welafegn (Cold Flame).

=== Breakthrough ===
Theodros borrowed 90,000 birr ($11,250) to make Kezkaza Welafegn, a film about the consequences of unsafe sexual practices and HIV. The film, made as a video, is Ethiopia's first ever digital film to be released in movie theatres. The film was sponsored by the Netherlands Embassy in Addis Ababa, and Kezkaza Welafegn would become the highest grossing Ethiopian film of all time (until Theodros' Abay vs. Vegas release seven years later). The film was estimated to have made 5 million birr ($625,000) domestically. The success of the film is significant in Ethiopia as it opened the door for other filmmakers in Ethiopia in movie theaters. There were no private cinemas in the country in the early 2000s and his film was one of the earliest to be shown in government-owned cinemas. The success of his film showed that his video-to-cinema model is viable in the country, leading to an increase in the number of private theatres and a change in theatrical distribution in the country. The technical quality of the work was also noted, and his use of the digital format made production easier, which led to a significant increase in film production in Ethiopia.

Theodros made a sequel to Kezkaza Welafegn called Fikir Seferd (Love's Judgement), which was released in 2005 with Theodros playing the lead character. Fikir Seferd was the second most successful film of that year, behind Semaywe Ferris (Blue Horse) by Serawit Fikre. His next film, Red Mistake, focuses on the atrocities and conflict during the Dergue Regime; however, the film proved to be a financial failure.

Theodros then wrote and produced and starred in his most successful film to date, Abay vs. Vegas, which became the highest-grossing Ethiopian film of all time. Abay vs. Vegas tells the story of a love triangle that stretches from Bahir Dahr in Ethiopia to Las Vegas, Nevada, US.

Theodros followed Abay vs. Vegas with two more films, Sost Maezen (Triangle – Going to America), which was released in July 2013, and its sequel Sost Maezen 2 (Triangle 2 – Peak of intimacy), which was released in January 2017. Sost Maezen would become his most-critically acclaimed film. It was selected as the centerpiece of the 2015 Pan African Film Festival held in Los Angeles, and was awarded the Festival Founders' Award for best narrative feature. It was also selected as the opening film of the New African Film Festival in Silver Spring, Maryland. Sost Maezen is the only film from Ethiopia to be nominated in 8 categories for the Africa Movie Academy Awards, and it won the Best Supporting Actor, Best Soundtrack, and special jury award for best narrative feature. It won the Best Audience Award at the Rwanda Film Festival.

Theodros held the position of the president of the Ethiopian Audio-Visual Producers Association.

=== Sebastopol Cinema ===
In 2005, Theodros Teshome established Sebastopol Cinema, named after the 19th century Sebastopol cannon of Emperor Tewodros, at the Exhibition Center at Meskel Square in Addis Ababa. The company now controls the largest chain of private cinemas in Ethiopia.

Grove Garden Walk

In December 2020, Theodros introduced the first privately owned garden walk in Addis Ababa. Grove Garden Walk resort and park is located inside Ghion Hotel around Meskel Square right beside the national palace.

== Endorsement ==
In September 2008, the beginning of a new millennium in Ethiopia, Theodros linked up with Teddy Afro, a popular musician known for his anti-government music, to perform in Jimma for the Millennium celebration. The next year, Teshome organized a fundraising telethon for Jimma that raised 101 million birr (pledged) ($11.2 million) for road construction projects.

== Filmography ==
- Gilbet Alem – 1996
- Seoul – 1998
- Kezkaza Welafen – 2003
- Fikir Seferd – 2005
- Red Mistake – 2006
- Abay vs.Vegas – 2011
- Sost Maezen – (Triangle: Going to America) – June 2014
- Sost Maezen 2 (Triangle 2 - Peak of Intimacy) – January 2017

== Awards and nominations ==
Year	Award	Category	Work	Result	References
2015	Pan African Film Festival	Festival Founders' Award- Narrative	Triangle: Going to America	Won	
2015	Africa Movie Academy Awards	Best Director	Triangle: Going to America	Nominated	
2015	Africa Movie Academy Awards	Best Film	Triangle: Going to America	Nominated	
2015	Africa Movie Academy Awards	Best Film in an African Language Best film special jury award	Triangle: Going to America	Nominated	
2015	Rwanda Film Festival	Audience Award	Triangle: Going to America	Won	

2024 Guma Film Award ) Best supporting actor for the film Zimitaye
