= Siryet =

2007 Ethiopian crime thriller film

- Theatrical release poster
- Directed by: Yidnekachew Shumete
- Written by: Dereje Kikiru
- Produced by: Yidnekachew Shumete
- Starring: Girum Ermias; Bertukan Befikadu; Enkusilassie Workagegnehu; Alebachew Mekonnen; Solomon Tashe; Thomas Tora; Felek Kassa; Kassahun Fisseha
- Production company: Tom Film Production
- Release date: 2007
- Running time: 110 minutes
- Country: Ethiopia
- Language: Amharic

Siryet (transl. Redemption) is a 2007 Ethiopian crime thriller film directed and produced by Yidnekachew Shumete. It was the first film produced by Yidnekachew. Written by Dereje Fikiru, the film stars Girum Ermias, Bertukan Befikadu, Enkusilassie Workagegnehu, Alebachew Mekonnen, Thomas Tora, Felek Kassa, Kassahun Fisseha and Solomon Tashe, and revolves around a charred-faced serial killer follows six individuals to take revenge on them for causing his burnt face and cut his tongue.

== Plot ==
Gaga, a charred face man, seeks Akafle (or Akakiye) for unspecified cause. Akafle's son Naty, discovers the arrival of the man and reported to his eldest brother Mesfin, who relentlessly search for Gaga's identity while he visiting their house at night.

Mesfin, later accompanied by his brother, pursues Gaga by concealing themselves from Gaga's sight. Gaga lumbers to random houses and disappeared from the brothers' sight. While the brothers seeking his trace, Gaga entered a dwelling of an elderly prostitute who demands 30 birr for a night. Gaga then proceeds showing a piece of paper that reads "Have you forgotten me?" before brutally dismembers her body and escaped through the roof. Mesfin and Naty arrived the scene, finding severed arms and limbs of the woman strained by blood.

In the next day, Mesfin opens a company working as managing director with the daughter of owner of the company, Melawit. Melawit, who is graduated from a college, works as electrician and began affairs with Mesfin. Melawit sets a dinner party on the occasion of her graduation in which Mesfin, and his brother invited in the party, though their father deprived them to go. Gaga arrived at the party. After enjoying dancing, Sharew's phone rings; while Gaga instructs him to approach in the front of window, he appeared at his back and proceeds to cut his tongue before showing "Have you forgotten me?" paper sign, and ejected from the building floor, impaled by metal bar. The murder was happened as Mesfin and Melawit talking outside a balcony.

Meanwhile, Ato Aklilu knows the phone number whom Sharew received a call. As time goes by, Melawit and Mesfin developed a romantic relationship. In order to have access, Gaga calls for Melawit and she gives to Mesfin and pointed out his location. Mesfin and Sancho arrived to Gaga's house to inspect the situation; Sancho feels dread after seeing Gaga and flee out of control. While searching Sharew's house, police found a photograph showing six apparent friends, who have turned to enemies.

Mesfin's father learns where the brothers went last night. He asked whether they are in the sight of his enemies and warned Mesfin not to meet Melawit. However, Mesfin insisted to do so. Melawit drives to unknown destination where she calls to Mesfin. Meanwhile, Gaga picked the phone and listens her conversation, informing her exact location. He then headed to her. While Melawit awaiting for Mesfin, Aklilu, who learned Mesfin is the son of his enemy, tells her not to talk him through a call. Gaga arrives to Melawit's site in the wood and searches for her while she hides inside a pit and calls to her father to save her, and successfully escaped by car. While Aklilu arrives to search Gaga, Gaga then knocked Aklilu unconscious before kidnap him. The police arrive to the scene and find only his cell phone.

Mesfin heads to Gaga's house and watches him loading Volkswagen van and then quickly returned to house to call Melawit. When he reaches to Aklilu's house, the police arrest him for interrogation. Meanwhile, Gaga deceives the police and kidnaps Melawit. Upon arriving to Gaga's house, police found Akafle's corpse hanged to the roof. Detective Menagesha tells Mesfin that his father found dead. Upon learning the death of Akafle and loss of his fiancée, Mesfin resorts to take revenge against Gaga.

Detective Menagesha brings one of his six friends who is jailed, and tells about Gaga and Akafle, Aklilu and the two murdered. In flashback, the individual narrates how Gaga attacked Sharew and Akafle, the loss of his eye, and how he and Akafle managed to escape from the police torment after held as hostages.

Mesfin fortunately traverses to the old van which Gaga boarded on taxi. He asked to the taxi driver where does he go and the driver responded they are going to old bullet store. At store, Gaga tied Aklilu's hands and legs with a chair. By tying Melawit on a board, he levered another piece of wooden board attached by nails and suspended with cord, which is held by Aklilu's bite. The board would lethally falls to Melawit if Aklilu unconstrained the cord.

Before Gaga sets the rope on fire, Mesfin intercepts and briefly engaged fights with him. As Gaga knocked out, Mesfin managed to untie Melawit and Aklilu, but Gaga revives and kills Aklilu by throwing an axe. During a short combat with Mesfin, Mesfin knocked him to the board which is Melawit restrained by, and Melawit quickly released the suspended board that sticks nails, fatally impaled him.

In the ending, Melawit and Mesfin are seen sitting in garden; Mesfin shows her a photograph of six people before the picture swiped by the wind and floats to the stream.

== Casts ==
- Girum Ermias
- Bertukan Befikadu
- Enkusilassie Workagegnehu
- Alebachew Mekonnen
- Solomon Tashe
- Thomas Tora
- Felek Kassa
- Kassahun Fisseha
