= Yewendoch Guday =

2007 Ethiopian film

- Theatrical release poster
- Directed by: Henok Ayele
- Written by: Admassu Kebede
- Starring: Admassu Kebede; Rekik Teshome; Shewit Kebede; Shewaferaw Desalegn; Michael Million; Tewodros Seyoum; Wesagn-Neh Hailu; Mesfin Haileyesus; Zerihun Asmamaw; Elsabeth Getachew; Meron Habte
- Production company: Arkey Sera Production
- Release date: 17 February 2007
- Running time: 101 minutes
- Country: Ethiopia
- Language: Amharic

Yewendoch Guday (Amharic: የወንዶች ጉዳይ, lit. 'Men's Issue') is a 2007 Ethiopian romantic comedy film directed by Henok Ayele and produced by Arkey Sera Production. Premiered on 17 February 2007, the film gained domestic accolades and large viewers in national cinemas.

Starring with Admassu Kebede and Rekik Teshome, the story revolves around principally the life of carpenter Amero, who was devastated by betrayal of his ex-girlfriend, and later encounters with future love interest Helena. During their relationship, Amero lied to her that he is a famous carpenter from the United States. Financially incapable, Amero buys a fake bracelet to please her while in the latter part she knows all of his lies and leaves him. Learning his true love and favor, Helena regrets and reunited with Amero.

== Plot ==
Amero, a renowned carpenter, lives with six workmates namely Tejo, Solomon, Qecho, Tewedros, Emushu, and Zerihun in a woodwork company under their boss Mr. Ketema. Amero's girlfriend Amy betrayed him to have an affair with another man, and together they decide to travel to the U.S. The couple arrange their wedding, with Amero and his friends invited to attend. At the wedding ceremony, Amero and his friends decide to take revenge by ruining the wedding. However, he accidentally finds his future love interest Helina with her friend named Martha. Amero lies to Helena that he is a famous carpenter who returned from the U.S. and camouflages as a fluent English speaker. Amero and Helena become romantically involved.

Amero and his friends formed men association, which originally aimed for discussing sexual activity encountered by the group, but also to snitch on Helena and Martha. Amero tried to sleep with Helena but both voluntarily ceased, as his friends recorded their intimacy on phone before the phone unexpectedly shut down, without hearing their ending. On the next day, Amero warmly received by his friends in order to tell the event from the beginning, but Amero told that he did not kiss her, leading to disappointment.

Helena and Martha began setting plot against the men group, including Amero. Amero, who is broke, buys a standard bracelet to Helena faked as the expensive one. Meanwhile, one of his friends, Tejo, attempted to steal from her, without Amero's knowledge. Helena and Martha tried unsuccessful exchange from dealer and realized that the bracelet is a counterfeit.

Helena set a revenge against Amero and invited him in a hotel. She began deliberately damaging the property, smashing mirror and beer bottle to make him lavish for the cost. Helena's nagging become severe day to day, and eventually Helena reveals she knew he had counterfeit the bracelet and he was lying to her from the beginning, and abandons him.

Distraught Amero decided to leave from his job, but reluctantly refused by his boss. For the last time, Amero asserted his decision to leave her a while, after which she regretted. In the latter part, Helena consulted the owner of woodwork, Mr Ketema, and selected Amero to design furniture inside her bedroom. At this time, she tried to seduce Amero to pay for him a bonus payment that he denied and leaves her. Angered Helena, along with Martha, follows Amero to his workplace, where she is confronted by Mr Ketema. Helena begins to violently disrupt the workplace by smashing door and assaulting Amero's friends until she faces him inside warehouse. Helena asks him to forgive her. As she grabs a piece of furniture to throw on him, both embrace each other, with his friends celebratedly singing for the couple's fond.

== Cast and characters ==
- Admasu Kebede as Amero
- Rekik Teshome as Helena
- Shewit Kebede as Martha
- Michael Million as Solomon
- Tewodros Seyoum as himself
- Zerihun Asmamaw as himself
- Wesagn-Neh Hailu as Emushu
- Mesfin Haileyesus as Tejo
- Elsabeth Getachew as Qecho
- Shewaferaw Desalegn as Mr. Ketema
- Meron Habte as Amy

== Sequel ==
In 2009, its sequel titled Yewendoch Guday 2 was released and directing, writing and acting held by Admasu Kebede, while the cast except Michael Million reprises in the sequel.
