= Who is Hirut's father? =

1965 Ethiopian drama film

- Theatrical release sketched poster. It was later digitalized.
- Directed by: Elala Ibsa
- Starring: Abebech Ejigu
- Production companies: Association of Country Film and Advertisement
- Release date: 29 August 1965
- Running time: 80 minutes
- Country: Ethiopia
- Language: Amharic

Who is Hirut's father (Amharic: ሂሩት አባቷ ማነው?) is a 1965 Ethiopian drama film directed by Elala Ibsa and produced by the Association of Country Film and Advertisement. It was released on Haile Selassie I Theatre (now called the Ethiopian National Theatre) on 29 August 1965. Starring Abebech Ejigu as Hirut, it is the first ever Ethiopian feature film and the first to use digital cinematography in later years. In the film, Hirut meets with her future husband and have a daughter. Meanwhile, her husband jailed for 15 years and left her daughter without nurturing father. This led a significant social stigma.

In 2020, the film digitized for view. On 5 January 2022, the film was premiered to viewers at Mulualem Cultural Center in Bahir Dar.

== Plot ==
The story revolves around a 1940s woman named Hirut. She finds an older man named Gugsa in Nazareth and she gradually fall in love with him. Upon their engagement, the couple have a daughter named Abeba and moved to Addis Ababa with disastrous consequence and unrequited love. Gugsa then jailed for 15 years. Accompanying her daughter, Hirut seeks for her first love and the two moved to Asmara to live best life. While in Asmara, Abeba faces ridicule by people because of losing her father and constantly asked "who the father is?" The daughter then succumbed to social stigma and tries searching a peaceful life.

== See also ==
- Cinema of Ethiopia
