= Philips-Radio =

1931 Dutch film

- Directed by: Joris Ivens
- Written by: Joris Ivens
- Cinematography: Joris Ivens; Edgar Fernhout; Mark Kolthout
- Edited by: Joris Ivens; Helen van Dongen
- Music by: Lou Lichtveld
- Production company: Philips
- Release date: 1931
- Running time: 36 minutes
- Country: Netherlands
- Language: Dutch

Philips-Radio is a 1931 Dutch documentary short film directed by Joris Ivens. Commissioned by Philips, the film served as a promotional tool to showcase the latest production processes of Philips radios in the company's facilities in Eindhoven. The cinematography, led by Ivens, captured the rhythmic interaction between machinery and factory workers, portraying the manufacturing procedures. Ivens made the decision to engage a Paris-based studio to integrate sound techniques into the film, making it the first Dutch sound film ever produced.

The film is on permanent display in the 20th-century section of the Rijksmuseum in Amsterdam.
