= Adanech Admassu =

Ethiopian filmmaker (born 1977)

- Born: 30 May 1977 (age 49); Addis Ababa, Socialist Ethiopia
- Citizenship: Ethiopian
- Education: City and Guilds of London Institute
- Occupation: Film director
- Years active: 1977 - present
- Organizations: Gem TV (1997–present); HAFA Film Production PLC (managing director)
- Awards: 24th ONE WORLD MEDIA AWARD 2012

Adanech Admassu (born 30 May 1977) is an Ethiopian filmmaker. The central axes of her work are cooperating with NGO programs in Ethiopia and addressing public health and human rights problems in Ethiopia and across Africa, with a focus on stories of girls and women. With Gem TV, she has produced many films about everyday life in the communities.

== Biography ==
=== Early life ===
Adanech Admussu was born and raised in the Mercato community in Addis Ababa, as the eldest child in a Christian family. Her father left the family during her early childhood. At the age of 16, she left school. She took care of her siblings while her mother was sick and later started selling snacks on the street of Mercato to earn wages her family.

=== Film maker ===
In 1997 she joined a training program with Gem TV, one of the first film schools in Ethiopia. That program took children from disadvantaged backgrounds to train them to become filmmakers. It is where she first got in touch with film making and was given the chance to have her own voice. She also got opportunities for further educations during the training. She stayed with Gem TV with some other alumni.

In 2002 she directed her first documentary, Stolen Childhood, that address the issue of under-aged marriage in Ethiopia by telling the true story of a young girl forced into marriage. The film won her a few awards in Ethiopia and around the world. From then on she has directed or assistant directed documentaries and films related to social justice and social welfare, often in cooperation with NGOs or international campaigns. Her focus has expanded from Ethiopia into other African countries.

In 2014 she was selected to attend the Cannes Film Festival through the "From Addis To Cannes" program along with four other Ethiopian filmmakers to access further film-making resources. She was the first of several women filmmakers in Ethiopia who had this opportunity.

== Filmography ==
=== Documentaries and documentary dramas ===
- Stolen Childhood (2002)
- Pillar of the House (2004)
- Reaching the Unreachable (2006)

=== Films ===
- Exploring Employment Potential through Road Works – The ILO experience (2005)
- "Calling the Stars"

== Awards and recognition ==
In 2008, her film Stolen Childhood won the Award on Rights and Justice in the 2nd Addis International Film Festival and in 2012 she received the 24th ONE WORLD MEDIA award on behalf of Gem TV for this film.

In 2018 her short film "Calling the Stars" was an official selection of short films of the 23rd Zanzibar International Film Festival.
