= Triangle: Going to America =

2014 Ethiopian action film

- Directed by: Theodros Teshome
- Written by: Theodros Teshome
- Produced by: Gerald Lacey; Jessica Mathews; Craig Robinson
- Starring: Kristos Andrews; Mahder Assefa; Abebe Balcha; Isabella Rain Barbieri; Solomon Bogale; Steve Crest; Jane Drewett; Joel Layogan; Abraham Luna; Jessica Mathews
- Release date: 18 June 2014
- Running time: 90 minutes
- Country: Ethiopia
- Language: Amharic

Triangle: Going to America is a 2014 Ethiopian action thriller film written and directed by Theodros Teshome. It was nominated in three different categories at the 2015 Africa Movie Academy Awards; Best Film in an African Language, Best Director and Best Film.

It won the "Festival Founders' Award- Narrative" at the 2015 Pan African Film Festival and also won "Audience Award" at the Rwanda Film Festival also in 2015.

== Synopsis ==
A film that spanned three continents and deals with the issue of illegal immigration to America. Kaleab and Jemal are willing to whatever it takes to reach America for a better life. On the arduous journey, they meet the beautiful Winta (Mahder Assefa), a fellow migrant from neighboring Eritrea. Kaleab and Winta fall in love as they make their way from East Africa through Libya, Italy, Mexico and finally to America.

== Cast ==
- Kristos Andrews as Switch
- Mahder Assefa as Winta
- Abebe Balcha as Dr. Abdurahim
- Isabella Rain Barbieri as Little Margarita
- Solomon Bogale as Kaleab
- Steve Crest as Police Officer Crest
- Jane Drewett as Nurse (Jane Monroe)
- Joel Layogan as Dr. Sanchez
- Abraham Luna as Mexican Blood Guy #2
- Jessica Mathews (I) as Mrs. Abdurahim
