= Girum Ermias =

Ethiopian film actor (born 1978)

- Born: 16 March 1978 (age 48); Addis Ababa, Ethiopia
- Education: Hollyland Academy
- Occupations: Actor; scriptwriter; director
- Years active: 2005–present
- Height: 1.85 m (6 ft 1 in)
- Children: 2

Girum Ermias (Amharic: ግሩም ኤርሚያስ; born 16 March 1978) is an Ethiopian actor, director and scriptwriter. He dominated the Ethiopian film industry by starring more than fifteen films.

He was best known in notable films such as Hermela (2005), Siryet (2007), Moriam Meder (2008), and Lamba (2015).

== Life and career ==
Girum Ermias was born on 16 March 1978 in Addis Ababa, Ethiopia. At an early age, Girum developed his acting interests. He attended Alem Maya Primary School for his primary education and Addis Ketema High School and Ayer Tena High School for his secondary education. He then began scriptwriting, directing as well as advanced to diploma from Ethiopia's Hollyland Art Academy.

He starred in more than fifteen films that are almost considered notable: Hermela (2005), Siryet (2007), Moriam Meder (2008), and Lamba (2015). Girum acknowledges film contents which have high social effect and "enlightening".

Girum is a father of two children.

== Filmography ==
Title	Year
Hermela	2005
Siryet	2007
Moriam Meder	2008
Abay vs Vegas	2010
Tisisir	2010
Tizita	2010
Amalayu	2011
Yilugnta	2012
Tsinu Kal	2013
Bechis Tedebke	2014
Batakoyugn	2014
Lamba	2015
Albo	2015
Seba Zetegn	2016
Tefetari	2019
Wiha Ena Work	2019
Yesuf Abeba	2023
