= Crumbs (film) =

2015 Ethiopian science fiction film

- Directed by: Miguel Llansó
- Release date: January 27, 2015 (International Film Festival Rotterdam)
- Running time: 68 minutes
- Country: Ethiopia
- Budget: $225,000

Crumbs is a 2015 Ethiopian post-apocalyptic science fiction romance film. It is the first feature film from Spanish-born director Miguel Llansó.

Filmed around Dallol, Ethiopia on a budget of $225,000, Crumbs "takes an exotic and sometimes surreal approach to what's essentially a simple, touching love story". It premiered at the Rotterdam International Film Festival, as well as the Nightfall Jury Mention at the 2015 Los Angeles Film Festival and the Award for Best First Feature Film at the 2015 Fantasia International Film Festival.

== Synopsis ==
In a dazzlingly imaginative vision of a postapocalyptic Ethiopia, a hapless scavenger embarks on a surreal adventure involving a mysterious UFO, witches, Santa Claus, Nazi knights, and more. Conjuring a loop-the-loop universe from the detritus of late-twentieth-century pop culture (from Michael Jordan to Ninja Turtles), this psychedelic fantasia surprises and charms as it spins off its own giddy axis.

== See also ==
- List of Afrofuturist films
