= Leza Awards =

Ethiopian music and film award

- Awarded for: Best Music Album; Best Music Single; Best Music Video; Best New Album; Best Feature Film; Lifetime Achievement
- Sponsored by: Ibex Band; Roha Band
- Location: Hilton Hotel, Addis Ababa, Ethiopia
- Country: Ethiopia

Television/radio coverage
- Network: Sheger FM 102.1 (radio); ARTS TV; Fana TV

Leza Awards (Amharic: ለዛ ሽልማት) is an Ethiopian annual film and music award held in Hilton Hotel, in Addis Ababa, Ethiopia since 2010. The award show broadcast on television channels and radio on Sheger FM 102.1.

In 2014, Leza introduced lifetime achievement award for outstanding pioneers of Ethiopian musicians. The Leza Radio Listeners' Choice Award gives both film and music recognition.

== Overview ==
Leza Awards is an annual music and film award where performers of both awarded for contribution of their work with achieve market. In 2014, Leza introduced lifetime achievement award that recognize Ethiopian pioneer musicians. In 2015, seven pioneers who were deemed in contribution of Ethiopian music awarded. The finalists judged based on public vote which takes for one month. The Leza Radio Listeners' Choice Award gives both film and music recognition. Leza awards for primarily in 6 categories:

- Best Music Album
- Best Music Single
- Best Music Video
- Best New Album
- Best Feature Film
- Lifetime Achievement
