= Gossaye Tesfaye =

Ethiopian singer and songwriter (born 1975)

Gossaye Tesfaye ጎሳዬ ተስፋዬ
- Born: April 1975 (age 51); Addis Ababa, Ethiopia
- Origin: Addis Ababa
- Genre: Ethiopian music
- Occupations: Singer; songwriter
- Instrument: Vocals
- Years active: 1993–present
- Labels: Gosaye Tesfaye Inc; Nahom Records

Gossaye Tesfaye (Amharic: ጎሳዬ ተስፋዬ; born April 1975) is an Ethiopian singer and songwriter.

In 1993, Gossaye performed at nightclubs in Addis Ababa before being discovered by musical group Kistane Band. In 2004, he released Evangadi, featuring fellow singer Alemayehu Hirpo. This was followed by Satamagn Bila (2007) and Siyamish Yamegnal (2019).

== Biography ==
Gossaye Tesfaye was born in April 1975 in Addis Ababa and grew up in Merkato. He attended Yekatit 23 Elementary School and completed secondary school at Kolfe Comprehensive Secondary School. While in high school, he sang to his fellow students as he was a member of a Red Cross Music Society Group formed by students. He then worked for approximately five months in the group.

Gossaye joined Mestawet, a music and theater group and began his senior career. In 1993, Gossaye performed in Addis Ababa's night clubs for the first time. In the restaurant of Shewaget, he performed for four years. He then hired by Kistane Band where he performed for one year.

In 2004, with his collaborator Alemayehu Hirpo, he released Evangadi. On 2 July 2007, he released widely acclaimed album titled Satamagn Bila. In 2019, he released Siyamish Yamegnal. In November 2024, he released "Zim", a controversial single which has no clear explanation. The music video features prominent late Ethiopian singers while the video thumbnail features a demolished house.

== Discography ==
=== Studio albums ===
Albums list with singles
Evangadi
- Released: 2004
- Label: Evangadi Production
- Singles:
  - "Kurat"
  - "Evangadi"
  - "Baytware"
  - "Yasebshale"
  - "Endet Yezelkal"
  - "Yane Lij Eyalen"
  - "Chaw Chaw"
  - "Endete Argoshale"
  - "Ataker Keri"
  - "Sentune Ayehute"
Satamagn Bila
- Released: 2 July 2007
- Label: Nahom Records
- Singles:
  - "Tameryalesh"
  - "Koya Babo"
  - "Satamehagn Bila"
  - "Yene Neger"
  - "Enateye"
  - "Wib Nat"
  - "Konjiye"
  - "Ewedihalew Bila"
  - "Akoyat"
  - "Zim"
  - Tuxedo"
  - "Min Adergalehu"
  - "Sew Telamdo"
Siyamish Yamegnal
- Released: 6 January 2019
- Label: Nahom Records
- Singles:
  - "Lagegnish Ande"
  - "Selam Yisten"
  - "Teregagash Woy"
  - "Serk Addis"
  - "Benetelash"
  - "Yale Fikir Kentu"
  - "Wub Alem"
  - "Yitayegnal"
  - "Dagna Dagna"
  - "Chir Kalew Bota"
  - "Siyamish Yamegnal"
  - "Libuan Alfo"
  - "Hasab Yeleshim"

=== Non-album singles ===
- "Zim" (2024)
- "Hagere" (2021)
