= Hermon Hailay =

Ethiopian film writer/director

- Born: Huruta, Ethiopia
- Occupations: Film director, writer

Hermon Hailay is an Ethiopian film writer/director. In 2014, she was invited to attend the Cannes Film Festival “From Addis to Cannes Workshop”. She directed several critically and commercially successful domestic DVD films before completing her first theatrical feature film, Price of Love.

The film was invited to the Official Selection at Toronto International Film Festival 2015. It also screened in Official Competition at FESPACO 2015 where it won the Special Prize of Ouagadougou. It has gone on to compete in numerous international film festivals and has won multiple awards.

== Personal life ==
Hermon Hailey was born in the motherland of Huruta, Ethiopia. Her father's death inspired her to become a film writer.

== Filmography ==
Year	Title
2012	Baleguru
2013	Yaltasebew
2015	Price of Love
