= Ethiopian International Film Festival =

Ethiopian film festival

- Location: Addis Ababa, Ethiopia
- Established: 2005
- Founded by: Yirgashewa Teshome
- Hosted by: Linkage Arts Resource Center
- Language: Amharic (for domestic films); English/Multilingual (for foreign films)

The Ethiopian International Film Festival (EIFF) is an annual Ethiopian film festival that takes place in November in Addis Ababa.The festival was established 2005 and is organized by Linkage Arts Resource Center (LARC) to showcase and promote Ethiopian and African films.

== History and founding ==
In 2004, organizers of Uganda's Amakula International Film Festival advised Yirgashewa Teshome, to run a local festival as a prerequisite to involve Ethiopian in international film festivals. In 2005, the first edition was held at the Imperial Hotel with ten locally produced films in competition. The winners included Hermela (ሔርሜላ) (2005) directed by Yonas Birhane Mewa for Best Feature Film, Kibrenek, and (Gudifecha/Adoption) (ጉዲፈቻ) a 2002 romantic comedy by Tatek Tadesse.Two of the winners were invited to represent Ethiopia at the Amakula Festival, offering LARC its first meaningful entry into the international film festival arena. This opportunity provided insights that would inform the subsequent development of the Ethiopian International Film Festival (EIFF).

By its 4th edition in 2009, EIFF had expanded in scope, screening 64 films from 23 countries over the course of eight days and introduced 14 awards categories recognizing the best in Ethiopian filmmaking: Best Feature Film, Best Documentary film, Best Short film, Best Animation film, Best Director, Best Screenplay, Best Cinematography, Best Actor, Best Actress, Best Supporting Actor, Best Supporting Actress, Best Makeup, Best Costume, Lifetime Achievement award, and Audience Choice Award .

The 7th Ethiopian International Film Festival was held in Addis Ababa from 26 November to 2 December 2012. The theme of the festival "Many Dreams, One Vision" coined to align with upcoming 50th anniversary of the African Union headquartered in Addis Ababa. Following announcements and calls for participation in FM radios and private newspapers, films from Africa, Europe, Asia, North and South America have participated on the festival. The festival was sponsored by AMA Art Moves Africa, Hubert3 Balls Fund, Cinema Mondial Tour & Jan Vrijmann. The awards were scaled back to nine to include: Best Director, Best Feature Film, Best Screenwriter, Best Cinematography, Best Actress, Best Actor, Best Supporting Actress, and Best Supporting Actor and Audiences’ Choice Award.

For its 10th edition EIFF screened appropriately 100 feature, shorts, fiction, documentary, animation, experimental, classics and contemporary films around the world.

In 2024, Doka by director Kidist Yilma was the big winner of the festival. It swept the award for Best Feature Film, Best screenplay ( Kidist Yilma and Beza Hailu) and Best Director.

In 2025, the Festival celebrated its 20th anniversary.
