= Price of Love (film) =

- Directed by: Hermon Hailay
- Written by: Hermon Hailay; Max Conil
- Produced by: Max Conil
- Starring: Eskindir Tameru; Fereweni Gebregergs
- Cinematography: Mulgeta Amaru
- Edited by: Max Conil; Habtegebrel Abebe
- Production company: HM Film Production
- Release date: 3 March 2015 (FESPACO)
- Running time: 99 minutes
- Country: Ethiopia
- Language: Amharic

Price of Love is a 2015 Ethiopian drama film directed by Hermon Hailay which was screened in the Official Selection at 2015 Toronto International Film Festival.

It was selected in Official Competition at FESPACO 2015 where it won the Special Prize of Ouagadougou. It has gone on to compete in numerous international film festivals and won multiple awards.

It tells the story of a young Addis Ababa taxi driver gets caught up in the dark side of love, causing his taxi to be stolen. He finds himself stuck in a relationship with a prostitute, making him confront his past and discover what is the price of love.

== Awards and nominations ==
Year	Award	Category	Result
2015	Panafrican Film and Television Festival of Ouagadougou	Special Prize of Ouagadougou	Won
2015	Créteil International Women's Film Festival	Grand Prix	Nominated
2015	International Pan-African Film Festival, Cannes	Dikalo Award Best Film	Won
2015	International Pan-African Film Festival, Cannes	Dikalo Award Best Actor	Won
2015	International Pan-African Film Festival, Cannes	Dikalo Award Best Actress	Won
2015	Zanzibar International Film Festival	Bi Kidude Award (Chairman's Award)	Won
2015	Écrans noirs	Écrans d'Or	Nominated
2015	Toronto International Film Festival	Grolsch People’s Choice Award	Nominated
2015	Festival du cinéma Africain de Khouribga	Prix Coup de cœur du jury	Won
2015	Festival du cinéma Africain de Khouribga	Prix culturel Don quichotte	Won
2015	Festival du cinéma Africain de Khouribga	Best Actor	Won
2015	Festival International du Film de Femmes de Salé	Grand Prix	Nominated
2015	Africa International Film Festival	Best Screenplay	Won
2015	Lumières d'Afrique	Prix du Jury Signis	Won
2015	Stockholm International Film Festival	Bronze Horse	Nominated
2016	Jeonju International Film Festival	Grand Prix	Nominated

== List of festival appearances ==
Festival	Date	Type
Panafrican Film and Television Festival of Ouagadougou	March 2015	World premiere
Créteil International Women's Film Festival	March 2015	European premiere
Panafrican Film Festival, Cannes	April 2015	Cannes premiere
Black Cinema Brazil	May 2015	South American premiere
Africa Film Trinidad & Tobago	July 2015	Caribbean premiere
Zanzibar International Film Festival	July 2015	Tanzanian premiere
Écrans Noirs	July 2015	Cameroon premiere
Festival du cinéma Africain de Khouribga	September 2015	Morocco premiere
Toronto International Film Festival	September 2015	North American premiere
Festival International du Film de Femmes de Salé	October 2015	
Filmfest Hamburg	October 2015	German premiere
African Film Festival Ottawa	October 2015	
Cambridge African Film Festival	October 2015	
Africa in Motion	October 2015	
Film Africa	November 2015	
Afryka Eye	November 2015	
Africa International Film Festival	November 2015	Nigeria premiere
Virginia Film Festival	November 2015	US premiere
Lumieres d'Afrique	November 2015	
Cairo International Film Festival	November 2015	Egypt premiere
Stockholm International Film Festival	November 2015	Scandinavian premiere
Palm Springs International Film Festival	January 2016	West Coast premiere
International Film Festival Rotterdam	January 2016	Dutch premiere
Pan African Film Festival	February 2016	Los Angeles premiere
AFI New African Film Festival	March 2016	
Caravanes des Cinemas d'Afrique	March 2016	
Washington DC International Film Festival	April 2016	DC premiere
Jeonju International Film Festival	April 2016	Asian premiere
New York African Film Festival	May 2016	New York premiere
