= Meseret Mebrate =

Ethiopian actress (born 1980)

- Born: 1980 (age 45–46); Addis Ababa, Ethiopia
- Education: Addis Ababa University
- Occupation: Actress
- Years active: 2002–present
- Spouse: Zewdu Shibabaw (m. 2018)

Meseret Mebrate (Amharic: መሰረት መብራቴ; born 1980) is an Ethiopian actress. She debuted by starring the 2002 film Gudifecha and continued acting in various films and television dramas. She was known for acting in television drama Gemena (2009) and Dana (2013).

== Life and career ==
Meseret Mebrate was born in Addis Ababa in Ghibi Gabriel. She was raised by her parents. She studied at Addis Ababa University and debuted in film at the age of 18. Later, she starred in various TV dramas and movies such as Gudifecha (2002), and the best known one is Gemena (2009) and Dana (2013).

In April 2018, Meseret married Zewdu Shibabaw, a brother of Ethiopian singer Egigayehu Shibabaw (Gigi).

== Filmography ==
Film
Title	Year
Gudifecha	2002
Zema Hiwot	2006
Moriam Mider	2008
Hiroshima	2011
Hiryet	2015

Television
Title	Year
Gemena	2009
Dana	2013
