= Addis International Film Festival =

Ethiopian film festival

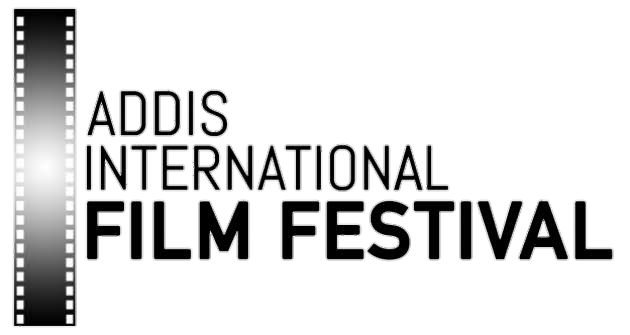
- Established: 2007
- Hosted by: Initiative Africa
- Language: Amharic (for domestic films); English/Multilingual (for foreign films)
- Website: Official website

The Addis International Film Festival (AIFF) is an Ethiopian annual film festival organized by Initiative Africa and held in Addis Ababa. Established in 2007, the festival showcases experienced or amateur filmmakers candidate from Ethiopia and Africa, and is one of the largest independent documentary cinema festivals in Africa.

The Addis International Film Festival encourages young filmmakers and enthusiasts through engaging workshops.

== Notable events ==
The 4th AIFF edition was held from 26 March to 4 April 2010.

The 16th edition of AIFF was organized from 25–29 May 2022 and more than 30 films were selected from around the world to develop filmmaker curations.
