= ARTS TV =

Ethiopian television channel

- Country: Ethiopia
- Network: Digital media and satellite television network

Programming
- Languages: Amharic; English
- Picture format: 1080i 16:9, 4:3 (HDTV); Downscaled to 576i for the SDTV feed

Ownership
- Owner: African Renaissance Television Services S.C.
- Sister channels: Arts TV World (Digital media)

History
- Launched: 2018; 8 years ago

Links
- Website: www.artstv.tv

African Renaissance Television Services (ARTS TV) is an Ethiopian free-to-air entertainment, and news television channel based in Addis Ababa, Ethiopia. ARTS TV was created to provide Ethiopia with a television station with no party affiliation and an Africa-centric point of view, looking at the continent's culture, history, arts, politics, and news.

ARTS TV creates productions and broadcasts programming primarily in Amharic with the company working on complementary English support. It has its studios located in Addis Ababa, Ethiopia and has a digital presence based on productions that it generates from in-house sources and from its subsidiary company African Renaissance Television Service, Inc. based in Chicago, Illinois.

== History ==
ARTS TV was initially founded in 2016 by twenty-two Ethiopians that include athletes, celebrities, educators, physicians, attorneys, and international CEOs. The company was created initially to produce and broadcast media focused on the cultures, politics, art, food, fashion, and news of Africa.
