= Hilton Addis =

Hotel in Addis Ababa, Ethiopia

- ሂልተን አዲስ
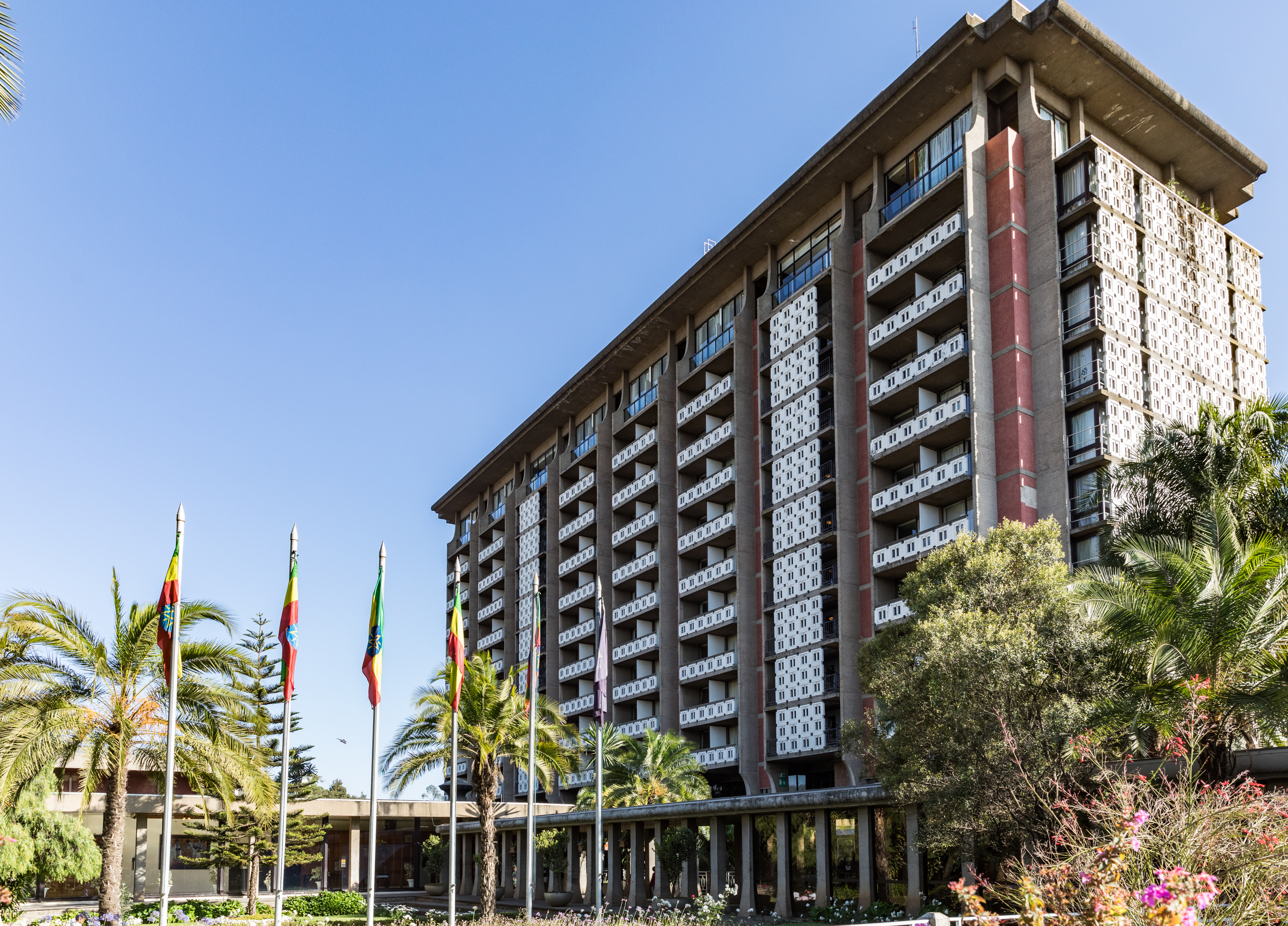
- Hilton Addis in December 2017

General information
- Status: Active, under renovation
- Type: Private
- Architectural style: Contemporary, albeit partly influenced by Lalibela's rock-hewn churches
- Location: Menelik II Avenue, Addis Ababa, Ethiopia
- Coordinates: 9.0818548°N 38.765005°E
- Opened: 1969
- Owner: Hilton Worldwide
- Operator: Claus Steiner (General Manager)

Technical details
- Size: 60,000 square meters

Other information
- Number of rooms: +400

Website
- Official website

Hilton Addis (Amharic: ሂልተን አዲስ) is a private international hotel in Addis Ababa, Ethiopia owned by Hilton Worldwide. It was opened during the Emperor Haile Selassie regime in 1969, after a 50-year management contract signed between the Hilton Worldwide and the Ethiopian government that would proscribe other branding outside Worldwide permission.

Hilton has been an iconic landmark for Addis Ababa and Ethiopia until the foundation of Sheraton Addis in 1998. It is located at Menelik II Avenue.

== History ==
Hilton Addis was first opened in 1969 under Emperor Haile Selassie after Hilton Worldwide signed a 50-year contract with the Ethiopian government. This contract could be renewed each decade, giving Hilton Worldwide a 20% share of revenues, while also restricting it from operating another property in the country under the Hilton brand.

Hilton has now 17 brands globally, including Hilton Hotels & Resorts, which operates in Ethiopia. Hilton Addis's design resembled to rock-hewn churches in Lalibela, becoming iconic property of the nation and landmark of Addis Ababa until the foundation of Sheraton Addis in 1998.

== Structure and settlement ==
Lying in a vast area of land covering 60,000 square meters plot, the hotel is located in Menelik II Avenue and has a 12-storey main building, alongside a garden wing extension added in 1987, making the hotel multi-rooms over 400.

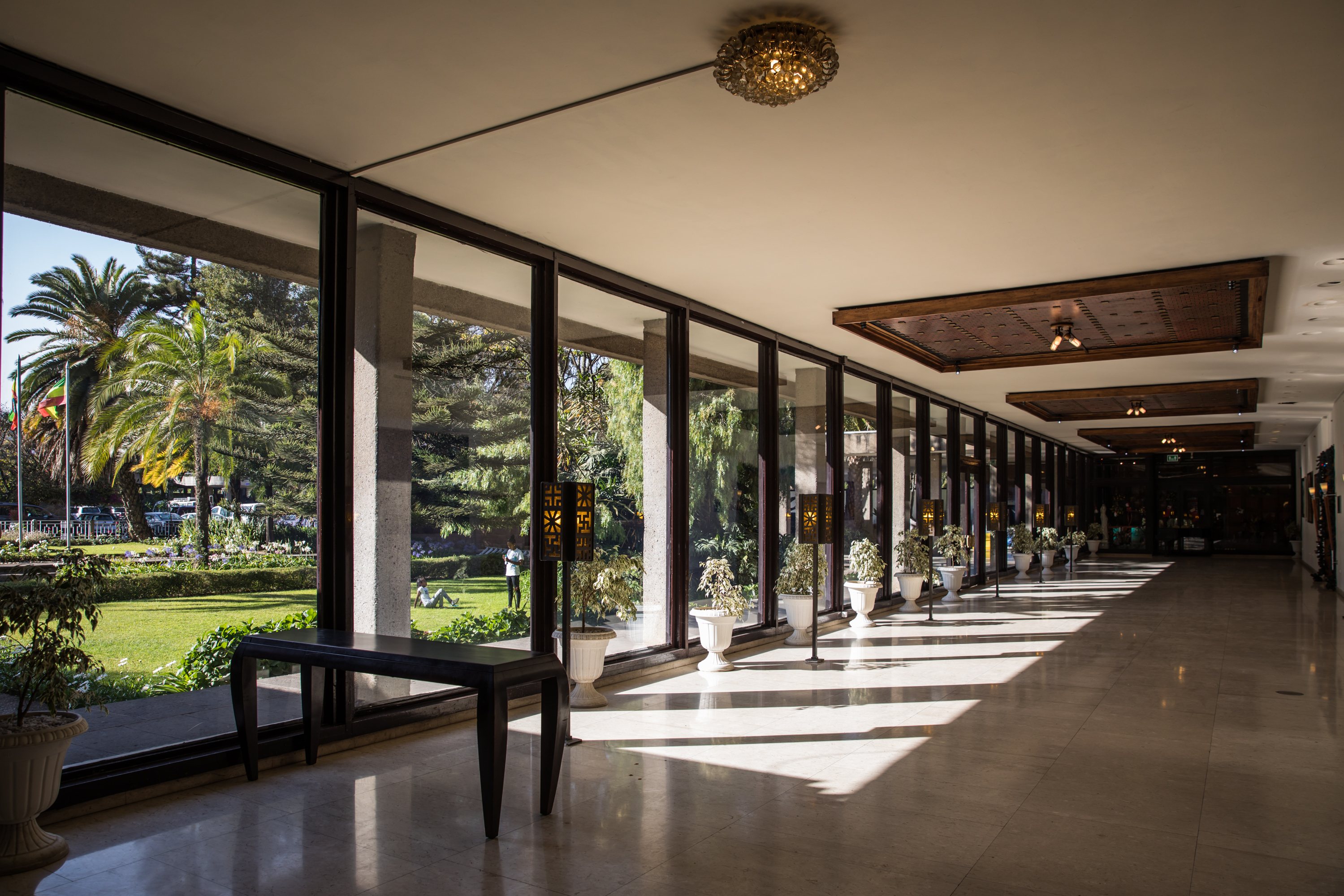
Inside Hilton Addis room

However, the hotel needs special infrastructural improvements including electromechanical appliance and interior of the rooms. The renovation costed 280 million dollars in the past decades, although has not government approval yet.

In the hotel, there are adequate services for guests, such as a swimming pool with natural spring water and a gym.

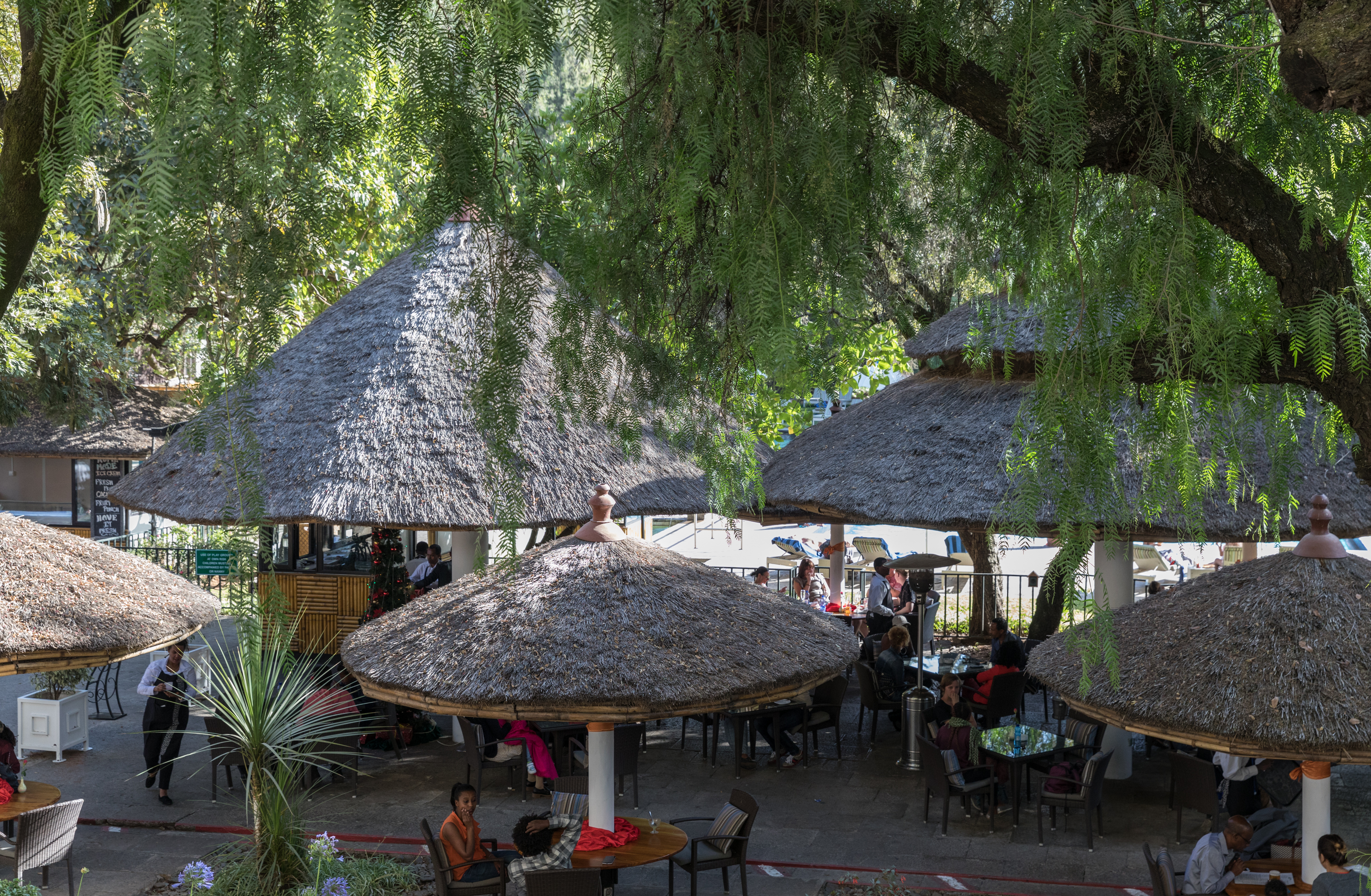
Outdoor dining at Hilton Addis

According to Hilton's manager Fisseha Asres, the hotel frequently met with shortcomings of infrastructure, as "the renovations were the major reason for the hotel being downgraded, among other factors." Other developers in the country also viewed the management contract with Hilton Worldwide, such as Samuel Tafesse's Sunshine Group for its property in Hawassa and Tsemex Hotels & Business PLC of Rezene Ayalew, for a property in Addis Ababa. Currently, Sunshine Group is working to develop Hilton Hawassa after it signed a management deal with Hilton Worldwide two years ago. After signing agreement, Hilton Worldwide requested permission to the Ethiopian government to open brand in Addis Ababa, Hawassa and Bahir Dar, the former was opened in 2020.
