= List of Ethiopian films =

This is a list of Ethiopian films that are notable and internationally acclaimed.

Year	Title	Director	Genre	Notes
1965	Who is Hirut's father?	Elala Ibsa	Drama	
1976	Harvest: 3,000 Years	Haile Gerima		
1979	Bush Mama	Haile Gerima	Drama	
1982	Ashes and Embers	Haile Gerima	Drama	
1985	After Winter: Sterling Brown	Haile Gerima	Documentary	
1993	Sankofa	Haile Gerima	Drama	
1994	Imperfect Journey	Haile Gerima	Documentary	
1995	Price of Love	Hermon Hailay		
1997	Blood Is Not Fresh Water	Theo Eshetu	Documentary	
1999	Adwa	Haile Gerima	Documentary	
2003	Kezkaza Welafen	Theodros Teshome	Drama	
2007	Yewendoch Guday	Henok Ayele	Romantic comedy	
2007	Siryet	Yidnekachew Shumete	Crime thriller film	
2008	Teza	Haile Gerima		
2009	Selanchi	Belay Getaneh	Romantic drama	
2012	Diplomat	Naod Gashaw	Spy thriller	
2014	Difret	Zeresenay Berhane Mehari	Drama	
2015	Lamb	Yared Zeleke	Drama	
2015	Price of Love	Hermon Hailay	Drama	
2019	Min Alesh?	Amleset Muchie	Drama, sports	
2019	Running Against the Wind	Jan Philipp Weyl	Drama	
2020	Finding Sally	Tamara Dawit	Documentary	
2021	Superno	Abel Mekasha	Science fiction, psychological thriller	
