= Ethiopia (disambiguation) =

Ethiopia is a country in the east of Africa, before the 20th century called Abyssinia.

Ethiopia, Etiopia or Aethiopia may also refer to:

- Aethiopia, Classical Greek term for parts of North Africa or the northern half of Africa
- Aethiopian Sea, ancient name given to the southern part of the Atlantic Ocean
- Ethiopia (A-01), an Ethiopian Navy training ship in commission from 1962 to 1991 and the largest ship in the Ethiopian Navy
- "Ethiopia", a song by Joni Mitchell from Dog Eat Dog, 1985
- "Ethiopia", a song by Red Hot Chili Peppers from I'm with You, 2011
- "Ethiopia" (Teddy Afro song), 2017
- Ethiopian movement, a religious movement in end of 19th century southern Africa
- Etiopia (Serbian band), a punk rock group
- Etiopía / Plaza de la Transparencia metro station, in Mexico City, Mexico
- Etiopía / Plaza de la Transparencia (Mexico City Metrobús, Line 2), a BRT station in Mexico City, Mexico
- Etiopía / Plaza de la Transparencia (Mexico City Metrobús, Line 3), a BRT station in Mexico City, Mexico

== See also ==
- Aethiops (disambiguation)
- Ethopia, a genus of moths
