= Etorika =

2026 studio album by Teddy Afro

Studio album by Teddy Afro
- Released: 16 April 2026
- Genre: Ethiopian music; reggae
- Length: 96:00
- Language: Amharic; Guarge; Ge'ez
- Label: Addis Zema
- Producer: Teddy Afro

Teddy Afro chronology
Ethiopia (2017)	Etorika (2026)

Etorika (Amharic; ኢቶሪካ) is a studio album by Ethiopian singer Teddy Afro, released on 16 April 2026. On 15 April, Teddy announced on social media its release via his YouTube channel on 15 April. Widely considered by music industry experts as the "largest digital music launches in Ethiopian history" with significant popularity by viewership, the album deviated Teddy's work by generating over 15 million views on YouTube within 24 hours.

Etorika attract widespread popularity and support from Ethiopia and abroad, quickly gained fandom and viral on social media platforms, surpassing his previous album Ethiopia (2017).

== Background ==
On 16 April 2026, Teddy Afro released Etorica via YouTube as an anticipated comeback album following Ethiopia (2017). Within the first hour, the album generated nearly 15 million combined views, and increased significantly within eight hours when fans from North America, Europe and the Middle East joined viewership. The Ethiopian music industry experts noted the album quick recognition as "largest digital music launches in Ethiopian history". Some of his tracks like "Jember" became the most viewed single in YouTube, reaching from 8 to 10 million viewers within 24 hours, "Das Tal (Ansaw)" (7 to 9 million), "Etorika" (5 to 7 million), "Sememene" (4 to 5 million) and "Tsion Mushraye" (3-4 million viewers).

The album is Teddy's first day digital performance other than distribution from record label, remarkable when adjusted for language, geography, and audience size.

== Controversy and ban ==
Like its predecessor album Yasteseryal (2005), the album garnered significant controversy regarding alleged politically sensitive nature. The Ethiopian government, under the Prosperity Party, reportedly banned the album from press conferences. On 15 April, Teddy announced on social media page that he opted to release the album via his official YouTube channel after receiving backlash. The Coalition for Ethiopian Unity (CUD) condemned the ban, stating the government used justification for upcoming election in June. “We have learned recently that Artist Tewodros Kassahun’s (Teddy Afro) Press conference is obstructed." Some also contended that the ruling party under Abiy Ahmed government views Teddy's songs unimportant.

== Track listing ==
Etorika
No.	Title	Length
1.	"Das Tal (Ansaw)"	7:19
2.	"Samnew"	5:04
3.	"Etorika"	4:39
4.	"Tewedaj"	3:47
5.	"Sememene (GuReggae)"	5:26
6.	"Tsion Mushraye"	6:32
7.	"Tintago (Pintago)"	5:00
8.	"Yemaereg Tig (Abra Nuariye)"	4:49
9.	"Shih Bibal (Back to 90s)"	5:03
10.	"Tayegn"	3:57
11.	"Bemeskotu"	6:11
12.	"Bilchita"	5:05
13.	"Yeazo Emba"	4:47
14.	"Ze Tsedal"	5:00
15.	"Merema"	7:45
16.	"Merkeb"	5:28
17.	"Sema Erase"	3:41
18.	"Jember"	6:34
Total length:		96:00

== See also ==
- "Tikur Sew"
- "Ethiopia"
