= Minor cinema =

Aspect of film theory

Minor cinema is a concept that is linked to film theory and defines and challenges the current hegemony in representations; a recent overview and recognition of the term can be found in The Routledge Encyclopedia of Film Theory (2013).

== Origins ==
The term originates from French philosopher Gilles Deleuze and psychotherapist Félix Guattari's study Kafka: Toward a Minor Literature (1975) they made on "minor literature", which concerns people living in a language that is not their own and 'deterritorialize' it. The link to cinema would be smoothly elaborated in Deleuze's The Time-Image (1985). Film scholar Tom Gunning used the term to single out filmmakers that made films simply for the sake of making films; affirming their own marginality without for that matter being antagonistic (see also scholar Meaghan Morris), devoting themselves to non-professionalism and being truthful to its own cause.

Another of minor cinema's main definitions can be found by David E. James:

1. They are not part of the current hegemony.
2. It's immediately connected to politics because of its minority status.
3. The individual and the collective are mutually bounded with each other (collective enunciation).

"Minor cinema" indirectly relates to the big commercial studio system ("major cinema"), and many of the co-op's first films were found-footage works from the big studios. Dudley Andrew is labelling this cinema as a sort of festival cinema.

== Contemporary research ==
The term's significance in today's research can be seen in women's cinema (Butler 2002; parallel or oppositional cinema), postcolonial cinema (Rodowick 1997; fabulation defines minor cinema), queer cinema (White 2008; resourceless/politicized/experimental/becoming) and exilic cinema (Naficy 2001; part of his theory of accented cinema). The neglecting of "minor cinema" has been addressed in Adam Szymanski's Ph.D. thesis Minor cinemas of melancholy and therapy (2017).

== Cinematic waves ==
=== United States ===
In the United States, minor cinema emerged through exhibition and curation of avant-garde film within New York City during the 1940s through filmmakers such as Maya Deren and Marie Menken. Additionally, film societies such as Cinema 16 found success in focusing primarily on experimental and nonfictional film. Until the 1960s, minor cinema in the United States was a concept that was primarily accessed by those aligned with Hollywood (such as Val Lewton) and leading figures of pop culture such as Andy Warhol. By the late 1960s, political films were associated most often to European directors like French New Wave's Jean-Luc Godard and Margarethe von Trotta.

A part of this political stance was feminist film theory emerging during the 1970s and was influenced by second-wave feminism in the United States. In the 70s, feminist film theory focused on the function of female characters in the film but was later influenced by British theorist's concern in critical theory, Marxism, and psychology that would begin focusing on the reinforcement of sexism in cinematic production and the construct of viewing a subject. Media journals such as Camera Obscura emerged as a feminist medium in the late 1960s. There was a rise of black filmmakers, known as L.A. Rebellion within the UCLA Film School, who came to prominence due to the push of black students into prestigious, white universities through affirmative action and wanted to push away from Hollywood conventions. This movement included Charles Burnett (Killer of Sheep) and Haile Gerima (Sankofa) wanting to be identified with the liberation movements in the Third World, and their expression of Black pride and dignity. L.A. Rebellion defined themselves in a school of thought of seeking independence, the overturning of stereotypes, and social engagement.

== Criticism ==
William Brown is criticizing the term to be overly binary and suggests a more embracing definition like common cinema. On the other hand "minor cinema" has also been criticized for being too broad and generalizing.

== Examples of minor filmmakers ==
- Ousmane Sembène
- Yilmaz Güney
- Lino Brocka
- Glauber Rocha
- Pierre Perrault
- Youssef Chahine
- Haile Gerima
- Charles Burnett
