= Skip Norman =

US African-American filmmaker

Wilbert Reuben ("Skip") Norman (December 22, 1933 - March 18, 2015) was a Black American filmmaker, visual anthropologist, and educator.

== Biography and career ==
Skip Norman was born in Baltimore, Maryland, in 1933, and went to high school at Dunbar High School in Washington, DC.

Beginning in 1966, he joined the inaugural class of the German Film and Television Academy Berlin (DFFB), from which he graduated in 1969. As a student, he closely collaborated with a number of fellow students on films, including those of Harun Farocki. Three of his films, Strange Fruit, On Africa, and Washington DC November 1970 were broadcast on the WDR “Filmredaktion” (film unit of the West German Broadcasting channel) in 1971 and 1972.

In 1979, he was the cinematographer for Wilmington 10 — U.S.A. 10,000 directed by Haile Gerima. Haile Gerima described his choice to use Norman as a cinematographer thusly: "I know when I asked him to do the cinematography part of the 'Wilmington Ten,' it was out of his still photography work that I found impressive. That’s how I knew he would be the one to shoot the film."

Norman later obtained a PhD from The Ohio State University in 1984. From 1996 to 2010, he taught in the Eastern Mediterranean University's Faculty of Communication and Media Studies in Cyprus. He published in peer-reviewed journals, such as Visual Anthropology.

Norman died in Washington, DC, in 2015.

== Films ==
Recent 2023 retrospectives at the US National Gallery of Art and Open City Documentary Festival in London have highlighted his pioneering body of work of documentary and experimental films that looked at issues such as structural racism, Marxism, and inequality. The premiere of the digitization of his On Africa was the subject of a lecture and screening sponsored by Arsenal – Institute for Film and Video Art in 2021 and again further expanded in 2023, which explored his films through the lens of "Decolonial activism, cinema, visibility." In 2021, his film On Africa was also the subject of a keynote session at the international scholarly conference on documentary film and media Visible Evidence.

His filmography in which he served in different roles includes:

- Situationen (Situations) (1967)
- Brecht die Macht der Manipulateure (Break the Power of the Manipulators, 1967–68)
- Blues People (1968)
- Cultural Nationalism (1969)
- Strange Fruit (1969), his DFFB thesis film
- On Africa (1970), which was shown at the 1970 Festival of Mannheim
- Washington D.C. November 1970 (1970)
- Blackman’s Voluntary Army of Liberation (1970)
- Wilmington 10 — U.S.A. 10,000 (1979)
- But Then She's Betty Carter (1980)
- Spirit to Spirit: Nikki Giovanni (1986)
