= Adwa Victory Day =

National holiday of Ethiopia on 2 March

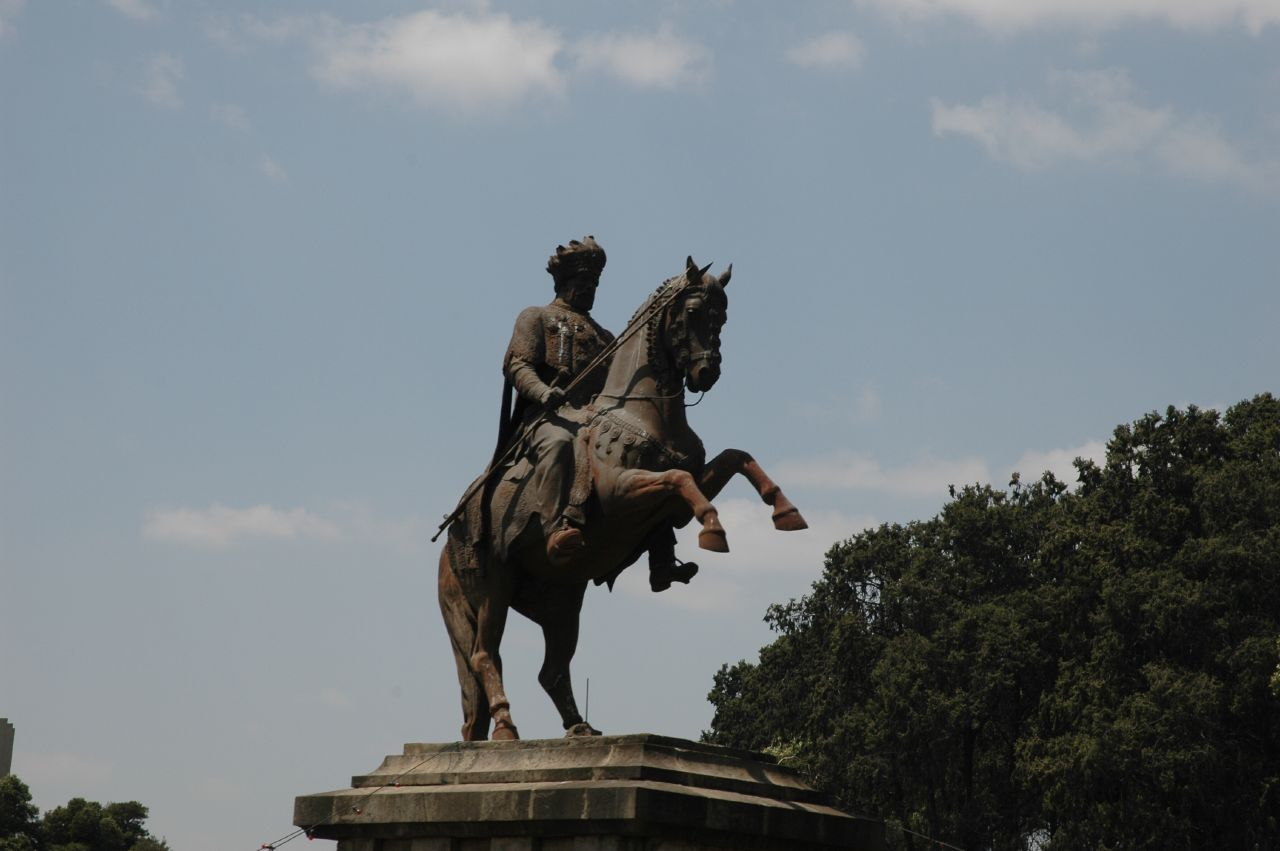
- Statue of Menelik II in Addis Ababa, which paid homage to the Day
- Type: National
- Significance: Ethiopia's victory over Italy at the Battle of Adwa in 1896
- Celebrations: Public parades with government officials and other public figures presented; Dramatic performance associated with the Battle of Adwa; Patriotic songs are played for example recently Gigi's songs and Teddy Afro's "Tikur Sew"
- Date: 2 March
- Frequency: Annual
- First time: 1903

Adwa Victory Day (Amharic: የዐድዋ ድል ቀን) is a national holiday in Ethiopia that commemorates Ethiopia's victory against Italian forces at the Battle of Adwa on 1 March 1896. Adwa Victory Day celebrations involve parades, dramatic and artistic performances reflecting Ethiopian culture. Adwa Victory Day is strongly associated with Pan-Africanism and the aspirations of black people.

== Celebration ==
Celebration involves parades in many places and cultural reflection wherever people gathered. Artistic and dramatic performances are also presented, such as kererto, shilela and fukera. All schools, banks, post offices and government offices are closed, with the exception of health facilities. Some taxi and public transportation services choose not to operate on this day, and shops are normally open but most close earlier than usual. In the capital Addis Ababa, government officials, patriots, foreign diplomats and the public gather at Menelik Square while the Ethiopian Police Orchestra play patriotic songs.

Male performers often wear jodhpurs and various types of vest; they carry the Ethiopian flag and various patriotic banners and placards, as well as traditional Ethiopian shields and swords called shotel. Female performers wear traditional dress called habesha kemis and some wear black gowns over all, while other place royal crowns on their heads to represent Empress Taytu. The celebration takes place not only in Addis Ababa, but also other cities such as Bahir Dar, Debre Markos and Adwa itself. Patriotic music plays a part as well, for example Gigi's ballad dedicated to the Battle of Adwa and Teddy Afro's "Tikur Sew" are frequently played during the celebration.

== Controversies ==
The commemoration has occasionally been marked by social and political tensions. Critics have raised concerns about the way the event is organized, the symbols it celebrates, and its role in the broader politics of national identity. Human rights organizations, including the Ethiopian Human Rights Commission, have reported incidents of excessive force by security personnel during Adwa Day gatherings in Addis Ababa. Most notably, during the 2023 celebration, a clash erupted between security forces and the people involving the dispersion of tear gas; police obstructed the road leading to both squares. In St. George's Cathedral, police fired tear gas to congregants and clergies while conducting an annual feast of Saint George. One person named Mekuanent Wodaj died and many injured by stampede. Prime Minister Abiy Ahmed blamed "unspecified entities for things that gone wrong during Adwa Victory Celebration in Addis Ababa."

Adwa’s legacy as a symbol of unity against colonialism is sometimes contested within Ethiopia’s ethnically diverse society. Some Oromo and southern Ethiopian communities view the glorification of Emperor Menelik II as problematic, arguing that his subsequent southern expansion campaigns were acts of internal conquest rather than national unification. Similarly, some have expressed that Tigray contributions to the victory have not been adequately acknowledged in national narratives, particularly amid political and military tensions with the central government.

Intellectuals and activists have also debated whether Adwa is used by successive governments as a tool for political legitimacy and nation-building. Critics suggest that the official narrative sometimes romanticizes the past while overlooking Ethiopia’s internal hierarchies and historic injustices.
