= Shirikiana Aina =

American film director, cinematographer, producer and writer

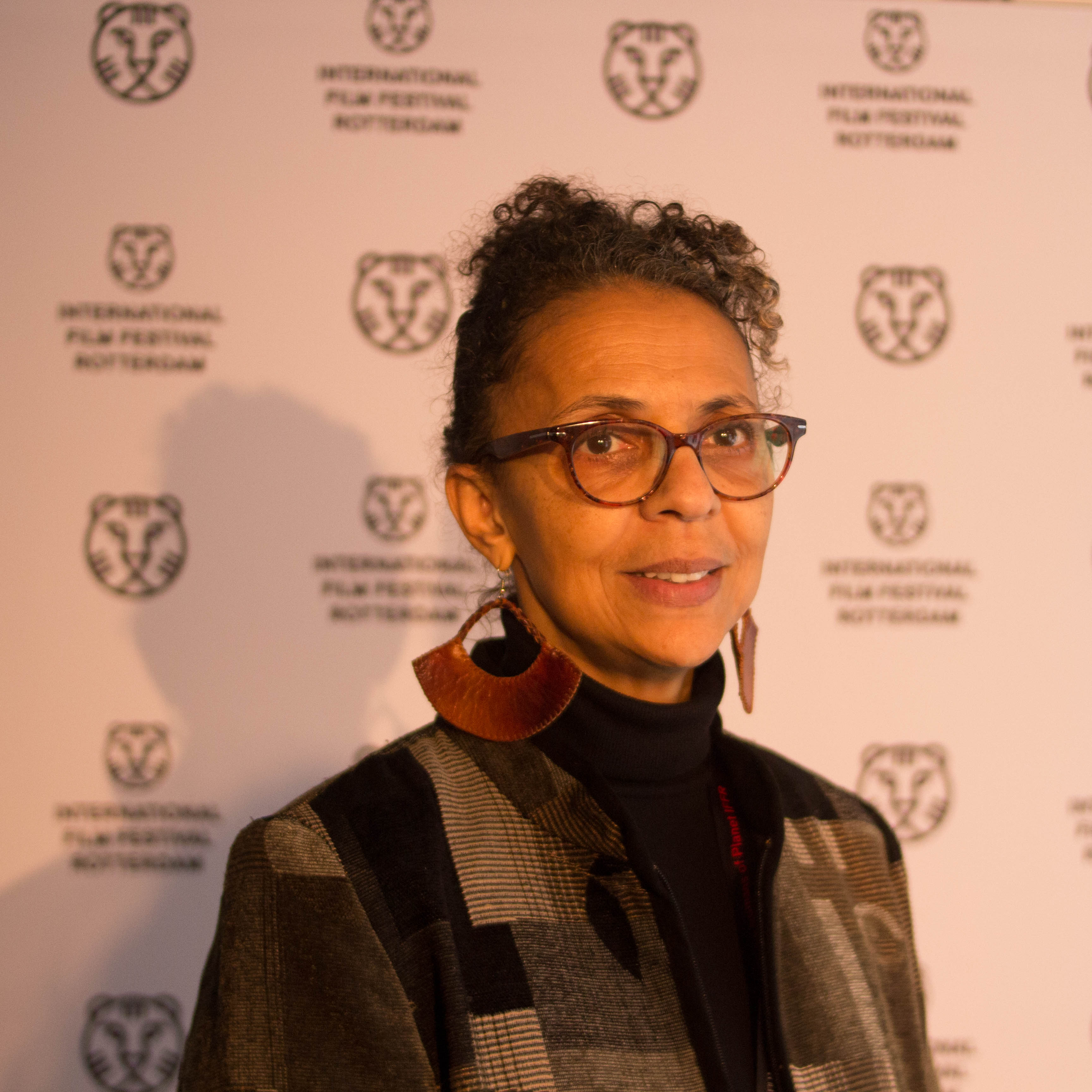
Shirikiana Aina at the International Film Festival Rotterdam in 2018

Shirikiana Aina (born September 9, 1955) is an American film director, cinematographer, producer, and writer. Shirikiana was born in Detroit, MI. She is a member of the LA Film Rebellion. She founded Mypheduh Films, Inc., a distribution company for independent Pan African Films. The company produced several features from the filmmakers of the LA Film Rebellion. She also co-founded Negod Gwad Productions, a nonprofit film company providing support to indie filmmakers. She has taught courses in script writing and film production at Howard University. She is married to film director Haile Gerima.

== Life and career ==
Shirikiana Aina attended Howard University and earned her Bachelor's in Film. She later attended UCLA and received an MA in African Film Studies in 1982. That same year she made Brick by Brick, an acclaimed short documentary film that exposes the gentrification of poor Black neighborhoods in Washington D.C.

In 1993 she co-produced the drama film Sankofa, which was nominated for the Golden Bear at the 43rd Berlin International Film Festival.

Aina's work is mostly rooted within the world of documentary film. In 1997, she filmed Through the Door of No Return, which document's her journey to Ghana to retrace the footsteps of her ancestors. The film premiered at the Toronto International Film Festival under the Planet Africa program created by artistic director Cameron Bailey. In 1998 she co-founded Sankofa Video, Books & Cafe in D.C. across the street from Howard University.

Aina directed Footprints of Pan Africanism in 2017 a documentary that explores the impact of the independence of Ghana on political movements around the world. In an interview at International Film Festival Rotterdam, Aina states "Racism and white superiority would rather cut off its own nose...than see blackness be human."

== Filmography ==
- Brick by Brick (1982)
- Sankofa (1993)
- Through the Door of No Return (1997)
- Footprints of Pan Africanism (2017)
- Residue (as actor) (2020)
