= Black Lions – Roman Wolves =

2026 five-part documentary film by Haile Gerima

Black Lions – Roman Wolves: The Children of Adwa is a 2026 five-part documentary film directed, produced and narrated by Haile Gerima, chronicling Ethiopian resistance to colonialism during the Second Italo-Ethiopian War. The film debuted at the Berlinale in February 2026.

== Synopsis ==
The film is composed of archival footage and contemporaneous eyewitness interviews.

== Production ==
Gerima began work on the film in 2008.
