= Bibliography of Haile Selassie =

This is bibliography of Haile Selassie I, the Emperor of Ethiopia, who reigned from 1930 to 1974. The list contains books with year of publication.

== List of books ==
- The Autobiography of Emperor Haile Sellassie I: King of Kings of All Ethiopia and Lord of All Lords (My Life and Ethiopia's Progress) (My Life... ... (My Life and Ethiopia's Progress) – 1999
- The Wise Mind of Emperor Haile Sellassie I – 2017
- Members Of A New Race: The Teachings Of H.I.M. Haile Sellassie 1 – 2017
- King of Kings: The Triumph and Tragedy of Emperor Haile Selassie I of Ethiopia – 2017
- Holy Bible: Rastafari Edition – 2019
- Selected Speeches of His Imperial Majesty Haile Selassie I – 2011
- Jah Rastafari Prayers: Rasta Prayers & Healing Scriptures – 2016
- Haile Selassie: The Life and Legacy of the Ethiopian Emperor Revered as the Messiah by Rastafarians – 2019
- A Journey to the Roots of Rastafari: The Essene Nazarite Link – 2014
- Books of the Ethiopian Bible: Missing from the Protestant Canon – 2019
- Emancipated From Mental Slavery: Selected Sayings of Marcus Garvey – 2013
- Ethiopia and the Origin of Civilization – 2017
- Prevail: The Inspiring Story of Ethiopia's Victory over Mussolini's Invasion, 1935–1941 – 2017
- Mansa Musa and Timbuktu: The History of the West African Emperor and Medieval Africa’s Most Fabled City – 2019
- The 1619 Project: A New Origin Story Hardcover – 2021
- The Rastafarians: Twentieth Anniversary Edition – 1997
- The Kebra Negast (the Book of the Glory of Kings), with 15 original illustrations (Aziloth Books) – 2013

== Music ==
- "Haile Selassie" by Teddy Afro (2001)
