= Max Penzel =

German film director (born 1977)

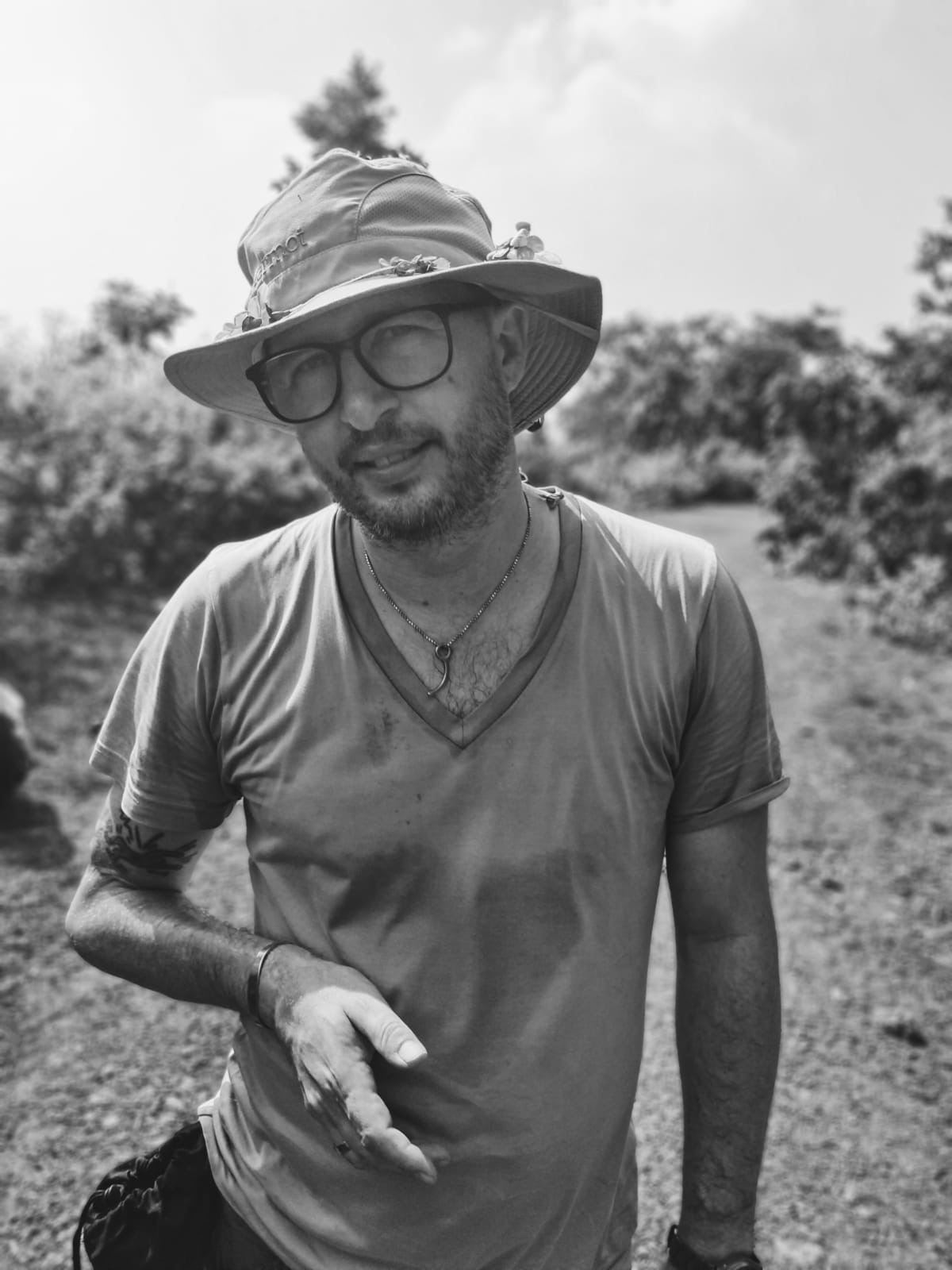
- Born: April 1977 (age 49); Germany
- Occupations: Cinematographer, Director
- Years active: 2002–present
- Awards: Webby Award Honoree (2021); Villa Aurora Fellow (2009)
- Website: wearem2.co

Max Penzel (born 1977) is a German cinematographer and director known for his work on feature films, documentaries, and commercials. A recipient of the Michael Ballhaus Award for emerging cinematographers, he has shot projects such as Strajk – Die Heldin von Danzig, Lights, and Tag 26. Penzel’s work has earned distinctions including the Bavarian Film Award, a nomination for the European Film Awards, and honours such as the German Design Award and the Grimme Award. Penzel currently resides in Singapore with his family.

== Education ==
Penzel studied cinematography at the Deutsche Film- und Fernsehakademie Berlin (DFFB) between 1999 and 2005, including a scholarship year at the Łódź Film School in Poland. Among his mentors were Volker Schlöndorff, Michael Ballhaus, and Sławomir Idziak.

== Career ==
Penzel’s early work included short films such as Tag 26 and The Date, with Tag 26 receiving the Grand Chameleon Award at the Brooklyn International Film Festival in 2003.

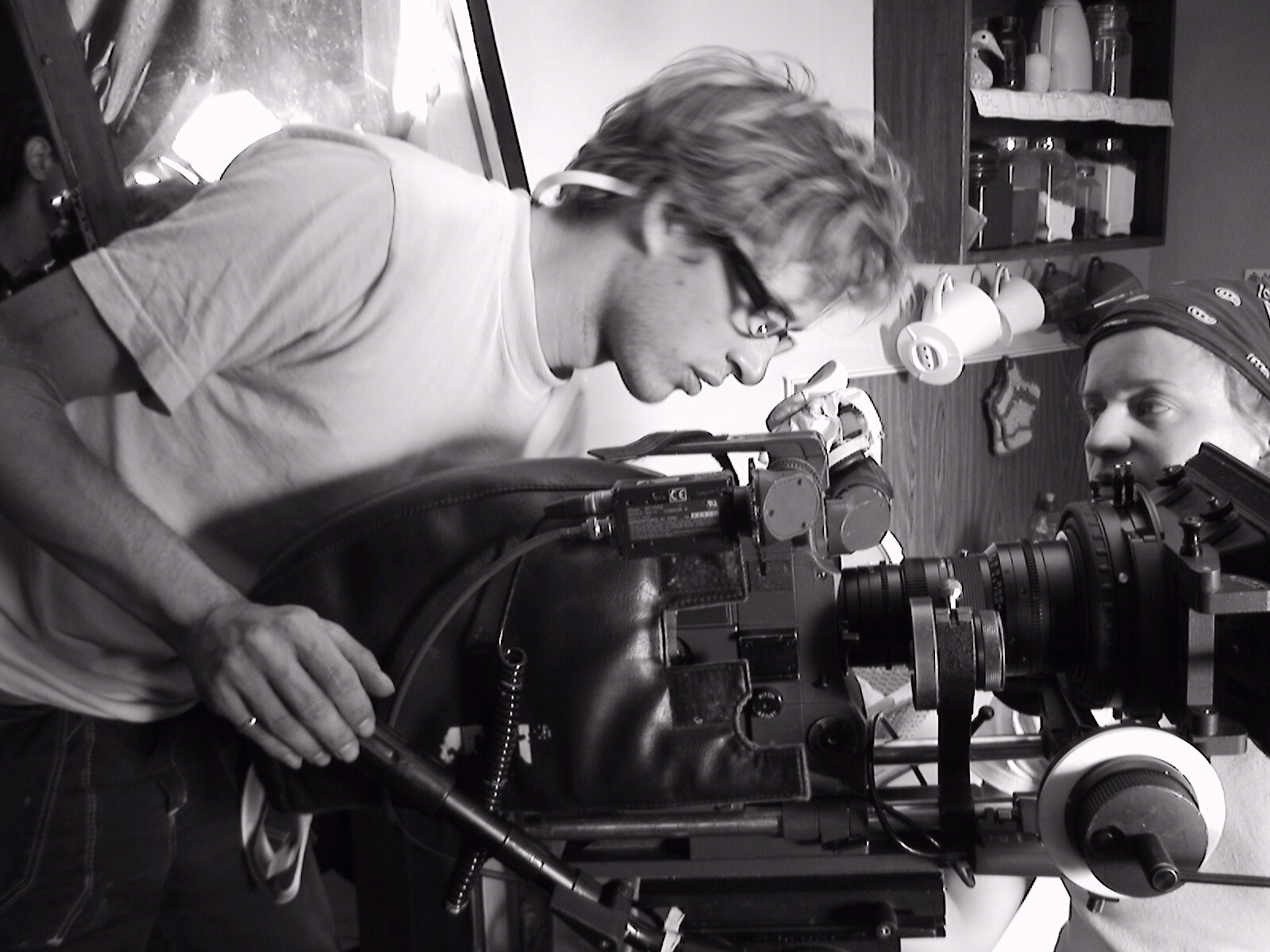
Max Penzel working as a cinematographer during the filming of Tag 26 (2002).

During his studies, he held a traineeship on Martin Scorsese’s Gangs of New York and collaborated with Volker Schlöndorff on the opera From the House of the Dead (2005).

In 2005 he received the Michael Ballhaus Award, followed by the Bavarian Film Award for Best Cinematography (2nd Unit) in 2007 for his work on Strajk – Die Heldin von Danzig. In 2009, he was awarded a Villa Aurora Fellowship by the German Foreign Ministry. As part of his fellowship, he developed a feature film screenplay and a visual concept for a music documentary during a residency in Los Angeles.

His later work has included serving as cinematographer on the feature documentary Paul Kalkbrenner – A Live Documentary (2010) and the Joyn mini-series Crews & Gangs (2019).

== Recognitions and awards ==
- The short film Tag 26 (2003), shot by Penzel, won the Grand Chameleon Award at the Brooklyn International Film Festival.
- In 2005, Penzel received the Michael Ballhaus Award for upcoming cinematographers.

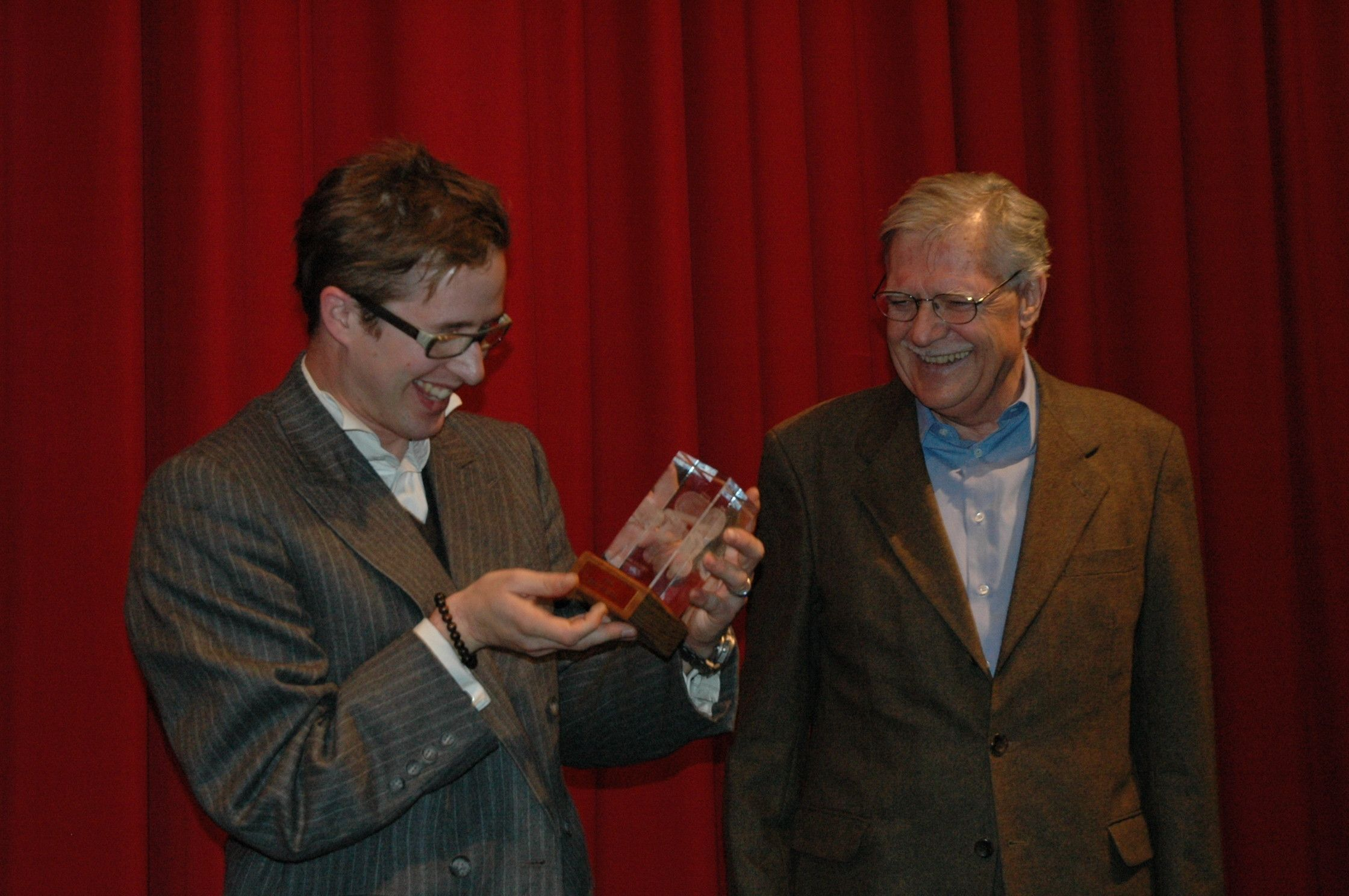
Max Penzel receiving the Ballhaus Preis, 2005.

- In the same year (2005), he was also honoured with the Grimme-Preis – Life Behind the Wall (Damals in der DDR).

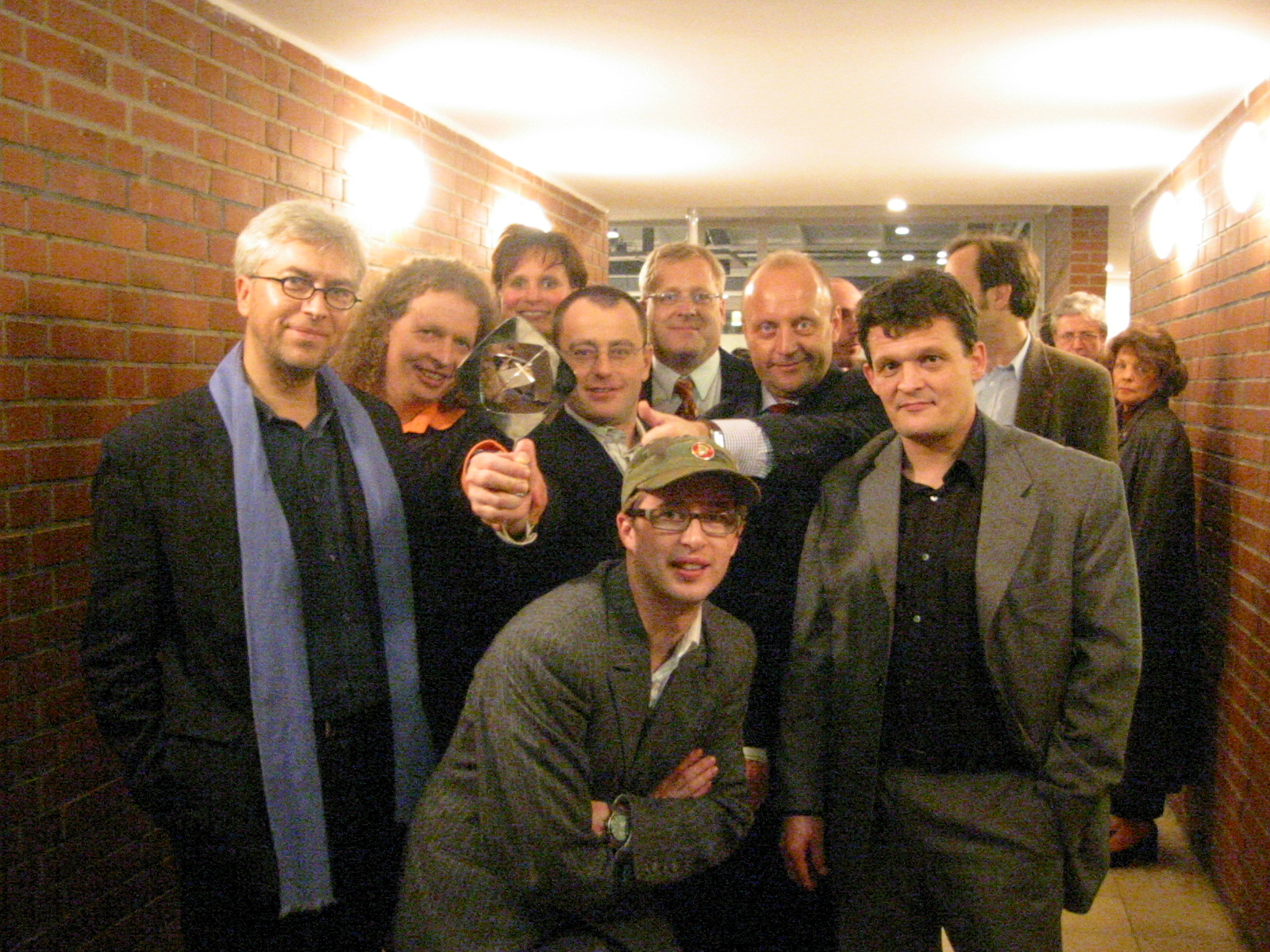
Max Penzel at the Grimme-Preis, 2005.

- He won the Bavarian Film Award for Best Cinematography (2nd unit) in 2007 for Strajk – Die Heldin von Danzig.
- In 2009, Penzel was awarded a Villa Aurora Fellowship in Los Angeles.
- Best Music Video (2010) – Sehsüchte Festival, Geboren im Winter.
- In 2010, Grand Prix and Best Short – Valladolid International Film Festival, Lights.
- European Film Awards nominee – Lights (European Short Film, 2010).
- Friedrich Wilhelm Murnau Award in 2010 (Murnau-Kurzfilmpreis) – The Date.
- DVD Gold/Platinum (2011–2016), [Paul Kalkbrenner – A Live Documentary].
- German Design Award (2012), BMW Zagato image film.
- Webby Award Honoree – UltraSuperNew Website (2021), Professional Services & Self-Promotion category.

== Work ==
Penzel has worked in more than 20 countries in Europe, Asia, and the Americas. He has contributed to commercials for companies including Nikon, BMW, Raiffeisen Bank, Adidas, and Mini, in collaboration with agencies such as Ogilvy & Mather, Jung von Matt, and TBWA.

He has directed music videos for:

- Udo Lindenberg – Hinterm Horizont
- Nena – Das ist nicht alles
- MIA – Was es ist, Verrückt, Geboren im Winter
- Scooter – David Doesn’t Eat, Behind the Cow
- Moderat – Rusty Nails

In addition, he has worked on stage productions as lighting and video designer, including collaborations with Greek director Ektoras Lygizos.

== Companies ==
Penzel is the founder of m-quadrat GmbH & Co KG (Germany) and m-quadrat Asia Pte Ltd (Singapore). He also serves as CEO of the creative agency Digital Disruptors and is co-founder of The MFTs, a Web3-based storytelling project.

== Selected filmography ==
=== First Unit Cinematography ===
- Crews & Gangs
- Paul Kalkbrenner – A Live Documentary
- Tag 26
- The Date
- Lights
- Gou Gou’s Autumn
- Life Behind the Wall
- Mystery Challenge
- Anomalya
- Der Blindgänger
- Menschenkörper

=== Second Unit Cinematography ===
- Cloud Atlas
- Hitman: Agent 47
- Global Player
- Strajk – Die Heldin von Danzig
- Whiskey mit Wodka
- Berlin Calling
- Cobra 11
- Beautiful Bitch
- The Ninth Day
