= Black Chariot =

- Directed by: Robert Goodwin
- Written by: Robert Goodwin
- Starring: Bernie Casey; Barbara O. Jones; Richard Elkins; Paulene Myers; Gene Dynarski
- Release date: June 1971
- Running time: 90 min.
- Country: United States
- Language: English

Black Chariot is a 1971 American blaxploitation drama film directed by Robert Goodwin and starring Bernie Casey, Barbara O. Jones, and Paulene Myers.

== Cast ==
- Bernie Casey as Tuck
- Barbara O. Jones as Organization activist and Tuck’s lover
- Richard Elkins as Leader of The Organization
- Paulene Myers as Tuck’s mother
- Gene Dynarski as White doctor
- Michael Warren (actor) as Tuck’s friend
