= Wilmington 10 – U.S.A. 10,000 =

- Directed by: Haile Gerima
- Cinematography: Skip Norman
- Release date: 1978
- Country: United States
- Language: English

Wilmington 10 – U.S.A. 10,000 is a 1979 documentary film directed by Haile Gerima.

== Plot ==
Wilmington 10 – USA 10,000 examines the impact of racism and the shortcomings of the criminal justice system by examining the history of the nine black men and one white woman who became known as the "Wilmington Ten."

The film was directed by Haile Gerima, with cinematography by Skip Norman.
