= Paulene Myers =

American actress (1913–1996)

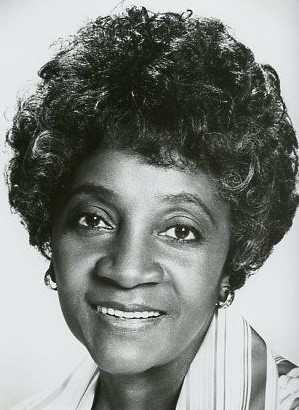
- Myers in 1976
- Born: Paulene Elenora Myers; November 9, 1913; Ocilla, Georgia, U.S.
- Died: December 8, 1996 (aged 83); Chester, Pennsylvania, U.S.
- Resting place: Chester Rural Cemetery
- Other names: Pauline Myers; Pauline Meyers
- Occupation: Actress
- Years active: 1938–1992

Paulene Elenora Myers (November 9, 1913 – December 8, 1996) was an American actress. Variations on the spelling of her name include Pauline Myers and Pauline Meyers. She was a pioneer among African–American actors who performed on Broadway stage and appeared on many television series throughout her long career. Myers' career spanned over six decades.

== Biography ==
=== Early life and career ===
Myers made her Broadway debut in 1933 in Growing Pains. She was also featured in Broadway and national companies of major productions such as A Member of the Wedding, Anna Lucasta, and The Blacks.

Myers also worked as a model for sculptors and painters.

=== Television roles ===
Among the many roles she played, some of her most notable were Mrs. Ward on the NBC-TV daytime soap opera Days of Our Lives, and Judge Pittman, the star of a TV special, "I'll See You in Court;" Judge Morrisey from the ABC-TV soap General Hospital, and a guest appearance as Judge Frances Mackenzie in an episode of All in the Family titled "Archie's Civil Rights", and Grandma Jane on the CBS variety/comedy series The Tony Orlando & Dawn Show. Myers also appeared with fellow veteran black actor Richard Ward as Grandpa Evans's new ladyfriend, Lena, on the CBS sitcom series Good Times, as well as roles on Sanford and Son, Kolchak: The Night Stalker, Mannix, The San Pedro Beach Bums, The Cosby Show, The Jeffersons, and Gunsmoke.

== Personal life and death ==
Myers lived in both Southern California for 23 years, and then in New York City for 12 years, and eventually settled in Chester, Pennsylvania, for the final two years of her life. She was interred in Chester Rural Cemetery.

== Partial filmography ==
- Boomerang (1947) - Maid (uncredited)
- Something of Value (1957) - Kikuyu Woman (uncredited)
- Tarzan's Fight for Life (1958) - Native Mother (uncredited)
- How to Make a Monster (1958) - Millie - the pedestrian
- Take a Giant Step (1959) - Violet
- All the Fine Young Cannibals (1960) - Nurse (uncredited)
- To Kill a Mockingbird (1962) - Jesse - Dubose Servant Girl (uncredited)
- Honeymoon Hotel (1964) - Hogan - Ross's Secretary
- Shock Treatment (1964) - Dr. Walden
- Fate Is the Hunter (1964) - Mother (uncredited)
- Dear Heart (1964) - Florist
- I'll Take Sweden (1965) - Eloise (uncredited)
- The Third Day (1965) - Hannah - the Maid (uncredited)
- Fitzwilly (1967) - Oberblatz' Secretary (uncredited)
- Winning (1969) - Cleaning Woman (uncredited)
- The Lost Man (1969) - Grandma
- The Comic (1969) - Phoebe
- ...tick...tick...tick... (1970) - Mrs. Harley
- Black Chariot (1971)
- La cavale (1971)
- Lady Sings the Blues (1972) - Mrs. Edson
- Maurie (1973) - Rosie
- The Sting (1973) - Alva Coleman
- Lost in the Stars (1974) - Grace Kumalo
- Kolchak (1974, TV Series) - Mamalois Edmonds
- The Jeffersons (1975, TV Series) - Diane Stockwell
- Armaguedon (1977)
- Bloodbrothers (1978) - Mrs. Pitt
- Deux (1989) - Nina Walkowicz
- My Cousin Vinny (1992) - Constance Riley
