= Barbara O. Jones =

American actress (1941–2024)

- Born: Barbara Olivia Minor; December 12, 1941; Dayton, Ohio, U.S.
- Died: April 16, 2024 (aged 82); Dayton, Ohio, U.S.
- Other names: Barbarao; Barbara-O; Barbara O
- Occupation: Actress
- Spouse(s): William Jones (m. 1957; div. 19??); Robert Earl Price (m. 1971; div. or died ??)
- Children: 3

Barbara Olivia Jones (December 1941 – April 16, 2024), also known as Barbarao, Barbara-O, and Barbara O., was an American actress from Ohio best known for her work in the films of the L.A. Rebellion movement of 1970s black filmmakers, starring in films by Haile Gerima and Julie Dash. She also appeared on television alongside Muhammad Ali in Freedom Road and had smaller roles in other films including Demon Seed and on television.

== Early life ==
Barbara Olivia Minor was born in Dayton, Ohio, in December 1941. She attended Roosevelt High School. Her mother, Alberta, was a business teacher at Roosevelt High School. Prior to becoming an actress, Barbara was also a radio personality who went by the name Bobbie Montgomery on Dayton's radio station WDAO in the late 1960s before going to California.

== L.A. Rebellion ==
Jones appeared in a number of films by the new generation of young black filmmakers studying at UCLA in California. For Haile Gerima she starred in his student short Child of Resistance (1973), playing an imprisoned activist, and his feature debut Bush Mama (1979), both made at UCLA. In Bush Mama she plays the wife of an imprisoned Vietnam veteran who becomes radicalized by poverty and oppression.

After an appearance in Julie Dash's student short Diary of an African Nun (1977) she starred in Dash's first feature Daughters of the Dust (1991), where she plays Yellow Mary, an economically independent woman who returns to her home in South Carolina's Gullah community around 1900, accompanied by her female lover.

== Other work ==
Her first film role was starring in Robert L. Goodwin's black crime film Black Chariot (1971). Goodwin raised the finance for the film independently from the black community, raising many small donations including $5000 in grocery-store Blue Chip Stamps. She had a small role in Donald Cammell's science fiction/horror movie Demon Seed (1977).

In 1979 she appeared alongside boxer Muhammad Ali in the TV miniseries Freedom Road. Ali, in one of his few acting roles, played Gideon Jackson, an ex-slave elected to the U.S. Senate, and she played his wife.

In 1999 she had a lead role in Patrice Mallard's Mute Love, which draws on a number of elements from Daughters of the Dust. In 2001 she starred in Martin Mhando and Ron Mulvihill's film Maangamizi: The Ancient One, playing Asira, an American woman doctor visiting Tanzania. She also had guest roles in TV shows including Laverne & Shirley, Wonder Woman, and Lou Grant.

== Personal life and death ==
Jones was married twice. Her first marriage, at 16, was to William Jones, her high school sweetheart, in 1957; they had two children together, William "Mshinda" and Gina "Makini", before they divorced. Her second marriage was to Robert Earl “Bashiri” Price, in 1971. They had one child together, Dhati, and raised all three of her children together.

Jones died at her home in Dayton on April 16, 2024, at age 82.
