= Aethiops =

The terms Aethiops, Ethiop, or Ethiope are archaic words for "burnt face". It may refer to:

- Aethiopia, an ancient term for Sub-Saharan Africa
- Æthiops mineral, a form of cinnabar
- Black people in Ancient Roman history
- Ethiops martial, or wüstite, a mineral
- People of Ethiopia

== See also ==
- Aethiopis, a lost epic of ancient Greek literature
- Ethiopia (disambiguation)
