= Michael Warren (actor) =

American basketball player and actor

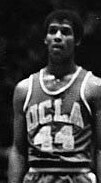
- Warren with the UCLA Bruins in 1967
- Born: Michael Warren; South Bend, Indiana, U.S.
- Years active: 1970–2019
- Notable work: Officer Bobby Hill in Hill Street Blues; Ron Harris in City of Angels (TV series); Baron Marks in Soul Food (TV series)
- Spouse(s): Jenny Palacios; Sue Narramore (Divorced)
- Children: 4
- Basketball career

Personal information
- Listed height: 5 ft 11 in (1.80 m)
- Listed weight: 155 lb (70 kg)

Career information
- High school: South Bend Central (South Bend, Indiana)
- College: UCLA (1965–1968)
- NBA draft: 1968: 14th round, 173rd overall pick
- Drafted by: Seattle SuperSonics
- Position: Guard

Career highlights
- 2× NCAA champion (1967, 1968); First-team All-American (1968) – USBWA; First-team All-AAWU (1968); 2× Second-team All-AAWU (1966, 1967)
- Stats at Basketball Reference

Lloyd Michael Warren is an American retired television actor and former college basketball player, who played Officer Bobby Hill on the NBC television series Hill Street Blues. He played basketball for the UCLA Bruins, winning two national titles (1967, 1968) and earning first-team All-American honors.

== Early life ==
Warren was born and raised in South Bend, Indiana, the son of Ellen and Grayson Warren. He attended Central High School, where as a senior he was class president. He was twice named to the Indiana all-state team. He graduated in 1964 as Bears' career, season, and single-game scoring leader. In 1992, he was inducted into the Indiana Basketball Hall of Fame.

== College basketball career ==
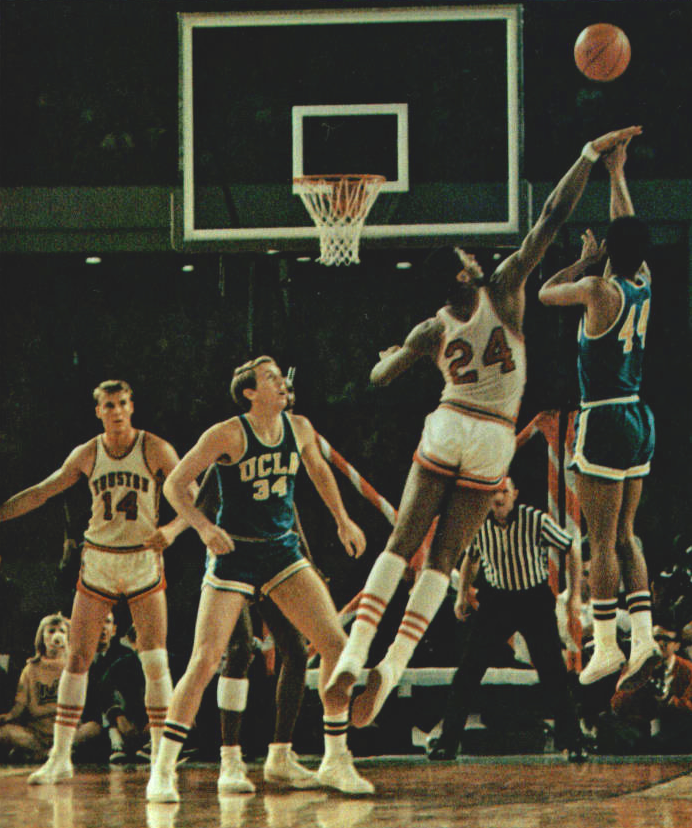
Warren shoots the ball in the Game of the Century in 1968

Warren played college basketball at UCLA, where he was a three-year varsity letterman and starting guard from 1966 to 1968. Led by Lew Alcindor, the Bruins posted records of 30–0 in 1967 and 29–1 in 1968. Both teams, coached by legendary coach John Wooden, captured the NCAA national championship. Warren, the smallest Bruins starter at 5 ft 11 in (1.80 m), averaged 12.4 points as a junior in 1967. He was named to the NCAA All-Tournament team and was an All-American in 1968, one of three on that UCLA team along with Alcindor and guard Lucius Allen. The team is considered one of the best in college basketball history. Warren also earned the award as the Bruins' best defender in 1966, and he won the award as the Bruins' best "team player" in 1967 and 1968. Warren was inducted into the UCLA Athletics Hall of Fame.

Warren was drafted in the 14th round (173rd overall) of the 1968 NBA Draft by the Seattle SuperSonics. But he was released during the exhibition season. He later signed with the Los Angeles Stars of the ABA, but was again released in the pre-season. Warren is quoted as saying "At 22 I was a washed-up ballplayer".

== Acting career ==
Warren would go on to work as an actor in television. In addition to his starring role on Hill Street Blues, he had an earlier role on The White Shadow, a co-starring role on the CBS series City of Angels, a recurring role on the Showtime series Soul Food, and as a guest star as Jason on Marcus Welby, M.D.

In 1971, he appeared as basketball player Easly in Drive, He Said, directed by Jack Nicholson, and in Black Chariot as a young activist alongside Bernie Casey. Then in the film adaptation of Butterflies Are Free (1972), where he played a store owner named Roy. In 1974, he played the role of park ranger P. J. Lewis on the NBC adventure series Sierra, and went on to play a rookie officer for a possible backdoor pilot during the final 1975 season of Adam-12. His film work includes Norman... Is That You? (1976) with Redd Foxx and Pearl Bailey. In 1979, he starred as police officer Willie Miller on the CBS crime drama Paris, the first effort by Hill Street Blues executive producer Steven Bochco.

He guest starred in In the House opposite LL Cool J as Debbie Allen's ex-husband. He also guest starred on the Fox sitcom Living Single as Khadijah's father, and later portrayed Joan's father on the UPN/CW sitcom Girlfriends.

Warren played Darrin Dewitt Henson's boss on the Showtime show Soul Food, in which he played hustler-turned-entrepreneur Baron Marks. He had a recurring role on the ABC Family series Lincoln Heights as Spencer Sutton, Eddie's father.

He played Pete Bancroft in the Tales from the Darkside episode, "Satanic Piano" (1985). Warren appeared as Virgil Tibbs' former longtime police partner and friend, Matthew Pogue on In the Heat of the Night episode "The Hammer and the Glove", which aired in 1988.

In 1996, he was on the Early Edition episode Hoops. He played Wells in the Sliders episode (5/8) "Java Jive" (1999).

In 2001, he played Officer William Henderson in an episode of TV series The District, entitled "The Project". In 2002, he appeared in "Normal Again", an episode of Buffy the Vampire Slayer, as a psychiatrist trying to convince Buffy Summers she is delusional.

In 2010, Warren appeared in the independent film Anderson's Cross playing the father of the lead character Nick Anderson.

== Personal life ==
In 1974, Warren married Sue Narramore, with whom he had a daughter and a son:

1. Kekoa Brianna "Koa" Warren
2. Cash Garner Warren. (m. Jessica Alba 2008–2025)

Through Cash, Warren was the father-in-law of American actress Jessica Alba until the couple announced their divorce in early 2025.

After his first marriage ended in divorce, Warren married Jenny Palacios, with whom he also had a daughter and a son:

1. Makayla
2. Grayson Andres

== Honours ==
- USBWA first-team All-American (1968)
- First-team All-AAWU (1968)
- Second-team All-AAWU (1966, 1967)
- Pac-12 Conference Hall of Honor inductee (2009)
- UCLA Athletics Hall of Fame (1990)
- Indiana Basketball Hall of Fame (1992)
