= Wilmington Ten =

Group of wrongfully convicted American prisoners

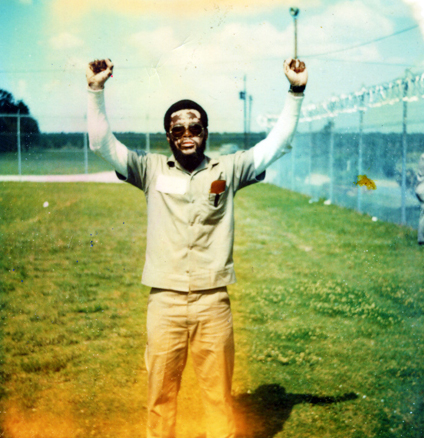
Jerry Jacobs, one of the Wilmington Ten, in prison, June 1976.

The Wilmington Ten were nine young men and a woman who were wrongfully convicted in 1971 in Wilmington, North Carolina, United States, of arson and conspiracy. Most were sentenced to 29 years in prison, and all ten served nearly a decade in jail before an appeal won their release. The case became an international cause célèbre, in which many critics of the city and state characterized the activists as political prisoners.

Amnesty International took up the case in 1976 and provided legal defense counsel to appeal the convictions. In 1978, Governor Jim Hunt reduced the sentences of the ten defendants. In Chavis v. State of North Carolina, 637 F.2d 213 (4th Cir., 1980), the convictions were overturned by the federal appeals court on the grounds that the prosecutor and the trial judge had both violated the defendants' constitutional rights. They were not retried. In 2012, the Wilmington Ten, including four who had already died, were pardoned by Governor Bev Perdue.

== Background ==
In the 1960s and 1970s, black residents of Wilmington, North Carolina were dissatisfied with the lack of progress in implementing integration and other civil rights reforms achieved by the American Civil Rights Movement through congressional passage of civil rights legislation in 1964 and 1965. Many struggled with poverty and lack of opportunity. Despair at the 1968 assassination of Martin Luther King Jr. increased racial tensions, with a rise in violence, including the arson of several white-owned businesses.

Tension increased further after the 1969 racial integration of Wilmington high schools. The city chose to close the black Williston Industrial High School, a source of community pride. It laid off black teachers, principals, and coaches, transferring students among white-majority schools. Several clashes between white and black students resulted in a number of arrests and expulsions.

On Martin Luther King Jr.’s birthday, January 15, 1971, a delegation of Black students at John T. Hoggard High School requested a memorial. The principal refused, and students began a boycott at Hoggard as well as New Hanover High School in response. On January 27, students asked Rev. Eugene Templeton from Gregory Congregational Church to use the space for meetings. As tensions escalated, the church became a safe haven and a gathering place.

In February, the United Church of Christ sent then-23-year-old Benjamin Chavis, from their Commission for Racial Justice, to Wilmington to try to calm the situation and work with the students. Chavis, who had once worked as an assistant to King, preached non-violence and met with students regularly at Gregory Congregational Church to discuss black history, as well as to organize the boycott.

In response to tensions, members of a Ku Klux Klan chapter and other white supremacist groups began patrolling the streets. They hung an effigy of the white superintendent of the schools and cut his phone lines. Street violence broke out between them and black men.

Violence continued to escalate, as a crowd of white vigilantes shot Rev. David Vaughn with buckshot outside Gregory Church on February 3, 1971. As the white vigilantes stepped up their attacks, an armed cadre joined the students. Firebombings occurred across the city, with 20 buildings going up in flames between February 5 and the end of the month.

== Arson at Mike's Grocery and trial ==
On February 6, 1971, Mike's Grocery, a white-owned business, was firebombed. Firefighters responding to the fire said they were shot at by snipers from the roof of the nearby Gregory Congregational Church. Responding police officers returned fire and killed a black teenager named Steven Corbett, who was allegedly holding a gun. Chavis and several students had been meeting at the church, which also held other people. The neighborhood erupted in rioting that lasted through the next day, in which two people died.

The North Carolina governor called up the North Carolina National Guard, whose forces entered the church on February 8 and removed the suspects. The Guard claimed to have found ammunition in the building. The violence resulted in two deaths, six injuries, and more than $500,000 (equivalent to $4 million in 2025) in property damage.

Chavis and nine others, eight young black men who were high school students, and an older, white, female anti-poverty worker, were arrested on charges of arson related to the grocery fire. Based on testimony of two black men, they were tried and convicted in state court of arson and conspiracy in connection with the firebombing of Mike's Grocery.

The "Ten" and their sentences:

- Benjamin Chavis (age 24) – 34 years
- Connie Tindall (age 21) – 31 years
- Marvin "Chilly" Patrick (age 19) – 29 years
- Wayne Moore (age 19) – 29 years
- Reginald Epps (age 18) – 28 years
- Jerry Jacobs (age 19) – 29 years
- James "Bun" McKoy (age 19) – 29 years
- Willie Earl Vereen (age 18) – 29 years
- William "Joe" Wright Jr. (age 19) – 29 years
- Anne Sheppard Turner (age 35) – 15 years

== Trial and sentencing ==
At the time, the state's case against the Wilmington Ten was seen as controversial both in the state of North Carolina and in the United States. One witness testified that he was given a minibike in exchange for his testimony against the group. Another witness, Allen Hall, had a history of mental illness and had to be removed from the courthouse since he recanted on the stand under cross-examination.

Each of the ten defendants was convicted of the charges. The men's sentences ranged from 29 years to 34 years for arson, which was considered severe punishment for a fire in which no one had died. Anne Sheppard Turner of Auburn, New York, 35, received 15 years as an accessory before the fact and conspiracy to assault emergency personnel. The youngest of the group, Earl Vereen, was 18 years old at the time of his sentencing. Reverend Chavis was the oldest of the men, at 24.

== International response ==
Several national magazines, including Time, Newsweek, Sepia and The New York Times Magazine, published articles in the late 1970s on the trial and its aftermath. When then President Jimmy Carter admonished the Soviet Union in 1978 for holding political prisoners, the Soviets cited the Wilmington Ten as an example of American political imprisonment.

== Appeals ==
Amnesty International took on the Wilmington Ten case in 1976. They classified the eight men still in prison as among 11 black men incarcerated in the U.S. who were considered to be political prisoners, under the definition in the 1948 Universal Declaration of Human Rights.

In 1976 and 1977, three key prosecution witnesses recanted their testimony. In 1977 60 Minutes aired a special about the case, suggesting that the evidence against the Wilmington Ten was fabricated. In 1978, the New York Times reporter Wayne King published an investigatory article; based on testimony of a witness whose anonymity he protected, he said that perhaps the prosecution had framed a guilty man, as his source said that he had committed the crimes at the behest of Chavis.

In 1977, Turner was released on parole. In 1978 Governor Jim Hunt reduced the sentences of the nine defendants who were still in prison. The commutations allowed of the other defendants to be paroled. Chavis was paroled last in December 1979.

In Chavis v. State of North Carolina, 637 F.2d 213 (4th Cir. 1980), the federal 4th Circuit Court of Appeals overturned the convictions, as it determined that: (1) the prosecutor failed to disclose exculpatory evidence, in violation of the defendants' due process rights (the Brady disclosure); and (2) the trial judge erred by limiting the cross-examination of key prosecution witnesses about special treatment the witnesses received in connection with their testimony, in violation of the defendants' Sixth Amendment right to confront the witnesses against them. It ordered a new trial, but the state chose not to prosecute again. Chavis and the other seven prisoners were released.

A group called the Wilmington Ten Foundation for Social Justice was established to work to improve conditions in the city.

== Pardon ==
In May 2012, Benjamin Chavis and six surviving members of the group petitioned North Carolina governor Bev Perdue for a pardon. The NAACP supported the pardon, as well as arguing for compensation to be paid to the men and their survivors for their years in jail. On December 22, 2012 The New York Times published an editorial titled, "Pardons for the Wilmington Ten", that urged Governor Perdue to "finally pardon" the group of civil rights activists.

Perdue granted a pardon of innocence for each of the ten on December 31, 2012. The pardon qualified each of the ten to state compensation of $50,000 per year of incarceration.

The claims were approved by the North Carolina Industrial Commission and signed off on by the North Carolina Attorney General Roy Cooper's office in May 2013. Total compensation was $1,113,605: Ben Chavis received $244,470 (equivalent to $338,000 in 2025), Marvin Patrick received $187,984 (equivalent to $260,000 in 2025), with most of the remaining rewards being $175,000 each (equivalent to $242,000 in 2025). As four of the Wilmington Ten were deceased before the December 2012 pardons, their families received no compensation. As of February 2014, a case was pending before the NC Industrial Commission, seeking that compensation be awarded to the families of the four deceased: Jerry Jacobs (d. 1989), Joe Wright (d. 1991), Anne Sheppard Turner (d. 2011), and Connie Tindall (d. 2012).

== Representation in other media ==
Films

- Wilmington 10 – U.S.A. 10,000, a 1979 documentary film directed by Haile Gerima
- In 2003, University of North Carolina Wilmington student Lauryn Colatuno made the documentary film The Wilmington Ten: A Story Retold
- In 2009, Francine DeCoursey was developing the documentary film The Wilmington Ten: Justice Denied … Justice Interrupted …
- In 2014, the National Newspaper Publishers Association and CashWorks HD Productions produced the documentary film Pardons of Innocence: The Wilmington Ten

Books

- Dr. Kenneth Janken, The Wilmington Ten: Violence, Injustice, and the Rise of Black Politics in the 1970s
- Larry Reni Thomas, Rabbit! Rabbit! Rabbit!: A Fictional Account of the Wilmington Ten Incident of 1971
