= Teza (film) =

2008 Ethiopian film

- Poster
- Directed by: Haile Gerima
- Written by: Haile Gerima
- Produced by: Philippe Avril; Karl Baumgartner; Marie-Michèlegravele Cattelain; Haile Gerima
- Cinematography: Mario Masini
- Edited by: Haile Gerima; Loren Hankin
- Music by: Vijay Iyer; Jorga Mesfin
- Distributed by: Mypheduh Films (US)
- Release date: 2008
- Running time: 140 minutes
- Countries: Ethiopia; Germany; France
- Languages: Amharic; English; German

Teza (Amharic: ጤዛ Ṭeza, "Dew") is a 2008 Ethiopian drama film about the Derg period in Ethiopia, directed and written by Haile Gerima. Teza won the top award, the Golden Stallion, at the 2009 Panafrican Film and Television Festival of Ouagadougou.

== Plot ==
The film follows the story of the protagonist, Anbeber – who is a highly educated lab researcher who returns to his village in the Ethiopian countryside after a long absence, during which he lived in Germany and the capital city of Ethiopia. The story is not structured chronologically. It opens with a sequence that rapidly crosscuts between shots of a chanting priest who is shrouded in sheer muslin fabrics and a badly injured man being wheeled down hospital corridors on a stretcher. There is also an image of a child that appears multiple times during this opening sequence; it becomes clear later on in the film that this child is a visual hallucination. The priest is ordering someone to wake up and get up. Then there is a shot of a village with a vast landscape is shown. There is a priest playing a traditional harp at the edge of a cliff while watching the sunrise. An elder woman (later revealed to be Anberber's mother) is sitting by wood fire in a tiny mud hut wondering if the direction of the smoke indicates an imminent arrival.

It is 1990 and Anberber has returned to his poor village located far away from the metropolis of the country. He is greeted warmly by his mother and his brother. But he looks dazed and disoriented. A group of dejected young men in handcuffs look on as the family reunites. A very crowded and vibrant party is thrown to welcome Anberber. He is bombarded by questions from well-meaning party guests, but he simply stares back at them in confused shock. Soon the festivities are interrupted when a young man is violently drafted to fight on behalf of the national government. Other young men can be seen discretely sneaking out of the party before they are also spotted.

At sunrise, there is a mesmerizing view of lake Tana and a canoe floating near the horizon. Anberber wakes up screaming. Seemingly the whole village gathers outside his hut to stare at him. Anberber has on prosthetic leg but admits that he has no memory of losing his leg. After following his mother - who is visiting a church to give thanks for his return - Anberber walks into the church with shoes on (something that forbidden in the Ethiopian Orthodox tradition). Everyone is scandalized and shouting at him to take off his shoes. However, he is too unsettled by his hallucination of the child to even processes what they are saying to him. By now, people of the village are convinced that Anberber is possessed by evil spirits – probably as a result of having gone abroad, to a foreign country. Anberber follows his “vision” of the child to a statue erected by Mussolini's regime, during the Italian invasion. Anberber remembers his father who lost his life fighting the Italians. There is another sunrise and another beautiful view of lake Tana. Fog rises out of the ground as children run to school. The village teacher comes to school riding a bike. Class commences with the children being thought the national anthem.

A young man working on a farm is ambushed by soldiers and drafted. His mother is distraught. Anberber tries to console her. Anberber is unsettled by how things have changed in his village. He bitterly questions the point of educating the young children when all they have to look forward to is war and death. But the teacher counters Anberber's disillusionment by stating the power of education, especially in repressive times like this.

Anberber wakes up screaming once again after getting a series of flashbacks. He goes to the shore of lake Tana to stare at the horizon. He remarks how that horizon used to be the edge of his world as a child. But now, he has no recollection of where he had been in the intervening years. The people of the village bring him patients to treat because they heard he was a doctor. Yet he remains as quiet and as confused as the beginning of the film.

Anberber talks to his hallucination out loud in the presence of his mother. She becomes even more alarmed and worried about him. The family decides he needs to be taken to a holy water bath as part of an exorcism ritual. Anberber does not fight them but he tells the priest that the ritual will not work because his mind has been locked. The priest comments that even Western medicine will not be effective if the patient does not believe in its efficacy. As soon as the holy water is splashed on him, his first memory of his past life comes back to him.

It is 1970 and young Anberber is living in Germany as a graduate student. At a party, he meets Cassandra – a Black woman, who accuses Ethiopians of not wanting to date dark-skinned women. He disagrees and tells her he is interested in her. He goes on to declare himself a socialist, whose research work is motivated by his desire to alleviate the suffering of poor people in his country. Back in the present day, the liberation fighters warring with the government have come into the village with rifles. They are asking the people to tell them about their poor living conditions under the current government. The village people are terrified to say anything at all. As the flashback to early 1970s continues, Anberber participates in a political meeting of socialist Ethiopian students, who are all studying in Germany. In the present day, he simply stares at the liberation fighters in a daze when they ask him political questions. Later on, he compares the liberation fighters with communist government that was in power at the time; they both claim to be for the people but the people's lives have barely changed.

The village teacher takes Anberber to the cave where all the young men of the village are hiding in order to avoid conscription. On another day, soldiers are tipped off about a young man visiting from the cave. They chase and kill him in front of the villagers. Anberber tries to stop them but he does not succeed. To Anberber, the murdered young man now blends with his hallucination of the child. He tells his mother that the soldiers killed his childhood and his memories when they killed the young man.

Anberber is taken to another exorcism session, where another set of his memories come back to him. Cassandra is now Anberber's girlfriend. His best friend – Tesfaye – and his White German girlfriend announce they are pregnant. Cassandra gets upset. It is later revealed that her own father was a Cameroonian man who had a child with a White German woman. Her father was eventually deported by the German government. Her mother struggled to cope with the racism and committed suicide. Cassandra had to grow up, not only with the sense of abandonment, but the racism without the support of either parent. She fears Tesfaye will not stick out to raise his child as well. In the present day, Anberber watches Azanu washing up in Lake Tana. She is a scorned woman who had been taken in by his mother. The film crosscuts between the two women multiple times. Anberber's brother tries to rape Azanu. She calls out for help. When people arrive, they all blame her rather than the brother – that is, everyone except for Anberber, who is furious on her behalf.

Back in the 1970s, at another student meeting, a more radical member in the group criticizes another female member for buying into imperialist ways of being because of the way the woman was dressed. Present day Anberber reflects on his youthful infatuation with the anti-imperialist socialist movement as the magic solution to Ethiopia's problems. In present day, the men of the village have arranged for Anberber to consider a young teenage girl for marriage because they are worried he is falling for Azanu, the scorned woman. Anberber is disgusted by their suggestion.

It is 1974 and the Ethiopian students have gathered in a bar to celebrate the deposition of Emperor Haile Selassie. The leftist White Germans who are gathered with them also cheer as one of the most prominent Black Monarchs in history is brought down. The Ethiopian students start discussing the idea of going back to their country to work for the people. Cassandra is pregnant but she hasn't told Anberber, fearing he might not stick around to raise his kid. As the others celebrate the fall of the monarchy, Anberber is more somber, wondering who would be able to fill the power vacuum that has been created and if the next government would be any better.

Tesfaye has finally decided to leave his kid behind in Germany to work under the new communist government. Anberber criticizes Tesfaye for abandoning his child, citing Cassandra's experience. Tesfaye then retorts by revealing Cassandra's secret abortion to Anberber. Cassandra eventually disappears because she is convinced Anberber will also not stay in Germany for too long. Back in the present, Azanu is singing about finding love again while she canoes across lake Tana. Anberber and Azanu consummate their love.

Anberber walks into his bedroom to find his brother going through his suitcases, which is full of books. His brother is disappointed in Anberber for not lifting the family out of poverty, despite all his education. He says they cannot eat books.

It is now the 1980s Anberber has also finally returned to Addis Ababa as a PhD holder. He encounters soldiers stationed throughout the airport as soon as he arrives to Ethiopia. Anberber wants to return to his village to visit his mother but he is told the conditions in the country are too unstable for travel and that he is urgently needed to work as a pathologist. Despite all this, Tesfaye and Anberber feel optimistic about all they will be able to do for the poor people of Ethiopia. But as time goes on, the two increasingly clash with the government cadres, who accuse them of being elitist intellectuals who are do not support the revolution.

Anberber witnesses a military raid for the first time and is horrified by level of brutality that has become commonplace under the current regime. He and his companions comment on how they now live in luxury houses that the government has confiscated from people as a way to reduce wealth inequality. That is, they recognize the paradox of being radical leftists who also benefit from luxuries that the new system has afforded them.

Then one of Anberber's close friends, who returned to Ethiopia around the same time as him is murdered right in front of Anberber because some opposing political group suspected him of working with the government. By this point Anberber is trying to distance himself from politics. However, that makes the cadres even more furious because they think he believes he is better than them. One day, the cadres want him to sign saying that a murder they committed was an accident. He tells them he is a PhD holder not a medical doctor. The blood dripping from the murdered man then morphs into the leaky faucet in Anberber's bathroom, which haunts him all night long. On another day, Anberber becomes furious at the cadres for missing work in order to attend a revolutionary meeting. He gets accused of being an imperialist and anti-revolution. He struggles to accept this accusation and refuses to engage in the communist practice of self-criticism. He is eventually forced to self-criticize.

Tesfaye reveals he is planning to not return to Ethiopia after leaves for an upcoming work trip to Germany. He is frustrated by his inability to bring about any real change under the current political conditions. He finally wants to settle down and help raise the son he abandoned years earlier. But before he could return, the cadres – who had increasingly started to resent him – beat him to death. They also come for Anberber, but he narrowly escapes. Anberber is then asked to go to Germany on Tesfaye's behalf. While there, he struggles to fit back in with the Ethiopian diaspora living there. They think he is working as a spy for the Ethiopian government, so they do not trust him. Besides, they resent him because they think their lives as immigrants living in Europe is much harder than his. When he finally meets with Tesfaye's son and wife. The son is really struggling with the racism around him, now that he is a teenager. He is angry at his mother because she does not understand his experience of racism. He longs for his father so much that Anberber cannot bring himself to tell them about Tesfaye's death. Eventually Anberber musters the courage to share the sad news, but before he could meet them again, he is beaten up by a racist German mob, who eventually throw him out of the window. He is injured very seriously and loses his leg.

Back in present day, after witnessing one of the conscripts coming back from the front badly injured, he realizes that he may never fully remember or understand what happened to him when he was away. But, he could not just sit idly waiting for more clarity; it is more pressing to be of service to the community to the best of his ability. He helps dress the wound of the returned soldier. Then, the villagers bring him teacher's bike. They report that the teacher has disappeared, and they choose him to be the new schoolteacher for the village.

Azanu is pregnant. This time, Anberber knows about it (unlike when Cassandra was pregnant) and is excited. But when he tries to focus on her pregnant belly, the voices in his head get louder. Eventually the “vision” – which he was previously getting glimpses of through his dreams – becomes clear. There is a traditional grain bin. It has many holes that are rapidly leaking grain. Anberber is panicking and trying to fill all the holes with crumpled up paper that he tears off of his books. But it is all futile because the sea of grain eventually swallows him. The priest interprets this vision/dream for Anberber. The grain bin represents country. The grain represents the people who are dying like flies. The constant leakage is the county's chronic problems that are seemingly unsolvable. The priest believes that Anberber is finding his education useless in bringing about the kind of changes he wanted to see in his country.

A radio interview with the liberation fighters is being broadcast by a foreign radio channel. The fighters are convinced that their version of socialism is the purest compared to the current government's.

As Azanu prepares to give birth, Anberber settles into his new role as the village teacher. He finally seems lucid enough for job and finds joy in teaching the children how to ride the bike. By the end of the film, Azanu gives birth to baby at the turn of the year, just as the New Year song is being sang and the indigenous yellow flowers of New Year blooms. The film ends with hope for this new generation, who will reject the violence of previous governments and bring about a rebirth of the country.

== Production ==
According to the director, Haile Gerima, who is also the executive producer and writer, Teza took 14 years to make. The writing underwent changes during those years, maturing and blossoming, benefitting from the Director writers introspection and reflection. Teza's scheduling, especially its Germany shoot had to undergo radical change due to funding issues which cut the scheduled 3 week shoot to 10 days. There was a 2-year gap between the wrap of shooting in Ethiopia in August 2004 and the beginning of the German shooting in November 2006.

In an especially intense scene, Actors Aaron Arefayne (Anberber) and Abeye Tedla (Tesfaye) confronting a Marxist tribunal, were so deeply immersed in character that Arefayne burst a blood vessel in his right eye causing production to halt. The director sent the actors home to rest, the next day Arefayne's eye was completely covered in a film of blood. The production schedule would not permit any more breaks and the director was obliged to continue shooting. There were other challenges, some epic, some humorous. All in all, the director, cast and crew were able to overcome the many challenges to deliver a film that resonated with an important message that audiences from Italy to Dubai responded to with enthusiasm as reflected in its nominations and awards.

== Reception ==
Teza has been able to achieve an amazing cross over popularity, resulting in its being invited to screen at numerous film festivals. It first saw its popularity surge at the 65th Venice Film Festival, where the press premiere was marred by problematic subtitles, but its public premiere attended by the producers, director and cast was met with 20 minutes of applause from a packed audience. It was the favored film for the highest award until it was upstaged by Darren Aronofsky's The Wrestler. Even so, Teza won the Special Jury and Best Screenplay awards. The film was next invited to Toronto, where it was also well received. It was entered in competition at the Carthage International Film Festival in Tunisia where it swept 5 categories, including Tanit D'Or for Best Film, Best Screenplay (Haile Gerima), Best Music (Vijay Ayer and Jorga Mesfin), Best Supporting Male Lead (Abeye Tedla) and Best Cinematography (Mario Masini). Thereafter its showing in the Dubai International Film Festival achieved best score for Jorga Mesfin and Vijay Ayer.

It received a limited release, one writer saying that: "Films that do not have a white point of entry, crossover appeal, or an Africanist presence, or do not reinforce plantation ideology, are censored by limited distribution."

== Awards and nominations ==
- FESPACO in Burkina Faso: Golden Stallion of Yennenga
- Venice Film Festival: Special Jury Prize
- Osella Prize for Best Screenplay (Haile Gerima)
- SIGNIS Award, Special Mention
- Carthage Film Festival in Tunisia: Golden Tanit - Best Film; Best Music
- Amiens International Film Festival in France: Golden Unicorn for Best Feature Film
- Rotterdam International Film Festival: Dioraphte Award; Audience Award
- Dubai International Film Festival in Dubai: Best Music
- Thessaloniki Film Festival in Greece: Human Values Award
