= Deutsche Film- und Fernsehakademie Berlin =

German film school in Berlin

German Film and Television Academy Berlin
- Deutsche Film- und Fernsehakademie Berlin
- Established: 1966; 60 years ago
- Affiliations: CILECT
- Director: Ben Gibson
- Location: Berlin, Germany
- Website: www.dffb.de

The Deutsche Film- und Fernsehakademie Berlin (DFFB, German Film and Television Academy Berlin) is a film school in Berlin, Germany. It was founded in 1966.

In the German film school rankings by FOCUS in 2006 (Issue 22), the DFFB was ranked 2nd along with the Academy of Media Arts Cologne and the international filmschool cologne, behind only the Film Academy Baden-Wuerttemberg. Evaluation criteria included the reputation of the university, the support for students, the technical equipment and the number of awards won.

Rainer Werner Fassbinder applied for a place at the DFFB twice, but was refused. Alumni from the inaugural class include Harun Farocki and Skip Norman.

== History ==
The Deutsche Film- und Fernsehakademie Berlin (DFFB) was founded on 17 September 1966 as the first film school in West Germany, officially opened by the Mayor of Berlin, Willy Brandt. Established as a non-profit GmbH under the sole ownership of the State of Berlin, its first directors were Erwin Leiser (artistic) and Heinz Rathsack (administrative).

In the late 1960s, DFFB became involved in student political movements; in May 1968 the school was briefly occupied and renamed, and later that year 18 students were expelled amid debates over management and governance.

From the 1970s onward, the academy was associated with politically engaged and documentary filmmaking. In 1979, female filmmakers entered the student body in larger numbers, marking a shift toward experimental works and narrative cinema. By the 1990s, under the leadership of Reinhard Hauff, the curriculum was extended to include screenwriting and production alongside directing and cinematography.

DFFB gained recognition for its role in the Berlin School movement of the 2000s, with alumni such as Christian Petzold, Thomas Arslan, and Angela Schanelec. It has remained fully publicly funded and retains membership in international associations such as CILECT.

== Study ==
The DFFB provides a five‑year, full‑time program in film including specializations in screenwriting, cinematography, directing, producing, and—since 2018—editing & sound.

The curriculum is organized in two phases:

- A Grundstudium (basic studies) lasting five semesters, during which students receive a generalist foundation in storytelling, technical practice, theory, and cross-departmental collaboration.
- A Hauptstudium (advanced studies) that emphasizes specialization; students undertake individual graduation projects such as feature films, documentaries, or series pilots.

Each discipline concludes with a capstone work:

- For directing, cinematography, production, and editing & sound, a finished graduation film;
- For screenwriting, a completed full-length screenplay.

The program does not confer state-accredited Bachelor’s or Master’s degrees; instead, graduates receive a diploma detailing completed coursework and student productions.

Admission is limited to small cohorts per year (approximately 6–12 places per discipline). Applicants are required to be at least 21 years old and must pass a multi-stage selection process, including practical and theoretical examination.

== Facilities ==
The DFFB is currently based in Studio 16 at Berlin-Adlershof. The site comprises two television studios (approximately 720 m² each), soundproof editing and mixing suites, audio stations, and several seminar rooms suitable for lectures and screenings. A digital cinema-standard colour grading suite and a high-definition editing workflow are available, supported by a central storage server. Sound mixing is facilitated in partnership with the Tonbüro cinema audio facility on the Adlershof campus.

A new purpose-built campus is planned in Moabit (Berlin Decks), which is expected to include additional studios, cinemas for screenings, and expanded technical and storage facilities.

== Films & Festivals ==
The DFFB maintains a festival office responsible for organizing the non-commercial distribution of student films. Each year, the academy's productions are submitted to a range of major international film festivals, including Berlin, Cannes, Venice, Locarno, Toronto, Rotterdam, and South by Southwest. The festival office also supports graduates in developing distribution plans and engaging with distributors, sales agents, cinemas, broadcasters, and streaming platforms.

In 2010, the academy introduced the “Couchsurfing the Berlinale” initiative, which enables DFFB students to host peer students from international film schools during the Berlin International Film Festival. This initiative is designed to foster networking and cross-cultural exchange within the student community.
