= Etiopia (Serbian band) =

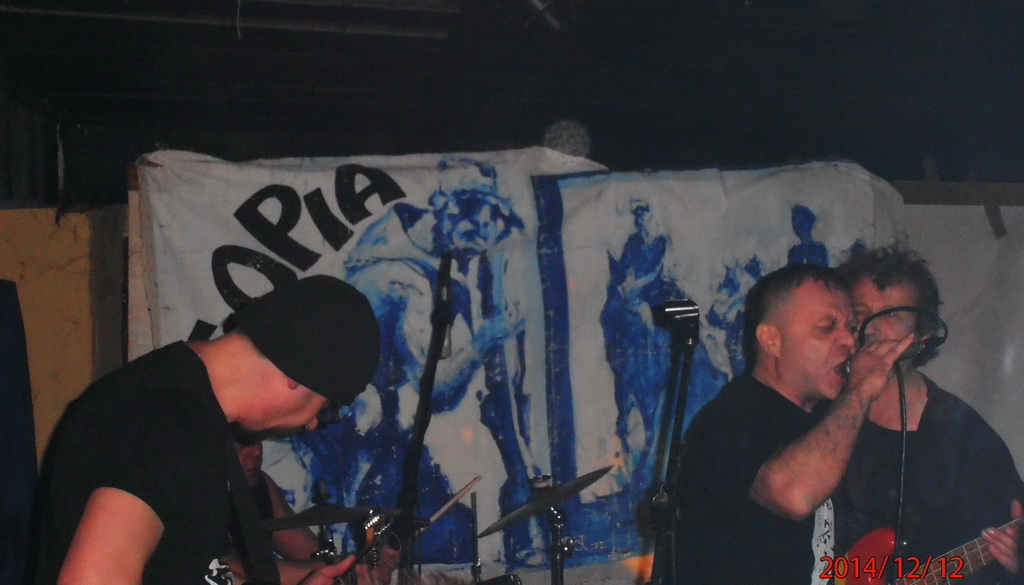
- Etiopia lineup 2014.

Background information
- Origin: Jagodina, Serbia
- Genres: Punk rock, Hardcore punk
- Years active: 1984–92, 2009–
- Past members: Goran Pradegan – vocals Dejan Radovanović – guitar Dejan Arsić Arsa – guitar Alexander Gajin Alez – voice Miško Cvetković Mikrofonija – guitar Dušan Jevđović Jevđa – drums Dejan Đorđević – vocals Marko Stojanović – guitar Ivan Aranđelović Chibi – drums Stevan Popović Beka – vocals Darko Konstantinović – guitar Nenad Stefanović Neško – guitar

Etiopia (Serbian Cyrillic: Етиопиа) was a Serbian and former Yugoslav punk rock and Hardcore punk band from Jagodina.

== Band history ==
Etiopia was created in 1984 and was founded by Saša Milojević Saraga. That year he recorded the first six-song demo Stale bread with the original line-up: Sale Saraga – bass, Goran Pradegan – vocals, Dejan Radovanović – guitar and Dona – drums.

A further four-song demo was recorded in 1987 with a modified line-up: Sale Saraga – bass, Nebojša Pantić Panta – drums, Dejan Arsić Arsa – guitar and Alexander Gajin Alez as a singer. The band played a number of concerts, mostly in Jagodina, but also in Kragujevac, Belgrade and Zagreb.

After the gig in Kragujevac, the band participated on a compilation tape In Yugoslavia, all is well which saw them with a song of the same name.

=== Commercial period ===
In late 1989, Panta and Arsa departed, so Sale put together a third lineup: Sale Saraga – bass, Miško Cvetković Mikrofonija – guitar, Dušan Jevđović – drums and Dejan Đorđević – vocals.

The style of the band was an aggressive riposte to pop rock, according to a mid-1990 statement issued by the board of Zagreb Jugoton. He says the first spot Born in the suburbs, The band has manager (Ivan Plavšić) and frequent appearances on TV. During 1992. the band entered into a contract with Jugodisk on the issuance of the second LP. The material was recorded in addition to the regular force on the set is engaged Tanja Jovićević (ex. October 1864) for background vocals.

Due to disagreements with the manager, the band before the release of the second LP stops working.

From then until 2009, the band was not active.

=== A new beginning ===
The band reunited in April 2009 in the composition of Sale Saraga (bass), Marko Stojanović (guitar), Ivan Aranđelović Chibi (drums) and Stevan Popović Beka (voice).

The band begins to play punk rock, and in a short time has a series of concerts in Serbia, most notably in Belgrade 20 October 2009. in the small hall of SKC as a guest of the British punk pioneer, The Vibrators.

During 2010, continues with concerts during which exits the CD "Live 2010 ..... No chance for better" for the Croatian publishing house Slušaj najglasnije.

In 2012, a collaboration with the Ukrainian punk rock band Ahineya and recorded a CD together.

In December 2014, performance in Talir Club in Jagodina, celebrated the 30th anniversary of the founding of the band, where they appeared on the scene and their former members.

The current line-up of the 2014.:

- Sasa Milojević Saraga – bass guitar,
- Nemanja Vićić Goldi – vocals,
- Nebojša Pantić Panta – drums.

== Discography ==
- Stale bread, the first demo (6 songs) in 1984.
- Demo recordings (4 songs) in 1987.
- Live Faculty of Economics, Kragujevac – Demo 6 May 1989.
- Ethiopia LP (PGP RTB – self-released) 1990.
- Live in Belgrade, SKC, Livingrum CD (studio Krofna – self-published), 2009.
- No Name (Live in studio) Unrealized, 2010.
- Live 2010 ... There is no chance for a better, CD (Slušaj najglasnije- Croatia), 2010.
- Ethiopia & Ahineya (Split CD) 2012.
