= Tikur Sew (song) =

2012 single by Teddy Afro

Single by Teddy Afro

from the album Tikur Sew
- Released: 21 April 2012
- Genre: Ethiopian music
- Length: 9:56
- Label: AdikaRecords
- Producer: AdikaRecords

"Tikur Sew" (translates as "Black man") is a song by Ethiopian singer-songwriter Teddy Afro from the album of the same name. Released on 21 April 2012, the song served as header of the album and emphasized about Ethiopian sovereignty during the Battle of Adwa, a 1896 war between Ethiopia and Italy.

The song is popularly played during the celebration of Adwa Victory Day on 2 March.

Abegazu Kibrework was behind the composition in Kebena Studios in Ethiopia.

== Music video ==
Black-and-white video of "Tikur Sew" showing Ethiopian warriors at the battle

On 12 June 2012, a music video for "Tikur Sew" was released. The black-and-white music video depicts the event at the Battle of Adwa featuring Emperor Menelik II and General Balcha Safo, Fitawrari Habte Giyorgis Dinagde. However, the song was criticized for factual inaccuracies surrounding Ras Makonnen Wolde Mikael. Directed by Tamrat Mekonnen, the music video involved 400 actors. According to producers, the video is one of the most expensive music video in Ethiopian costing earning nearly 500,000 birr. By the time of release, "Tikur Sew" had little reception with poor fans in comparison of the last two albums.
