= Harvest: 3,000 Years =

- Title card
- Directed by: Haile Gerima
- Written by: Haile Gerima
- Starring: See below
- Cinematography: Elliot Davis
- Edited by: Phillip Kuretsky
- Music by: Tesfaye Lemma
- Distributed by: Mypheduh Films
- Release date: 1976
- Running time: 150 minutes
- Country: Ethiopia
- Language: Amharic

Harvest: 3,000 Years, also called by its Amharic name Mirt Sost Shi Amit (ምርት "፫ሺህ ዓመት" mirt "sost shīh ‘amet"), is a 1976 Ethiopian film directed by Haile Gerima.

== Plot ==
For the production of Mirt Sost Shi Amit (Harvest: 3,000 Years) Gerima returned to his native Ethiopia to produce the tale of a poor peasant family who eke out an existence within a brutal, exploitative, and feudal system of labor.

The film follows several characters living in a small rural area, moving from vignette to vignette in their daily lives. The local landowner treats his workers harshly and shouts orders at them from the chair outside his house. His faithful servant Kentu hopes one day to inherit his master's shoes. A nearby family look after the cows and sell grass at the market to buy flour. Meanwhile Kebebe, a man who lives under a bridge and is viewed as "mad" by the locals, stops by sometimes to berate and shout at the landowner for his greed and exploitation of the workers.

Beletch, the young daughter of the local family, works hard tending the cattle and making charcoal from cow manure. She plays with the local boys and resents being treated differently because she is a girl. She has dreams that her grandmother views as prophetic, about the landowner and his son forcing her family under the oxbow and making them plough the land. In the dream they break free and overthrow him. Towards the climax of the film, one of the cows wanders into the flooding river and Beletch drowns trying to bring it back. Kentu comes to the distraught family to express meagre condolences from the landowner and then complain about his own lot in life.

When the harvest is finally in, the locals wonder if they will get their fair share. Kebebe comes to berate the landowner again, but this time chases him down and beats him to death. The police come for Kebebe and stake out his dwelling under the bridge, only to discover he has hanged himself. The harvest is taken away by officials with no word as to whether the locals will receive their share. Beletch's brother impulsively chases after the cart. The film ends with a series of people saying what job they do while images of harvested grain are shown.

== Production ==
Harvest: 3,000 Years was shot on black and white 16mm film. It used non-actors, and was shot in the midst of a civil war after the overthrow of Haile Selassie.

Haile Gerima has said

The first film I made in Ethiopia, Harvest: 3000 Years, shows you the actual footprints of my youth, of where I grew up with my father and the rest of my family

— John L. Jackson Jr, Decolonizing the Filmic Mind: An Interview with Haile Gerima, CALLALOO: A Journal of African Diaspora Arts and Letters (2010)

== Cast ==
- Kasu Yigzaw... Mother
- Gebru Kasa
- Worke Kasa ... Daughter
- Melaku Makonen ... Father
- Adane Melaku ... Son
- Harege-Weyn Tafere ... Grandmother
