= Ashes and Embers =

1982 American film by Haile Gerima

- Directed by: Haile Gerima
- Starring: See below
- Release date: 1982
- Country: United States
- Language: English

Ashes and Embers is a 1982 American drama film directed by Haile Gerima and starring John Anderson.

== Plot ==
Ashes and Embers is a two-hour film about the travails of black urban life. It is the story of a moody and disillusioned black veteran of the Vietnam War.

== Cast ==
- John Anderson as Ned Charles
- Evelyn A. Blackwell as Grandma
- Norman Blalock as Jim
- Kathy Flewellen as Liza Jane
- Uwezo Flewellen as Kimathi
- Barry Wiggins as Randolph

Fellow filmmakers Billy Woodberry and Bernard Nicolas make brief cameo appearances in the film.

== Awards and honors ==
In 1983, director Haile Gerima won the FIPRESCI Prize for Forum of New Cinema at the Berlin International Film Festival for Ashes and Embers.
