= Bush Mama =

- Directed by: Haile Gerima
- Starring: Barbarao, Johnny Weathers
- Release date: 1979
- Running time: 97 minutes
- Country: United States
- Language: English

Bush Mama is an American film made by Ethiopian-American director Haile Gerima, part of the L.A. Rebellion movement of political and experimental black cinema in the 1970s. It was released in 1979 though made earlier, in 1975.

== Making ==
The film was made by Gerima as his thesis project at the University of California at Los Angeles, shot on a small budget. It was directed, produced and edited by Gerima with cinematography by Roderick Young and Charles Burnett.

The first half is filmed in a cinema vérité style, making heavy use of improvisation, while the second half moves away from naturalism towards a Godardian agit prop approach.

== Plot ==
Told in a fragmented style that frequently makes use of flashbacks and abrupt cuts, Bush Mama is the story of Dorothy, a woman living in L.A. neighborhood of Watts, trying to care for her adolescent daughter and her husband, T.C., a discharged Vietnam veteran who thought he would return home to a "hero's welcome." Instead, he is falsely arrested and imprisoned for a crime he didn't commit. Dorothy spends her days trying to obtain welfare, talking with her friends and neighbors (all of whom face poverty and unemployment), and wondering if T.C. will ever return home. As a result of the film's events, both the main characters become radicalized: T.C. from his time spent in prison and Dorothy to violence when she catches a police officer assaulting her daughter in her apartment. The film ends with a Dorothy narrating a letter to T.C., explaining how she finally understands his point of view and the importance of fighting against their collective oppression.

== Cast ==
- Barbarao (as Barbara O. Jones) - Dorothy
- Johnny Weathers - T.C.
- Susan Williams - Luann
- Cora Lee Day - Molly
- Simmi Ella Nelson - Simmi
- Bettie J. Wilson - Social Worker
- Bob Ogburn Jr. - Dahomey man
- Ben Collins - Ben
- Renna Kraft - Angi
- Darian Gibbs - Young Street Boy
- Minnie Stewart - 1st Welfare Recipient
- Malbertha Pickett - 2nd Welfare Recipient
- Bertha Yates - Secretary
- Chris Clay - Policeman
- Charles David Brooks III - Preacher

== Reception and legacy ==
The film received "wide critical acclaim" and was "showcased at many major international film festivals." The New York Times called it "fiery, furious, overflowing with rhetoric and slightly out of breath", praising the main actors but saying the director's fierce polemic sometime overwhelms the dramatic aspects of the film. In 2022, it was selected for preservation in the National Film Registry by the Library of Congress deeming it "culturally, historically or aesthetically significant."

== See also ==
- L.A. Rebellion
- Cinema of Ethiopia
