= Imperfect Journey =

- Directed by: Haile Gerima
- Starring: See below
- Release date: 1994
- Countries: Ethiopia; Italy; United States
- Languages: Amharic, English

Imperfect Journey is a 1994 Ethiopian documentary film directed by Haile Gerima.

== Plot summary ==
Imperfect Journey is a BBC commissioned film, exploring the political and psychic recovery of the Ethiopian people after the atrocities and political repression or "red terror" of the military junta of Mengistu Haile Mariam.

Haile Gerima travelled to Ethiopia together with Ryszard Kapuściński. In the course of the journey they meet and talk with people from all levels of Ethiopian society. The filmmaker questions the direction of the succeeding government and the will of the people in creating institutions guaranteeing their liberation.

Haile Gerima gave his thoughts on the film

The title meant something incomplete. I made a film that was incomplete. Due to the political and cultural climate in which it was done, I made an "imperfect film". The journey was an imperfect journey, and the film is really about how young people's future is determined by a dysfunctional, underdeveloped African reality-a global reality but as it manifests itself in one country.

— Françoise Pfaff, Focus on African Films (2004)
