= Min Alesh? =

2019 Ethiopian drama film

- Theatrical release poster
- Directed by: Amleset Muchie
- Produced by: Amleset Muchie
- Starring: Amleset Muchie; Alebachew Mekonnen; Dirbwork Seyifu; Haddis D. Tadesse; Henok Wondimu
- Production company: Maya Film Production
- Release date: 14 July 2019
- Running time: 84 minutes
- Country: Ethiopia
- Languages: Amharic; English

Min Alesh? (literally "What do you have?") is a 2019 Ethiopian drama sports film directed and produced by Amleset Muchie. Produced by Maya Film Production, the film starts Amleset Muchie as the main character, while Alebachew Mekonnen, Dirbwork Seyifu. Haddis D. Tadesse and Henok Wondimu as supporting roles. The film was theatrically released on 14 July 2019.

The story follows Selam, living in poverty, strengthen her life through running and leads her to international success.

== Plot ==
The film is set in Merkato market where the story follows 21-year-old Selam, who is living in poverty. The story tells Selam transformation of her life with hope and courage, changing her family conditions through running. This leads her way to compete in international competition.

== Awards ==
In 2020, American based New African Film Festival offered an award to Min Alesh.

== Casts ==
- Alebachew Mekonnen
- Amleset Muchie
- Dirbwork Seyifu
- Haddis D. Tadesse
- Henok Wondimu

Other roles

- Haile Gebrselassie
- Azeb Worku
- Henok Wondimu
- Derebwork Seifu
