= Amleset Muchie =

Ethiopian filmmaker and actress (born 1987)

Amleset Muchie Heilu
- አምለሰት ሙጬ
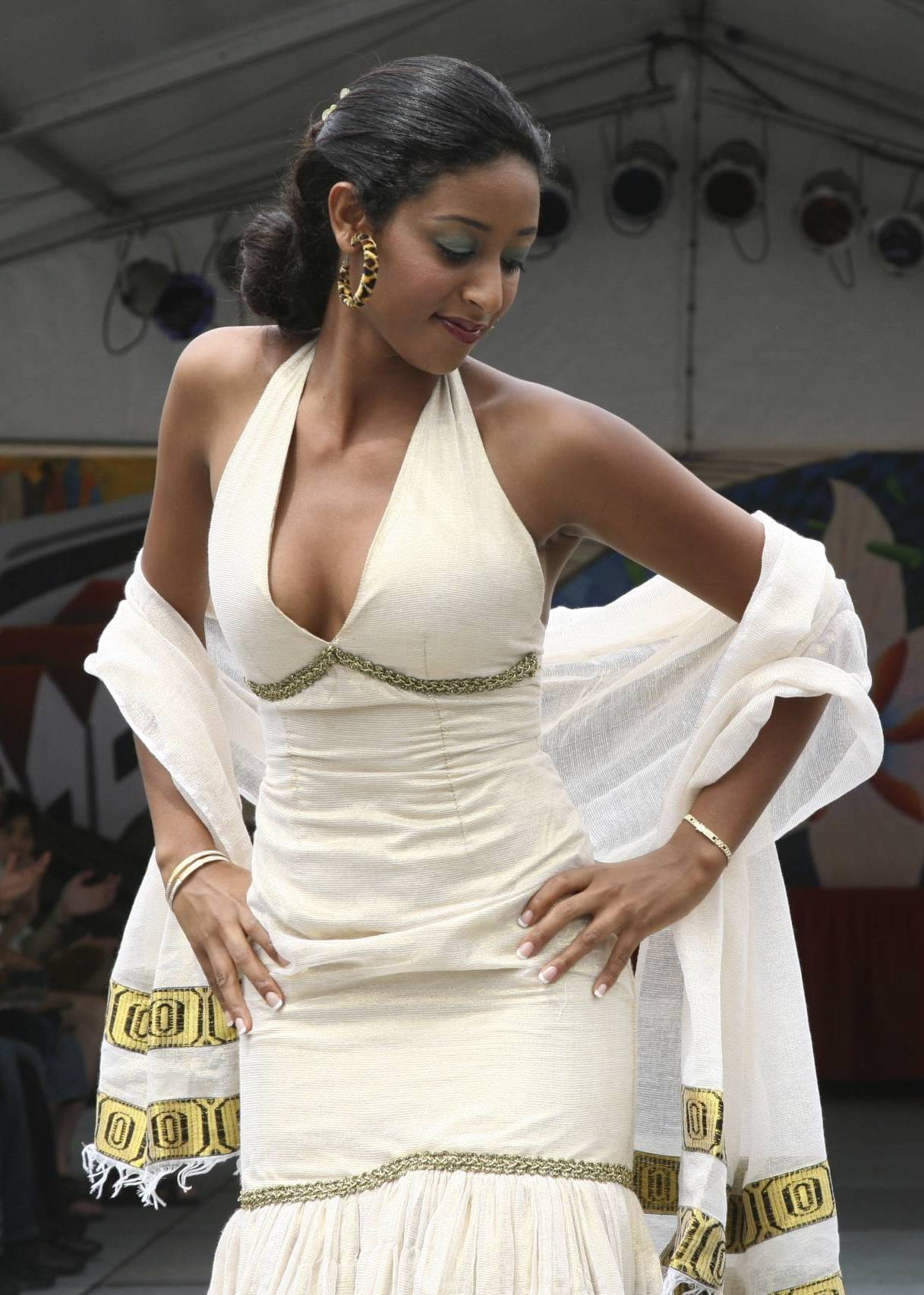
- Amleset dancing eskista at the Ethiopian Fashion Show for the International Festival in 2008
- Born: 5 April 1987 (age 39); Addis Ababa, Ethiopia
- Education: New York Film Academy; Unity University
- Occupations: Actress; filmmaker; TV personality
- Years active: 2004–present
- Height: 1.71 m (5 ft 7 in)
- Spouse: Teddy Afro (m. 2012)
- Children: 4
- Website: amlesetmuchie.com

Amleset Muchie (Amharic: አምለሰት ሙጬ; born 5 April 1987) is an Ethiopian actress, former model, filmmaker and television personality. She is the wife of Ethiopian singer Teddy Afro.

== Early life and career ==
Amleset was born in Addis Ababa, Ethiopia on 5 April 1987. She studied filmmaking at the New York Film Academy and journalism at Unity University in Addis Ababa.

Amleset was the winner of the 2004 Miss University beauty pageant, representing Ethiopia. She was also the winner of the Miss World Ethiopia pageant in 2006.

Additionally, Amleset is a filmmaker. She wrote and produced the movies Sile Fikir, Adoption, and the documentary Green Ethiopia.

Amleset serves as the spokeswoman for Etete Dairy Products in Ethiopia. She has also been outspoken about environmental issues facing Ethiopia.

Amleset participated in the UN 2018 Women First 5 kilometres run that took place on 11 March 2018 in Addis Ababa, Ethiopia. She won the Icon Women's race in a time of 25.25.

== Personal life ==
On 27 September 2012, Amleset married Ethiopian singer Teddy Afro at the Sheraton Addis in Addis Ababa. They have four children together.

== Filmography ==
=== Film ===
Year	Title	Role	Notes
2016	Adoption	Director	Short film
2017	Laptos	Actress	
2018	Yesemwork	Actress	
2017	Bethons	Actress	
2019	Min Alesh?	Actress and director	

=== Documentary ===
Year	Title	Role	Notes
2016	Green Ethiopia	Presenter and director	Environmental

=== Music videos ===
Year	Videos/clips	Artist
2017	"Mar Eske Tuaf"	Teddy Afro
