= After Winter: Sterling Brown =

1985 film directed by Haile Gerima

- Directed by: Haile Gerima
- Starring: See below
- Release date: 1985
- Country: United States
- Language: English

After Winter: Sterling Brown (1985) is a documentary about the famous Black poet Sterling Brown directed by Haile Gerima.
