= Adwa (film) =

1999 film

Adwa - An African Victory
- አድዋ
- Directed by: Haile Gerima
- Distributed by: Mypheduh Films, Inc.
- Release date: 1999
- Running time: 96 minutes
- Countries: Ethiopia; Italy; United States
- Languages: Amharic, English

Adwa: An African Victory (Amharic: አድዋ, romanized: ādiwa) is a 1999 Ethiopian docudrama film directed by Haile Gerima. It concerns the 1896 battle in which Emperor Melinik leads the unified Ethiopian tribes against attempted colonisation by Italy. It also tells the story of Queen Taitu, field commander of the army that broke through the Italian fortress at Adwa.

== Plot summary ==
In 1896, Ethiopia defeats an Italian military bent on conquest and colonization.

The Battle of Adwa resulted in an Ethiopian victory over Italy and became an important symbol of Ethiopian independence. The outcome also influenced broader African movements and ideas concerning resistance to colonial rule, sovereignty, and self-determination.
