= Ethiopia (Teddy Afro song) =

2017 single by Teddy Afro

Single by Teddy Afro

from the album Ethiopia
- Language: Amharic
- Released: 15 April 2017
- Genre: Ethiopian music
- Length: 6:38
- Label: Nahom Records

"Ethiopia" is a song by Ethiopian singer-songwriter Teddy Afro from the album of the same name. Released on 15 April 2017, the song reached the top of the Billboard World Albums chart in that month, at which time more than 600,000 units had been sold.

== Live performance ==
On 3 September 2017, Teddy Afro's Ethiopia concert was halted by police forces on the grounds of government-sponsored event was taking place. Teddy Afro cancelled after apparent announcement of the government.
