= Teddy Afro =

Ethiopian singer-songwriter (born 1976)

Teddy Afro ቴዲ አፍሮ
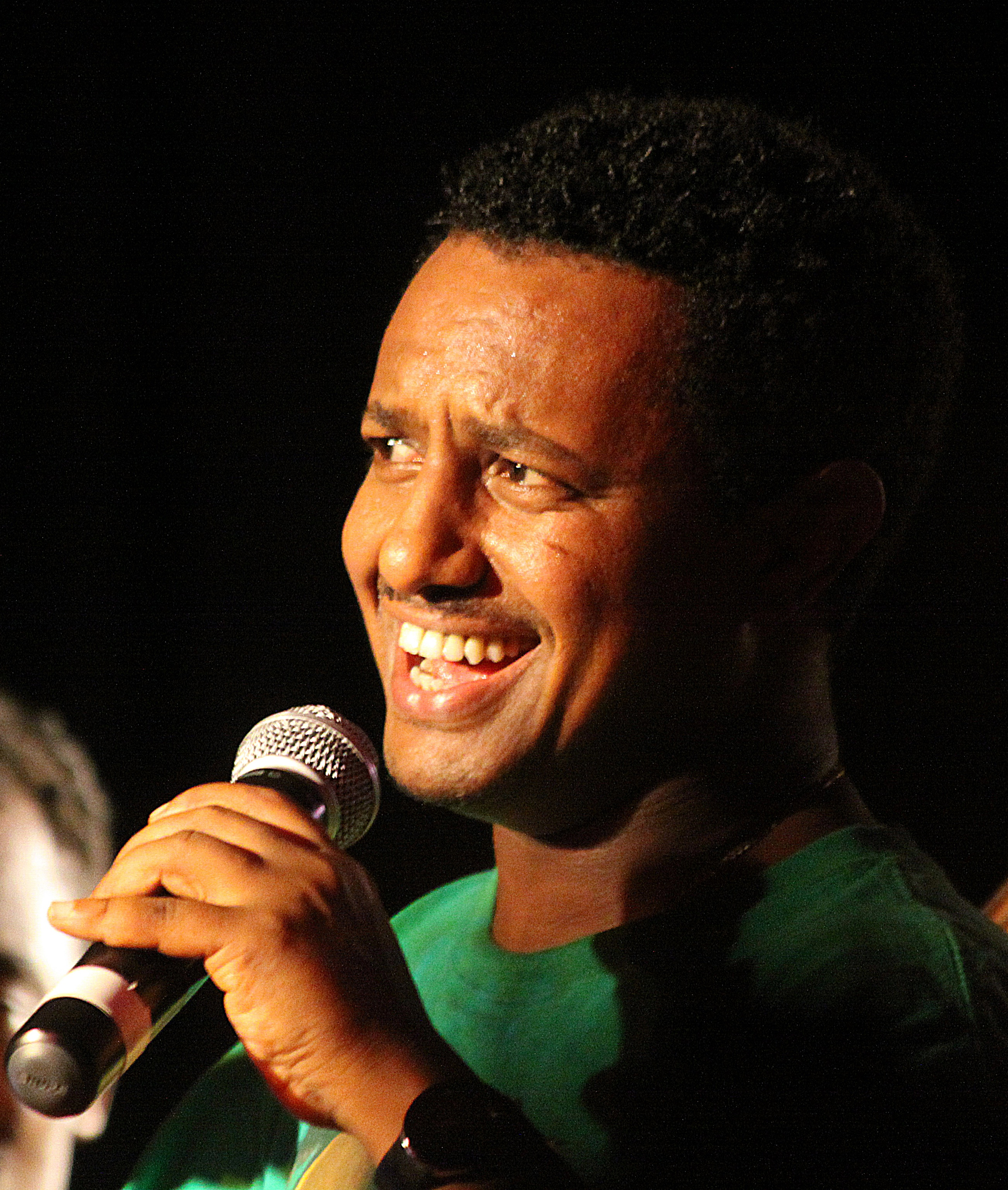
- Teddy Afro performing in Melbourne, Australia, June 2011

Background information
- Born: Tewodros Kassahun; 14 July 1976 (age 50); Addis Ababa, Ethiopia
- Origin: Addis Ababa, Ethiopia
- Genres: Ethiopian music; reggae fusion
- Occupations: Singer; songwriter
- Instruments: Vocals
- Years active: 2001–present
- Label: Nahom Records
- Spouse: Amleset Muchie (m. 2012)
- Website: teddyafro.info

Tewodros Kassahun Germamo (Amharic: ቴዎድሮስ ካሳሁን ገርማሞ; born 14 July 1976), known professionally as Teddy Afro, is an Ethiopian singer-songwriter. Considered one of the most significant Ethiopian artists of all time, he debut his first album titled Abugida in 2001. The success of this album established himself as a prominent artist, followed by his forthcoming album Teddy, released in 2002.

Following the 2005 general election, Tewodros became popular figure by his politically motivated song "Yasteseryal", subsequently imprisoned by the government for alleged hit-and-run incident in 2006. After his release from prison for good conduct in 2009, Tewodros continued his career showcasing his popularity and released widely acclaimed albums like Tikur Sew (2012) and Ethiopia (2017). From then, he released singles related to ongoing events in Ethiopia such as "Demo Be Abay" (2020), "Armash" (2021) and "Na'at" (2022). In April 2026, Tewodros announced his comeback album titled Etorika, released on 16 April 2026.

Tewodros' musical genre is more influenced by reggae fusion and traditional highland Ethiopian music, the latter is dominant throughout his career. Tewodros has had a huge cultural impact on the Ethiopian music industry and has been a big influence on many young artists. In 2012, Tewodros was married to actress and model Amleset Muchie; together they have four children.

== Life and career ==
=== 1976–2001: Early years ===
Tewodros Kassahun Germamo was born in Addis Ababa, Ethiopia on 14 July 1976 to a singer and songwriter Kassahun Germamo and dancer Tilaye Arage.

=== 2001–2007: Abugida, Teddy and Yasteseryal ===
Teddy Afro made his debut in 2001 with the album Abugida, quickly establishing himself as a prominent voice in his native country. Mixing reggae, traditional Ethiopian styles, and pop music, his sophomore LP, 2005's Yasteseryal yielded a major hit in its controversial title track, which criticized corruption in the country's government. The song "Hab Dahlak" talks about the division of Ethiopia and Eritrea in terms of couples separating. Four of the album's songs were subsequently banned from media outlets, though "Yastesereyal" sales and influence remained controversial.

His second album Teddy was done in 2000 but released in 2002.

His third album, Yasteseryal was released in 2005. This album was one of the most influential and controversial. Teddy's lyrical sentiments and the release of this album coincided with the elevated political tension in Ethiopia surrounding the 2005 Ethiopian general election. The government banned four of his songs including "Yasteseryal" from playing on Ethiopian media outlets. This restriction was put to rest after the governing party was thrown out of power in April 2018. He has since performed these songs in Addis Ababa Meskel Square concerts. Nonetheless, the album sold more than a million copies within a few months after its release.

=== 2012–2017: Tikur Sew and Ethiopia ===
After his breakthrough, Teddy released his fourth album, Tikur Sew, on 14 April 2012, paying homage to Emperor Menelik II and the Battle of Adwa. Tikur Sew became the most expensive and widely sold album in Ethiopia after his fifth album, Ethiopia. It achieved significant sales in music markets. AdikaRecords' producer Ashenafi Zeleke mentioned that the music markets required 500,000 CDs and 200,000 cassettes for the album, indicating its popularity.

On 22 August 2014, Teddy released "Be 70 Dereja," which garnered 9.1 million views on YouTube within two years. The music video featured 1970s-themed black-and-white scenarios in Ethiopia, showcasing various monuments and places.

Teddy's fifth album, Ethiopia, was officially released on 2 May 2017. It reached the top of the Billboard World Albums chart in that month, with more than 600,000 units sold by then.

=== 2020–2025: "Demo Be Abay" and single career perpetuation ===
Kassahun held the Adwa! Wede Fikir Guzo concert on 22 February 2020 to a record-breaking crowd in Addis Ababa Meskel Square.

On 3 August 2020, Teddy released "Demo Be Abay", a song dedicated to the Abbay river, known in English as the Blue Nile River. The song is a critique of Egyptian attitudes, or "Egypt's shamelessness", in regard to its claims over the waters of the river Nile; Egypt had claimed that the filling of the reservoir for the Grand Ethiopian Renaissance Dam would endanger its water supply. On 2 November 2021, he released "Armash", which reflects the ongoing situation in Ethiopia especially the Tigray War and calls for unity of Ethiopians. On 21 June 2022 a song titled "Na'at" was released following a massacre of 600 Amharas in Gimbi district in West Wollega Zone of Oromia Region. "Na'at" was critical for Abiy Ahmed government over ongoing civil conflict in the country.

=== 2026–present: Etorika ===
In April 2026, Tewodros announced his comeback album titled Etorika, officially released on 16 April 2026. His initial remarks about the album widely circulated on social media and sparked controversy. Due to its alleged political sensitive nature and anti-governmental rhetoric like its predecessor Yasteseryal (2005), the government banned his album to be released on official sites. The Coalition for Ethiopian Unity (CUD) condemned the ban in press conference as deliberate tool for the ruling party manipulation on the upcoming election in June.

On 17 April, Meseret Media reported that approximately 105 youths had been arrested in Addis Ababa for streaming "Das Tal (Ansaw)" meaning "put up the tent", a trending track from the album that addresses contemporary political divisions and ethnic tension in Ethiopia and the silencing of the innocent civilians.

== Personal life ==
Tewodros has been married to Ethiopian actress, model, and producer Amleset Muchie. She was behind one of his music videos "Mar eske Tuwaf", a rendition of Love to the Grave (Fikir Eske Meqabir), serving as a director. Their wedding took place on 27 September 2012 at Sheraton Hotel, attended by family members, close friends and fellow musicians. They have four children; two daughters and two sons. The couple currently lives in Addis Ababa.

Tewodros was apprehended on 6 December 2006 in connection with an alleged hit-and-run incident during the 2005 Ethiopian general election. He was accused with driving under the influence and hitting a forty-year-old homeless man. The government sentenced him to six years in prison, and fined with 18000 birr ($1,755). With good behavior, Teddy was released in August 2009.

== Artistry ==
Teddy's earlier work was solely based on reggae fusion but gradually turned with Ethiopian music employing traditional vibrato vocals, and itchy triplet of "Ethiopia sound".

== Award ==
In 2021, Teddy received an honorary doctorate from Gondar University. He went to Gondar with his wife to accept the honorary award in person.

== Discography ==
=== Studio albums ===
Albums list with singles
Abugida (Abo Geeda)
- Released: 2001
- Record label: Nahom Records and Massinko Entertainment
- Singles:
  - "Lijinet Alat"
  - "Leman Lemash"
  - "Mona Lisa"
  - "Abugida (Abo Geeda)"
  - "Lela Alawkim"
  - "Ayne Hul Gize"
  - "Haile Haile"
  - "Baygermish"
  - "Birabiro"
  - "Haile Selassie"
  - "Hewan Endewaza"
Teddy
- Released: 2002
- Record Label: AIT Records
- Singles:
  - "Lebbo"
  - "Wazendiro"
  - "Shegnehush"
  - "Guadegna"
  - "Gud Serachign"
  - "Tizibt"
  - "Hagere"
  - "Wub Aleme"
  - "Lame Bora"
  - "Qezebiye"
  - "Tsigereda"
Tarik Tesera
- Released: 2004
- Record label: Evangadi Production
- Singles:
  - "Tarik Tesera (Anbessa)"
Yasteseryal
- Released: 2005
- Record label: Nahom Records and Electra Music Shop (in Ethiopia)
- Executive Producer: Elias Fikru and Nathenael Gemechu (Nahom Records)
- Singles:
  - "Yasteseryal"
  - "Bel Sitegne"
  - "Lambadina"
  - "Promise"
  - "Alamin"
Yasteseryal Edition 2
- Released: 2005
- Record Label: Nahom Records
- Executive Producer: Elias Fikru
- Singles:
  - "Yasteseryal"
  - "Bel Sitegne"
  - "Lambadina"
  - "Promise"
  - "Alamin"
  - "Seleme"
  - "Kier Yhon"
  - "Shemendafer"
  - "Balderesu"
  - "Semie Lelieleh Afe"
  - "Lemn Yhon"
  - "Tizita"
  - "Hab Dahlak"
  - "Itegie"
  - "Nigeregne Kalshima"
Best Collection – Nahom Volume 14
- Released: 2006
- Record label: Nahom Records
- Singles:
  - "Menta Wedije"
  - "Yregal"
  - "Lamie Bora"
  - "Wede Hagere Bet"
Gizzie Lekuluu
- Released: 2007
- Singles:
  - "Gizzie Lekulu"
Tikur Sew
- Released: 14 April 2012
- Record label: AdikaRecords
- Singles:
  - "Tikur Sew"
  - "Tenanekegn"
  - "O Africaye"
  - "Ayzenegas Libe"
  - "Sile Fikir"
  - "Chewatash"
  - "Kelal Yihonal"
  - "Tsebaye Senay"
  - "Hilim Ayidegemim"
  - "Des Yemil Sikay"
  - "Fiyorina"
Ethiopia
- Released: 2 May 2017
- Label: Nahom Records
- Singles:
  - "Ethiopia"
  - "Sembere"
  - "Mar Eske Tuaf"
  - "Anna Nyaatu"
  - "Mematsene"
  - "Tamolshal"
  - "Yamral"
  - "Atse Tewodros"
  - "Emma Zend Yider"
  - "Marakiye"
  - "Amen"
  - "Adey"
  - "Nat Baro"
  - "Olan Yizo"
Etorika
- Released: 16 April 2026
- Label: Addis Zema
- Singles:
- "Das Tal (Ansaw)"
- "Etorica"
- "Samnew"
- "Sememene (GuRaggae)"
- "Tsion Mushraye"
- "Tintago (Pintago)"
- "Yemaereg Tig (Abra Nuariye)"
- "Tayegn"
- "Bemeskotu"
- "Bilchita"
- "Yeazo Emba"
- "Ze Tsedal"
- "Marema"
- "Merkeb"
- "Sema Erase"
- "Jember"

=== Non-album singles ===
Non-album singles
"Afralehu"
- Released: 2009
"Kaba"
- Released: 2013
" Be 70 Dereja"
- Released: 22 August 2014
"Korkuma Africa"
- "Korkuma Africa"
- "Korkuma Africa (Reggae Mix)"
- "Alhed Ale"
- Released: 2015
"Demo Be Abay"
- Released: 3 August 2020
"Armash"
- Released: 2 November 2021
"Na'at"
- Released: 21 June 2022
"Beza"
- Released: 1 March 2024

=== DVDs ===
DVDs list with singles
Tarik Tesera
- Released: 2004
- Record Label: Nahom Records
- Executive Producer: Elias Fikru
- Singles:
  - "Tarik Tesera (Anbessa)"
Yasteseryal – DVD
- Released: 2005
- Record Label: Nahom Records
- Executive Producer: Elias Fikru
- Singles:
  - "Yasteseryal"
  - "Promise"
  - "Anbessa"
  - "Seleme"
Lambadina – DVD
- Released: 2006
- Record Label: Bruke Films and Admass Advertising
- Producer: Bruke M. Abaynhe
- Director: Zeresenay Berhane Mehari
- Singles:
  - "Lambadina"
  - "Semie Lelileh Afe"
  - "Negeren Kalash"
  - "Alamn Alena"
Inya Sinewaded (Concert) – DVD
- Released: 2007
- Record Label: Nahom Records
- Executive Producer: Elias Fikru
