= Sankofa (film) =

- The DVD cover
- Directed by: Haile Gerima
- Written by: Haile Gerima
- Starring: Kofi Ghanaba; Oyafunmike Ogunlano; Alexandra Duah
- Distributed by: Mypheduh Films
- Release date: 1993
- Running time: 124 minutes
- Countries: Burkina Faso; Germany; Ghana; United States; United Kingdom
- Language: English

Sankofa (Amharic: ሳንኮፋ) is a 1993 Ethiopian-produced drama film written and directed by Haile Gerima that is centered on the Atlantic slave trade. The storyline features Oyafunmike Ogunlano, Kofi Ghanaba, Mutabaruka, Alexandra Duah, and Afemo Omilami. The word Sankofa is derived from the Akan language of Ghana and means to "go back, look for, and gain wisdom, power and hope," according to Dr. Anna Julia Cooper. The word 'Sankofa' stresses the importance of one not drifting too far away from one's past in order to progress in the future.

In the film, Sankofa is depicted by a bird and the chants and drumming of a Divine Drummer. Gerima's film shows the importance of people of African descent not drifting far away from their African roots. Gerima uses the journey of the character Mona to show how the African perception of identity included recognizing one's roots and "returning to one’s source" (Gerima).

== Plot ==
The film opens with an elderly Divine Drummer, Sankofa (played by Kofi Ghanaba), playing Fontomfrom drums and chanting the phrase, "Lingering spirit of the dead, rise up." That is his form of communication with the ancestors of the African lands, specifically Ghana. His drumming is essential in drawing forth the spirit of his ancestors, who died during the Maafa back home. The story proceeds to show Mona (Oyafunmike Ogunlano), a contemporary African-American model, in a photo session on the coast of Ghana.

The session takes place at Cape Coast Castle, where she writhes on the ground as the photographer encourages her to imagine she's having sex with the camera. Mona is unaware of the history of West African slave forts like Cape Coast Castle in the slave trade because she has been disconnected from her African roots for so long. While Mona is on the beach modeling, she encounters the mysterious old man Sankofa, who was playing the drums at the beginning of the film.

Sankofa persistently urges Mona to remember her past and insists that Cape Coast Castle is a sacred place. He conjures up the spirits of the enslaved Africans who were taken in chains from Cape Coast to the Americas. He attempts to block tourists from entering. When Mona enters the castle, she is transported back in time and is surrounded by many enslaved Africans. Mona attempts to run out and is met by European slave traders; she tries to reason with them, claiming that she is free. The slave traders pay no attention to Mona's claim, dragging her to a fire where they strip off her clothing and brand her.

Mona takes on the life of a house servant named Shola "to live the life of her enslaved ancestors." She is taken to the Lafayette plantation in the Southern United States, where she suffers abuse by her slave masters and is often a victim of rape. On the plantation, Shola encounters Nunu (Alexandra Duah), an African-born field hand who remembers the "old ways" and was characterized as a "strong motherly slave with a rebel mindset"; Noble Ali (Afemo Omilami), a headman with loyalty split between his masters and fellow slaves and who deeply loved Nunu and refused to let anything happen to her; and Shango (Mutabaruka), a rebellious West Indian slave who was sold to the Lafeyettes after being deemed a trouble-maker and who soon became the lover of Shola.

Shango is named after the Yoruba god of thunder and lightning, and displays loyalty to his fellow slaves to the extent that he would risk his own life. He often gets in trouble for attempting to fight on behalf of another slave. He often performs rebellious acts such as trying to get Shola to poison the overseer or cutting down sugar canes out of anger. When asked why he does not simply run away from the plantation, he says it is because he cannot leave his fellow slaves behind.

Both Nunu and Shango resist and rebel against the slave system by doing everything in their power to gain freedom. Shola witnesses Nunu and Shango being actively involved in a secret society that had meetings at night; its members were slaves from the Lafayette and other nearby plantations. At first, Shola says that she does not want to join the secret society because she had Christian beliefs. Together, the slaves of the society decide to rebel; their confrontstion results in a fire and sugar cane fields are left in ashes.

Nunu comes into conflict with her own mixed-race son, Joe. He was fathered by a white man who raped Nunu on the slave ship. Joe (Nick Medley) has been made a head slave and often has to discipline other slaves in order to keep his master happy. Joe identifies as a white Christian man, abandoning his African roots. He is brainwashed by Father Raphel (Reginald Carter), who teaches Joe that the Africans on the plantation, including his mother, are devil worshippers and that Joe could not identify with them.

Joe ends up killing his mother Nunu because he believes that she is possessed. He later realizes that his action was sinful, and he cannot forgive himself. After Nunu's death, some believe that she was able to return home on the wings of a bird, meaning that her deep desire to return to Africa was finally fulfilled.

Throughout the film, Shola gradually transforms from being a compliant slave to a person who gains rebellious instincts after being given the Sankofa bird by Shango. The bird once belonged to Shango's father, and Shango decided to pass it on to Shola after she was flogged for attempting to run away. Inspired by Nunu and Shango's determination to defy the system, Shola joins them in fighting back against her masters in a rebellion. She retaliates against her white rapist and kills him.

After her trials, Shola returns to the present as Mona, deeply aware of her African roots. She is greeted by a woman who says "My child, welcome back" and walks past the photographer, who symbolizes colonialism and westernization. Now enlightened, Mona is captivated by the sound of Sankofa's chants and his African drum. She joins a group of black people who have also learned what Sankofa really means and are reconnecting to their roots. Nunu comes out of the slave castle while Mona was in a trance and sheds tears of joy. Meanwhile, Sankofa plays his drums, chanting: "Lingering spirit of the dead, rise up and possess the stolen spirit of those stolen in Africa." The film ends with a bird soaring high in the sky, signifying the final liberation of those who had found the true meaning of the word "Sankofa" and reconnected to their past.

== Cast ==
- Kofi Ghanaba as Sankofa
- Oyafunmike Ogunlano as Mona/Shola
- Alexandra Duah as Nunu
- Nick Medley as Joe
- Mutabaruka as Shango
- Afemo Omilami as Noble Ali
- Reggie Carter as Father Raphael
- Mzuri as Lucy
- Jimmy Lee Savage as Mussa
- Hasinatu Camara as Jumma
- Jim Faircloth as James
- Stanley Michelson as Mr. Lafayette
- John A. Mason
- Louise Reid
- Roger Doctor as Nathan
- Alditz McKenzie as Kuta
- Chrispan Rigby as Photographer
- Maxwell Parris as Baby Ngozi
- Hossana Ghanaba

== Critical reception ==
Sankofa won the grand prize at the African Cinema Festival in Italy and Best Cinematography at the FESPACO Pan-African Film Festival in Burkina Faso.

The film is also listed as one of the 500 Utterly Essential Movies to Cultivate Great Taste in Cinema by professors of Film Studies at Harvard University, under the heading "the most essential films in the history of world cinema, 1980-2000."

"The film was met with great approval by the audience, which was as deeply moved as I was by this epic two-hour drama." (William Beik, July 1994)

"Haile Gerima's poetic and precisely detailed film takes its audience into its heroine's life and mind as her moral sense is challenged and changed. No viewer can avoid the discomforting questions the film so eloquently raises."

"The Ethiopian-born Gerima, best known for "Bush Mama"—his 1976 portrait of an impoverished woman living in Watts—has brought a distinctive style and an often raw but always authoritative command of his medium to confront the horrors of slavery and its persisting significance, perhaps as no other filmmaker has."

"Sankofa (1993) is a compelling historical account of the Maafa, the African Holocaust. This rich film illustrates slavery from the view that many Blacks have been denied, their history. It explores the themes of loss of identity and racial consciousness; respecting and returning to our ancestral roots; and recognizing the connections that exist between people of African descent who live throughout the world."

"Clearly, Gerima intends for Sankofa to expand the boundaries of Black representation in ways that include more diverse, realistic, and empowering images and, in turn, enable Black audiences to see themselves in new ways that are divorced from dominant images."

== Nominations ==
The film was nominated for the Golden Bear at the 43rd Berlin International Film Festival.

== Re-release ==
In 2021, ARRAY remastered the movie in 4K with a limited theatrical run and releasing on Netflix on September 24, 2021. It had its L.A. re-release debut at DuVernay’s Array Creative Campus.

== See also ==
- Africanfuturism
- List of films featuring slavery
- List of Afrofuturist films
