= Haile Gerima =

Ethiopian filmmaker

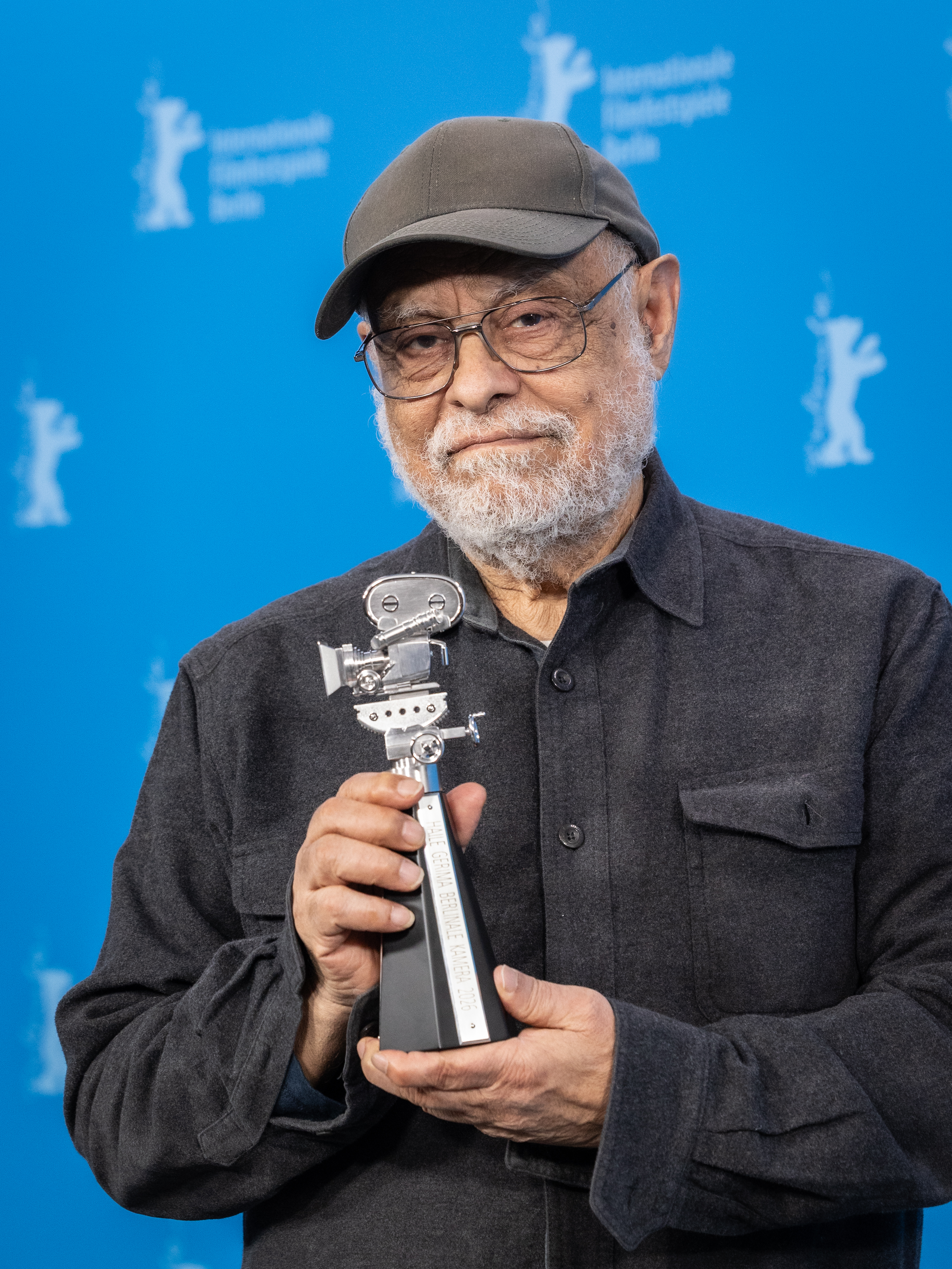
- Gerima in 2026
- Born: March 4, 1946 (age 80); Gondar, Ethiopia
- Education: Goodman School of Drama; University of California
- Occupations: Film director, film producer, screenwriter
- Years active: 1972–present
- Known for: Sankofa
- Spouse: Shirikiana Aina
- Awards: 1993 – Best Cinematography Award for Sankofa, FESPACO, Burkina Faso

Haile Gerima (born March 4, 1946) is an Ethiopian filmmaker who lives and works in the United States. He is a leading member of the L.A. Rebellion film movement, also known as the Los Angeles School of Black Filmmakers. Since 1975, Gerima has been a film professor at Howard University in Washington, D.C. He is best known for Sankofa (1993), which won two awards.

== Early life ==
Gerima was born and raised in Gondar, Ethiopia. His father was a dramatist and playwright, who traveled across the Ethiopian countryside staging local plays. He was an important early influence. He has discussed the unconscious effect representations of colonialism in film had on him as a child:

...as kids, we tried to act out the things we had seen in the movies. We used to play cowboys and Indians in the mountains around Gondar...We acted out the roles of these heroes, identifying with the cowboys conquering the Indians. We didn't identify with the Indians at all and we never wanted the Indians to win. Even in Tarzan movies, we would become totally galvanized by the activities of the hero and follow the story from his point of view, completely caught up in the structure of the story. Whenever Africans sneaked up behind Tarzan, we would scream our heads off, trying to warn him that 'they' were coming".

In 1967, Gerima emigrated to Chicago, United States, to study theatre. He enrolled in acting classes at the Goodman School of Drama in Chicago. He met Teshome Gabriel in Maine while teaching Amharic to Peace Corps volunteers. As he stated to Los Angeles Times: "When I was growing up, I wanted to work in theater—it never occurred to me I could be a filmmaker because I was raised on Hollywood movies that pacified me to be subservient. Film making isn't encouraged or supported by the Ethiopian government." He felt limited by theater and was resigned, notes Francoise Pfaff, to "subservient roles in Western plays".

In 1970, he moved to California to attend the University of California, where he earned Bachelor's and Master's of Fine Arts degrees in film. He was part of a generation of new black filmmakers who became known as the Los Angeles School of Black filmmakers, along with Charles Burnett (Killer of Sheep), Jamaa Fanaka (Penitentiary), Ben Caldwell (I and I), Larry Clark and Julie Dash (Daughters of the Dust).

== Film career ==
=== 1970s ===
By the time Gerima graduated in 1976, he had made four films: Hour Glass (1972); Child of Resistance (1972); Bush Mama (1976); and Mirt Sost Shi Amit (also known as Harvest: 3,000 Years; 1976)

Gerima's 1976 Bush Mama is the story of Dorothy and her husband T.C., a discharged Vietnam veteran who anticipated a hero's welcome on his return. He is arrested and imprisoned for a crime he did not commit. Theirs is a world of welfare, perennial unemployment, and despair. It addresses issues of institutionalized racism, police brutality, and poverty; themes that remain pertinent today.

For the production of Mirt Sost Shi Amit (Harvest: 3,000 Years), Gerima returned to his native Ethiopia. It is an account of a poor peasant family who eke out an existence within a brutal, exploitative, and feudal system of labor.

His film Wilmington 10 – U.S.A. 10,000 (1978) explores racism and the shortcomings of the criminal justice system in the United States by examining the history of the nine black men and one white woman who became known as the Wilmington Ten.

=== 1980s ===
Gerima met his future wife and a Detroit native, Shirikiana Aina, while she was attending Howard University. They were married during her time at UCLA.

The travails of black urban life in the United States are explored in the two-hour Ashes and Embers (1982), the story of a moody and disillusioned black veteran of the Vietnam War. Gerima discusses his movie Ashes and Embers in an interview, "presented in collaboration with ARRAY, the rebirth of the African American Film Festival Releasing Movement (AFFRM)" at the Schomburg Center. He states that Hollywood has produced an "Anglo-Saxon dictatorship and culture housed in the mainstream cinema [that] dictates." Which he responds "with responsibility [the filmmakers] have to the language of cinema because [their] language, [their] accent has to come into cinema. [In] African cinema this accent is local Senega, Burkina Faso etc."

Gerima made these films to honor the struggles of his ancestors and to make names known throughout history. His films show the concept of identity and independence. He wanted to use his work as a critical lens for personal growth and creative development.

After Winter: Sterling Brown (1985) is a documentary about the notable black American poet.

=== 1990s ===
Gerima is perhaps best known as the writer, producer, and director of Sankofa (1993). This dramatic tale of African resistance to slavery won international acclaim: awarded first prize at the African Film Festival in Milan, Italy; Best Cinematography at Africa's premier Panafrican Film and Television Festival of Ouagadougou (FESPACO); and nominated for the Golden Bear at the 43rd Berlin International Film Festival.

The film presents a brutally realistic portrayal of African slavery. The story is revealed through the eyes of Mona, a modern-day woman who is possessed by spirits and transported to the past as Shola, a house slave on the Lafayette plantation in Louisiana.

Imperfect Journey (1994), commissioned by the BBC, explores the political and psychic recovery of the Ethiopian people after the political repression or "red terror" of the military junta of Mengistu Haile Mariam. The filmmaker suggests questions about the direction of the succeeding government and the will of the people in creating institutions guaranteeing their liberation.

Adwa: An African Victory (1999) is a documentary drama of the history of the 1896 battle, which concluded the war in which the Ethiopian people united to defeat the Italian army.

=== Teza ===
Gerima's most recent film is Teza (2008). Set in Ethiopia and Germany, the film chronicles the return of an Ethiopian intellectual to his country of birth during the repressive Marxist regime of Mengistu Haile Mariam and the recognition of his own displacement and powerlessness at the dissolution of his people's humanity and social values. After several years spent studying medicine in Germany, Anberber returns to Ethiopia only to find the country of his youth replaced by turmoil. His dream of using his craft to improve the health of Ethiopians is squashed by a military junta that uses scientists for their own political ends. Seeking the comfort of his countryside home, Anberber finds no refuge from violence. The solace that the memories of his youth provide is quickly replaced by the competing forces of military and rebelling factions. Anberber needs to decide whether he wants to bear the strain or piece together a life from the fragments that lie around him.

== Business ventures ==
Gerima founded Sankofa, a bookstore, cafe and film center, located at 2714 Georgia Avenue NW, Washington, D.C. It is directly across the street from Howard University. To gain more independence, Gerima and his wife Shirikiana Aina (who is also a filmmaker) in 1984 established Mypheduh Films Inc., a distribution company for low-budget, independent films. They relied on this for his film Sankofa.

== Filmography ==
- 1972 – Hour Glass
- 1972 – Child of Resistance
- 1976 – Bush Mama
- 1976 – ምርት 3ሺ ዓመት (Mirt Sost Shi Amit also known as Harvest: 3,000 Years)
- 1978 – Wilmington 10 – U.S.A. 10,000
- 1982 – Ashes and Embers
- 1985 – After Winter: Sterling Brown
- 1993 – Sankofa
- 1994 – Imperfect Journey
- 1999 – አድዋ Adwa – An African Victory
- 2009 – ጤዛ (Teza)

== Awards nominations and distinctions ==
Over the course of his career, Haile Gerima has received numerous awards and distinctions at film festivals.

- 1976 – Grand prize / Silver Leopard for Harvest: 3,000 Years, Locarno
- 1982 – Grand Prix Award for Ashes and Embers-Lisbon International Film Festival
- 1983 – FIPRESCI Film Critics Award for Ashes and Embers, Berlin International Film Festival
- Outstanding Production Ashes and Embers, London Film Festival
- 1984 – Tribute Festival De la Rochelle, France
- 1987 – Long Metrage De Fiction-Prix de la Ville de Alger for Ashes and Embers
- 1993 – Best Cinematography Award for Sankofa, FESPACO, Burkina Faso
- 2003 – Lifetime Achievement Award, fourth Annual Independence Film Festival, Washington, D.C.
- 2003 – Lifetime Achievement Award, 4th Annual Independence Film Festival, Washington, D.C.
- 2008 – Venice Film Festival Special Jury Prize and Golden Osella for Best Screenplay – Teza
- 2009 – Jury Award at the 18th International Film Festival Innsbruck/Austria – Teza
- 2009 – Golden Stallion of Yennenga at the FESPACO African Film Festival – Teza
- 2009 – Dioraphte Award Hubert Bals film in highest audience regard at the Rotterdam Film Festival
- 2009 – Golden Tanit/Best Film Award for its "modesty and genius", Best Music (Jorga Mesfin Vijay Ayers), Best Cinematography (Mario Massini), Best Screenplay (Haile Gerima), Best Supporting Actor Abeye Tedla at the Carthage/Tunisia Film Festival for Teza
- 2009 – Golden Unicorn and Best Feature Film at the Amiens/France International Film Festival France for Teza
- 2009 – The Human Value's Award at the Thessaloniki Film Festival in Greece for Teza
- 2009 – Official Selection at the Toronto Film Festival for Teza
