= Brendan Gleeson =

Irish actor and director (born 1955)

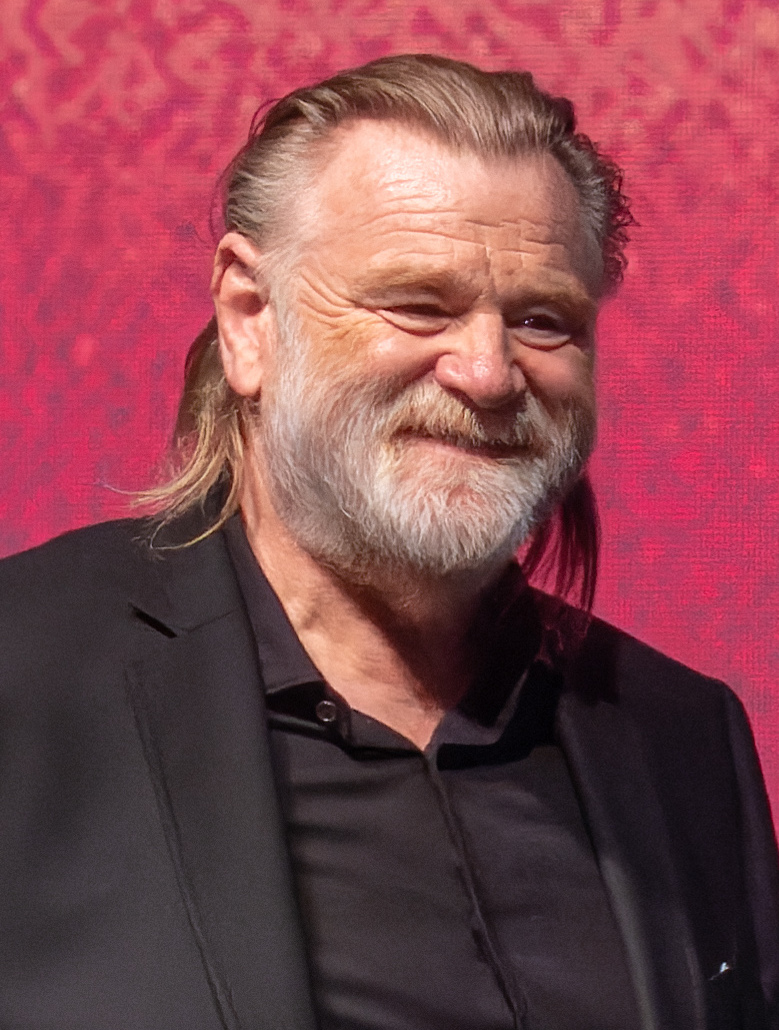
- Gleeson in 2022
- Born: 29 March 1955 (age 71); Dublin, Ireland
- Education: University College Dublin
- Occupations: Actor; film director
- Years active: 1984–present
- Spouse: Mary Weldon (m. 1982)
- Children: 4, including Domhnall and Brian
- Awards: Full list

Brendan Gleeson (born 29 March 1955) is an Irish actor. He has received various accolades, including a Primetime Emmy Award, two British Independent Film Awards and three IFTA Awards, along with nominations for an Academy Award, three BAFTA Awards and five Golden Globe Awards. In 2020, he was listed at number 18 on The Irish Times list of Ireland's greatest film actors. He is the father of actors Domhnall Gleeson and Brian Gleeson.

He is known for his supporting roles in films such as Braveheart (1995), Michael Collins (1996), 28 Days Later (2002), Gangs of New York (2002), Cold Mountain (2003), Troy (2004), the Harry Potter film series (2005–2010), Paddington 2 (2017), The Ballad of Buster Scruggs (2018), and The Tragedy of Macbeth (2021). He is also known for his leading roles in films such as The General (1998), In Bruges (2008), The Guard (2011), Calvary (2014), and The Banshees of Inisherin (2022) for which he received a nomination for the Academy Award for Best Supporting Actor.

He won a Primetime Emmy Award in 2009 for his portrayal of Winston Churchill in the television film Into the Storm. He also received a Golden Globe Award nomination for his performance as Donald Trump in the Showtime series The Comey Rule (2020). From 2017 to 2019, he starred in the crime series Mr. Mercedes. He received an Emmy Award nomination for Stephen Frears' Sundance TV series State of the Union (2022).

== Early life ==
Gleeson was born in Dublin, the son of Pat (1925–2007) and Frank Gleeson (1918–2010). Gleeson has described himself as having been an avid reader as a child. He received his second-level education at St Joseph's CBS in Fairview, Dublin, where he was a member of the school drama group. He received his Bachelor of Arts at University College Dublin, majoring in English and Irish. He worked for several years as a secondary school teacher of Irish and English at the now defunct Catholic Belcamp College in north County Dublin, which closed in 2008. He was working simultaneously as an actor while teaching, doing semi-professional and professional productions in Dublin and surrounding areas. He left the teaching profession to commit full-time to acting in 1991. In a 2014 interview to promote Calvary, a film that deals with child abuse, Gleeson stated that on one occasion in primary school a Christian Brother had "dropped the hand" on him. During his twenties he played Gaelic football as a full-forward for St Finian's of Swords.

== Career ==
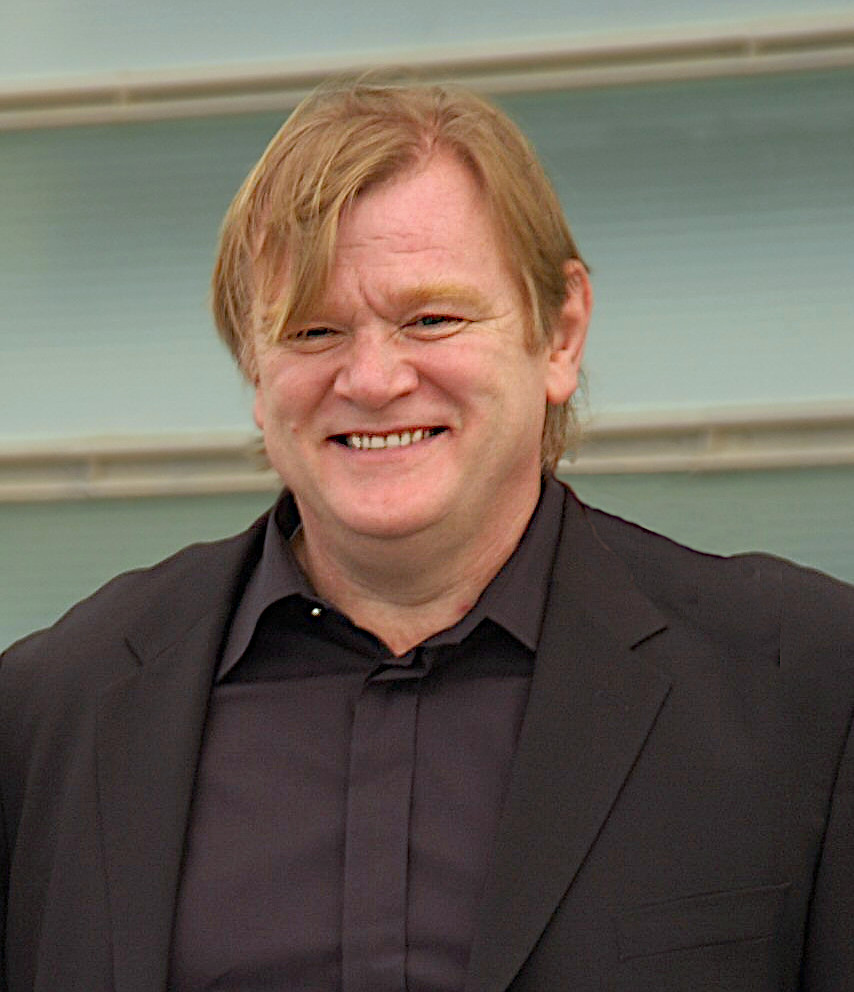
Brendan Gleeson, September 2005

As a member of the Dublin-based Passion Machine Theatre company, Gleeson appeared in several of the theatre company's early and highly successful plays such as Brownbread (1987), written by Roddy Doyle and directed by Paul Mercier, Wasters (1985) and Home (1988), written and directed by Paul Mercier. He has also written three plays for Passion Machine: The Birdtable (1987) and Breaking Up (1988), both of which he directed, and Babies and Bathwater (1994) in which he acted. Among his other Dublin theatre work are Patrick Süskind's one-man play The Double Bass and John B. Keane's The Year of the Hiker.

Gleeson started his film career at the age of 34. He first came to prominence in Ireland for his role as Michael Collins in The Treaty, a television film broadcast on RTÉ One, and for which he won a Jacob's Award in 1992. He has acted in such films as Braveheart, I Went Down, Michael Collins, Gangs of New York, Cold Mountain, 28 Days Later, Troy, Kingdom of Heaven, Lake Placid, A.I. Artificial Intelligence, Mission: Impossible 2, and The Village. He won critical acclaim for his performance as Irish gangster Martin Cahill in John Boorman's 1998 film The General.

In 2003, Gleeson was the voice of Hugh the Miller in an episode of the Channel 4 animated series Wilde Stories. While Gleeson portrayed Irish statesman Michael Collins in The Treaty, he later portrayed Collins's close collaborator Liam Tobin in the film Michael Collins with Liam Neeson taking the role of Collins. Gleeson later went on to portray Winston Churchill in Into the Storm. Gleeson won an Emmy Award for his performance. Gleeson played Barty Crouch Jr impersonating Hogwarts professor Alastor "Mad-Eye" Moody in the fourth, and Alastor Moody himself in the fifth and seventh Harry Potter films. His son Domhnall played Bill Weasley in the seventh and eighth films.

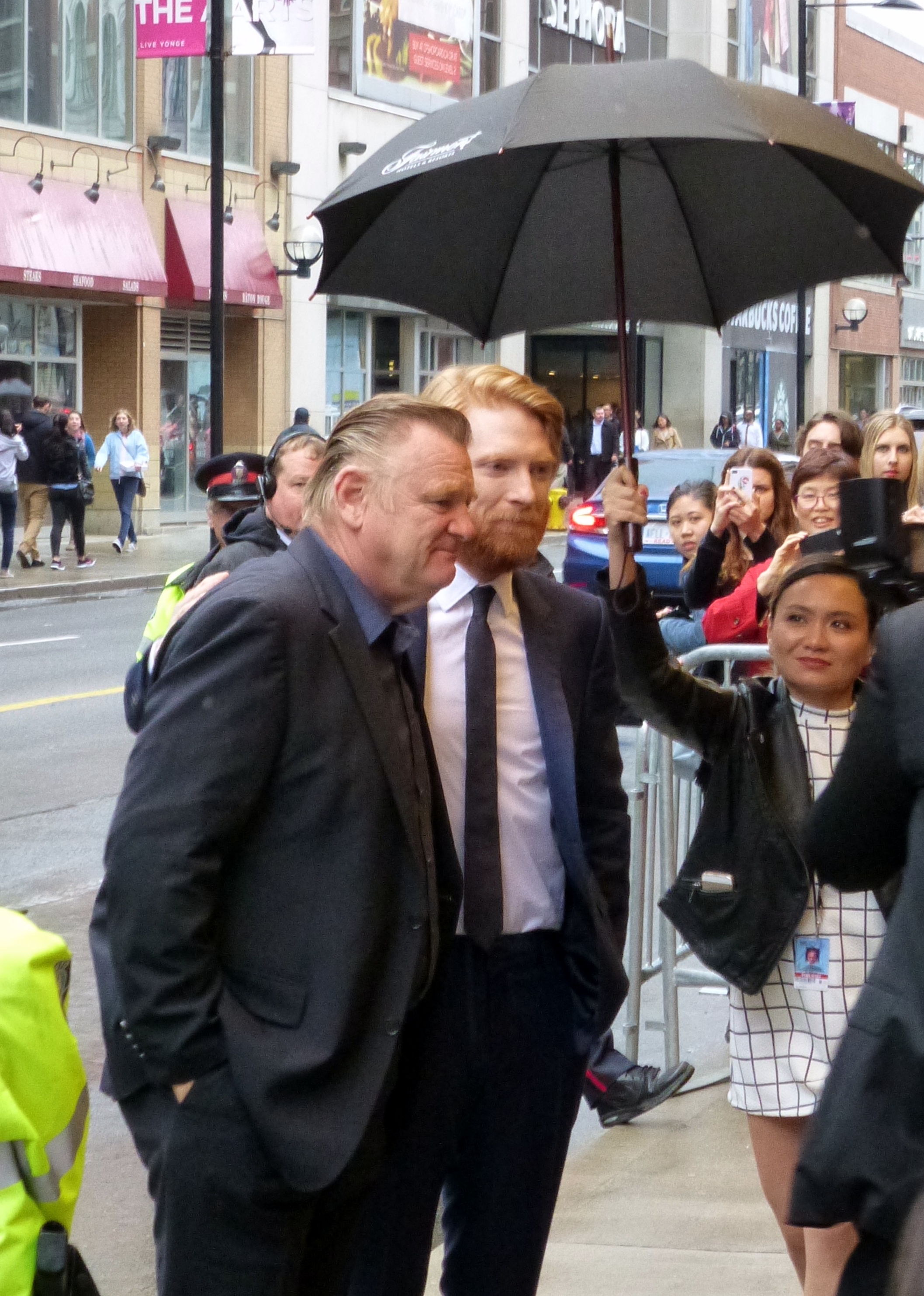
Brendan with his son Domhnall Gleeson at the Toronto Film Festival 2015

Gleeson provided the voice of Abbot Cellach in The Secret of Kells, an animated film co-directed by Tomm Moore and Nora Twomey of Cartoon Saloon which premiered in February 2009 at the Jameson Dublin International Film Festival. Gleeson starred in the short film Six Shooter in 2006, which won an Academy Award for Best Live Action Short Film. This film was written and directed by Martin McDonagh. In 2008, Gleeson starred in the comedy crime film In Bruges, also written and directed by McDonagh. The film, and Gleeson's performance, enjoyed huge critical acclaim, earning Gleeson several award nominations, including his first Golden Globe nomination. In the movie, Gleeson plays a mentor-like figure for Colin Farrell's hitman. In his review of In Bruges, Roger Ebert described the elder Gleeson as having a "noble shambles of a face and the heft of a boxer gone to seed."

In July 2012, he started filming The Grand Seduction, with Taylor Kitsch, a remake of Jean-François Pouliot's French-Canadian La Grande Séduction (2003) directed by Don McKellar; the film was released in 2013. In 2016, he appeared in the video game adaptation Assassin's Creed and Ben Affleck's crime drama Live by Night. In 2017 he finished Psychic, a short he directed and starred in. In 2022, he reunited with Martin McDonagh in the tragic comedy The Banshees of Inisherin starring opposite Colin Farrell. For his performance as Colm Doherty, he received numerous awards nominations, including for the Academy Award, Golden Globe Award, and Critics' Choice Award for Best Supporting Actor.

=== Musical talent ===
Gleeson is a fiddle and mandolin player, with an interest in Irish folklore. He played the fiddle during his roles in Cold Mountain, Michael Collins, The Grand Seduction, and The Banshees of Inisherin, and also features on Altan's 2009 live album. In the Coen brothers' The Ballad of Buster Scruggs (2018), Gleeson sings "The Unfortunate Rake". He has also made a contribution in 2019 to the album by Irish folk group Dervish with a version of Rocky Road To Dublin.

== Personal life ==
Gleeson has been married to Mary Weldon since 1982. They have four sons, including Domhnall and Brían. He has one grandson and one granddaughter. Gleeson speaks fluent Irish and is an advocate of the promotion of the Irish language. Gleeson is a fan of English football club Aston Villa.

== Acting credits ==
=== Film ===
Year	Title	Role	Notes
1990	The Field	Quarryman	
1992	The Bargain Shop	Jim Kennedy	
1992	M.A.N.: Matrix Adjusted Normal	Dr Abraham	Short film
1992	Far and Away	Social Club Policeman	
1992	Conneely's Choice	Josie Conneely	Short film
1992	Into the West	Inspector Bolger	
1993	The Snapper	Lester	
1995	The Life of Reilly	Patient	Short film
1995	Braveheart	Hamish Campbell	
1996	Angela Mooney Dies Again	Barney Mooney	
1996	Michael Collins	Liam Tobin	
1996	Trojan Eddie	Ginger	
1997	Spaghetti Slow	Frank Ferguson	
1997	Turbulence	Stubbs	
1997	The Butcher Boy	Father Bubbles	
1997	A Further Gesture	Richard	
1997	I Went Down	Bunny Kelly	
1997	Before I Sleep	John Harte	Short film
1998	The General	Martin Cahill	
1998	The Tale of Sweety Barrett	Sweet Barrett	
1999	This Is My Father	Garda Jim	
1999	Lake Placid	Sheriff Hank Keough	
1999	My Life So Far	Jim Menries	
2000	Mission: Impossible 2	John C. McCloy	
2000	Harrison's Flowers	Marc Stevenson	
2000	Saltwater	Simple Simon	
2000	Wild About Harry	Harry McKee	
2001	J.J. Biker		
2001	Cáca Milis	Pól	Short film; Irish-language; English: Cake
2001	The Tailor of Panama	Michelangelo "Mickie" Abraxas	
2001	A.I. Artificial Intelligence	Lord Johnson-Johnson	
2002	28 Days Later	Frank	
2002	Gangs of New York	Walter "Monk" McGinn	
2002	Dark Blue	Jack Van Meter	
2003	Cold Mountain	Stobrod Thewes	
2004	In My Country	De Jager	
2004	Troy	Menelaus	
2004	The Village	August Nicholson	
2004	Six Shooter	Donnelly	Short film
2005	Kingdom of Heaven	Raynald of Châtillon	
2005	Breakfast on Pluto	John Joe Kenny	
2005	Harry Potter and the Goblet of Fire	Alastor "Mad-Eye" Moody	
2006	Studs	Walter Keegan	
2006	The Tiger's Tail	Liam O'Leary	
2007	Black Irish	Desmond	
2007	Harry Potter and the Order of the Phoenix	Alastor "Mad-Eye" Moody	
2007	Beowulf	Wiglaf	Motion-capture
2008	In Bruges	Ken	
2009	The Secret of Kells	Abbot Cellach	Voice
2009	Perrier's Bounty	Darren Perrier	
2010	Green Zone	Martin Brown	
2010	Harry Potter and the Deathly Hallows – Part 1	Alastor "Mad-Eye" Moody	
2010	Noreen	Con Keogh	Short film
2011	The Guard	Sergeant Gerry Boyle	
2011	Albert Nobbs	Dr. Holloran	
2011	The Cup	Dermot Weld	
2012	Safe House	David Barlow	
2012	The Raven	Captain Charles Hamilton	
2012	The Pirates! In an Adventure with Scientists!	Pirate with Gout	Voice
2012	The Company You Keep	Henry Osborne	
2013	The Smurfs 2	Victor Doyle	
2013	The Grand Seduction	Murray French	
2014	Calvary	Father James Lavelle	
2014	Edge of Tomorrow	General Brigham	
2014	Song of the Sea	Conor, Mac Lir	Voices; English and Irish versions
2014	Stonehearst Asylum	The Alienist	
2015	Suffragette	Arthur Steed	
2015	In the Heart of the Sea	Old Thomas Nickerson	
2015	Pursuit	Searbhán	
2016	Alone in Berlin	Otto Quangel	
2016	Trespass Against Us	Colby	
2016	Atlantic	Narrator	Voice; Documentary
2016	Live by Night	Thomas Coughlin	
2016	Assassin's Creed	Joseph Lynch	
2017	Hampstead	Donald Horner	
2017	Paddington 2	Knuckles McGinty	
2018	Captain Morten and the Spider Queen	Father	Voice
2018	Psychic	Jeremiah	Short film; also director
2018	The Ballad of Buster Scruggs	Irishman (Clarence)	Segment: "The Mortal Remains"
2019	Frankie	Jimmy	
2019	Ghost in the Graveyard	Student / Extra	
2021	Riverdance: The Animated Adventure	The Huntsman	Voice
2021	The Tragedy of Macbeth	King Duncan	
2022	The Banshees of Inisherin	Colm Doherty	
2023	A Greyhound of a Girl	Paddy	Voice
2024	Joker: Folie à Deux	Jackie Sullivan	
2025	H Is for Hawk	Alisdair Macdonald	

=== Television ===
Year	Title	Role	Notes
1989	Dear Sarah	Brendan Dowd	Television film
1990	Hard Shoulder	Lorry Driver	Television film
1990	Glenroe	Sam Treacy	Soap series
1991	Saint Oscar		Television film
1991	The Treaty	Michael Collins	Television film
1991	In the Border Country	Farmer	Television film
1993	Screenplay	Thomas Macken	Episode: "Love Lies Bleeding"
1994	The Lifeboat	Leslie Parry	9 episodes
1995	Kidnapped	Red Fox	Television film
1998	Making the Cut	Flanagan	Television film
2005	Jakers! The Adventures of Piggley Winks	Uncle Ferny	Voice; Episodes: "Wish Upon A Story: Part 1 and 2"
2009	Into the Storm	Winston Churchill	HBO television film
2010	1916 Seachtar na Cásca	Narrator	Voice; Documentary series
2014	The Money	James Castman	Unaired pilot
2017–2019	Mr. Mercedes	Bill Hodges	Lead role; 30 episodes
2020	The Comey Rule	Donald Trump	2 episodes
2021	Frank of Ireland	Liam	Episode: "Memento Mary"
2022	State of the Union	Scott	10 episodes
2022	Saturday Night Live	Himself (host)	Episode: "Brendan Gleeson/Willow"
2025	The Simpsons	Joe Quimby Sr. (old)	Voice; episode: "Sashes to Sashes"
2026	Spider-Noir	Finbar "Finn" Byrne / Silvermane	8 episodes
TBA	The Good Daughter	Rusty	Upcoming series

=== Theatre ===
Year	Title	Role	Playwright	Venue
1984	Drowning	Da	Paul Mercier	SFX Hall, Dublin
1985	Wasters	Bonzo	Roddy Doyle	SFX Hall, Dublin
1986	Spacers	Chas	Paul Mercier	SFX Hall, Dublin
1987	Brownbread	Mr. Farrell	Roddy Doyle	SFX Hall, Dublin
1987	The Birdtable	—N/a	Himself (also director)	SFX Hall, Dublin
1988	Home	Valentine	Paul Mercier	SFX Hall, Dublin
1988	Breaking Up	—N/a	Himself (also director)	SFX Hall, Dublin
1989	War	George	Roddy Doyle	SFX Hall, Dublin
1989	King of the Castle	Matt Lynch	Eugene McCabe	Abbey Theatre, Dublin
1990	The Double Bass	Musician	Patrick Süskind	Andrews Lane Theatre, Dublin
1990	The Year of the Hiker	Joe	John B. Keane	Gaiety Theatre, Dublin
1990	Prayers of Sherkin	Patrick Kirwin	Sebastian Barry	Abbey Theatre, Dublin
1991	The Plough and the Stars	Fluther Good	Sean O'Casey	Abbey Theatre, Dublin
1993	Pilgrims	Joe	Paul Mercier	Project Arts Centre, Dublin
1994	Babies and Bathwater	Terence	Himself	Project Arts Centre, Dublin
2001–2002	On Such As We	Oweney	Billy Roche	Abbey Theatre, Dublin
2015	The Walworth Farce	Dinny	Enda Walsh	Olympia Theatre, Dublin
2025	The Weir	Jack	Conor McPherson	Olympia Theatre, Dublin
2025	The Weir	Jack	Conor McPherson	Harold Pinter Theatre, West End

=== Theme park attractions ===
Year	Title	Role	Ref(s)
2025	Harry Potter and the Battle at the Ministry	Alastor "Mad-Eye" Moody	

== See also ==
- List of actors with Academy Award nominations
- List of Academy Award winners and nominees from Ireland
- List of Irish people
- List of people from Dublin
