= Yolanda Ncokotwana =

South African TV Presenter and producer

- Born: Yolanda Ncokotwana; South Africa
- Occupations: Artist, Filmmaker, Executive Producer, Designer, Inntrepreneur

Yolanda Ncokotwana Yolanda Ncokotwana is a film and television professional specializing in production, financing, project development and policy making. She is filmmaker, Story consultant, Executive Producer, Entrepreneur, Fashion, Clothing Boutique Co-owner, Former Sport Programme, Former Broadcaster. she has worked on in television, script consulting, and content management, she has overseen the funding of numerous award-winning films and launched co-production initiatives, including partnerships with Netflix and the Netherlands. A graduate in film production, she actively participates in international panels.

== Career ==
Her broadcasting career began at the South African Broadcasting Corporation, rising-up the ranks to becoming a Commissioning Editor. Her achievements include acquiring international content, leading content strategies for various flagship programmes and international sporting events such as the 2014 FIFA World Cup, the 2015 Cricket World Cup and the 2016 RIO Olympic Games. Currently, she works at the National Film and Video Foundation as a Production and Development Manager. Her focus is the non-fiction genre where she has developed and consulted on films that have won multiple local, and international awards. Her passion is creating platforms to foster growth and development of local content both locally and internationally. Yolanda’s goal is to spearhead transformation in the film industry, ensuring the representation of different narratives. She holds a Film and Production degree from the Tshwane University of Technology and is currently pursuing a degree in Creative Writing from the University of South Africa.

== Jury Member ==
- Jackson Wild (2022)
- Joburg international Film Festival (2025)
- Indian Ocean International Film Festival (2nd edition)

== participation ==
2018, she was part of the SEDIBA international financing programme for producers Designed for experienced and emerging producers in TV drama and feature film products and offers focused training in international financing, packaging, sales, and distribution, facilitated by NFVF.

In July 2020, she was part of the Mehret Mandefro-led Indaba Africa inaugural group of participants from across the African continent with career development focus, participating in online workshops between August 28 and September 11, 2020 with the chief aim of creating new ways of financing the changing African cinema by helping producers in terms of building finance bases for co-production from the scratch.
