= Mahder =

Mahder can be both a feminine given name and a surname. Notable people with the name include:

- Mahder Assefa (born 1987), Ethiopian actress
- Maria Mahder (1923–2001), American television actress
