= Mehret Mandefro =

Ethiopian-American filmmaker, physician, anthropologist

- Born: 1977 (age 48–49); Addis Ababa, Ethiopia
- Education: Harvard University
- Occupations: Physician; Anthropologist; Filmmaker
- Known for: Difret (2014)
- Website: drmehret.com

Mehret Mandefro (born 1977) is an Ethiopian–American film/television producer, writer, physician and anthropologist. She is the group leader of the Indaba Africa, a co-founder of Realness Institute and co-founder of Truth Aid Media and is a board member of advisors for the shared Harvest Fund. She is also a recipient of The Paul & Daisy Soros Fellowships for New Americans (2001) and in 2007 sat as one of the 41 distinguished New American panelists. In 2016, she was honoured by Carnegie Corporation of New York as one of America's Great Immigrants.

== Life and education ==
Mandefro was born in Addis Ababa, Ethiopia in 1977 and grew up in Alexandria, Virginia, US. Her father, Ayalew Mandefro, was Ethiopia's Minister of Defence and her mother, Tsedale K. Mandefro. Her family escaped to the US after the coming of Ethiopia's Communist regime which tried assassinating her father. She attended Thomas Jefferson High School for Science and Technology and completed her undergraduate and graduate medical degrees at Harvard University. She went on to pursue a master's degree in Global Public Health at the London School of Hygiene and Tropical Medicine as a Fulbright Scholar. She completed the Robert Wood Johnson Foundation Health and Society Scholars Program at the University of Pennsylvania with a focus on the social determinants of health and went on to pursue a PhD in Cultural Anthropology at Temple University where she completed a dissertation on the formation of American health policy in the federal government. She went on to train in primary care internal medicine at Montefiore Medical Center and Albert Einstein College of Medicine where she pursued research on HIV disparities among black women.

Mandefro was also a White House Fellow in the Obama Administration.

== Career ==
Mandefro is one of the 2009 Honorees in the Black Girls Rock Awards, receiving the Community Service Award.

In March 2014, she was one of the women honoured in the International Women's Day celebration in New York City, by WomenWerk. Also in 2014, she co-produced the film Difret, directed by Zeresenay Berhane Mehari.

She co-executive produced a 2019 Zeresenay Berhane film titled, Sweetness in the Belly, alongside Adrian Sturges, Laura Bickford and Fiona Druckenmiller. In the same year, the documentary she co-directed and co-produced titled, "The Loving Generation", was nominated for a Webby People's Voice Award. The film was officially confirmed alongside three others to be internationally premiered at the prestigious Toronto International Film Festival (TIFF).

At the 2019 Cannes Film Festival held at Palais Des Festivals, Cannes, France, she advised African filmmakers to build strategic partnerships by collaborating with one another, pointing out that other Africa countries can learn from Nollywood to improve on their film industries.

She, alongside film director Abraham Gezahagne, in February 2020 represented Ethiopia at the Berlinale Africa Hub, whereat she presented the opportunities available in and challenges faced by the film and TV industry the country.

She, alongside Alicia Keys, Lacey Schwartz Delgado, Elliott Halpern and Elizabeth Trojian, executive produced the documentary, How It Feels To Be Free, based on the Ruth Feldstein's book, How It Feels To Be Free: Black Women Entertainers and the Civil Rights Movement, directed by Yoruba Richen and is to be premiered in winter 2021 by PBS and WNET.

== Filmography ==
| Year | Film | Role | Genre | Ref. |
|---|---|---|---|---|
| 2021 | How It Feels To Be Free | Co-executive producer | Documentary | |
| 2019 | The Loving Generation | Co-director, co-producer | Documentary | |
| 2019 | Sweetness in the Belly | Co-executive producer | Drama | |
| 2017 | Little White Lie | Producer/writer | Documentary | |
| 2014 | Difret | Producer | Drama | |
