= County Clare (disambiguation) =

County Clare is a county in the Republic of Ireland.

County Clare may also refer to:

- County Clare (Parliament of Ireland constituency), a constituency until 1801
- County Clare (UK Parliament constituency), a constituency from 1801 to 1885
- Clare County Council, the authority responsible for local government in County Clare, Ireland
- Clare County, Michigan, a county in the United States

== See also ==
- The Boys from County Clare, a 2003 film
