= Diplomat (film) =

2012 Ethiopian spy thriller film

- Theatrical film poster
- Directed by: Noad Geshaw
- Starring: Mahlet Shumete; Mahder Assefa; Anteneh Asres; Meron Getnet; Tatek Negash; Andrias Asnakew
- Distributed by: Mekdi Productions
- Release date: 15 January 2012
- Running time: 95 minutes
- Country: Ethiopia
- Language: Amharic

Diplomat is a 2012 Ethiopian spy thriller film directed by Naod Gashaw and produced by Mekdi Productions. Premiered on 15 January 2012, the film stars with Mahlet Shumete (Kidist) and Meron Getnet (Melat) as members of intelligence team at National Intelligence and Security Service (NISS) while Andrias Asnakew as Rick is double agent on a mission who want to attack against Ethiopia by assassinating foreign presidents in order to deter Ethiopia's diplomatic relationship.

== Plot ==
The plot revolves around bomb attack in Addis Ababa supposedly by Al-Shabaab with the aid of local Muslim businessman with high tech, conspiracy filled attack in Ethiopia. The Ethiopian National Intelligence and Security Service (NISS) strive to sabotage these coordinated attackers. The main character Kidist with her intelligence team work at the NISS while Rick is double agent on a mission who want to attack against Ethiopia by assassinating foreign president in order to deter Ethiopia's diplomatic relationship. He also eventually revealed as a CIA spy, in the side of Egyptian interests on the Grand Ethiopian Renaissance Dam, and suspected Interpol criminal. Kidist successfully retrieve all information identical to the person and his background, who tried to kill her family at house, and detonate bomb under their office table. The bomb misfired with assistance of Chinese bomb expert named Lee Chuank. Kidist managed to kill Rick and his Muslim men at the latter story.

== Casts ==
- Mahlet Shumete
- Mahder Assefa
- Meron Getnet
- Tatek Negash
- Andrias Asnakew
