= Cáca Milis =

- Directed by: Jennifer Keegan
- Written by: Brian Lynch
- Starring: Charlotte Bradley; Brendan Gleeson
- Release date: 2001
- Running time: 18 minutes
- Country: Ireland
- Language: Irish

Cáca Milis (transl. Cake) is a 2001 Irish short film starring Charlotte Bradley and Brendan Gleeson. The majority of the film takes place on a train between the two main characters.

== Plot ==
An exhausted woman named Catherine is sitting on a train reading an erotic novel. It is established that this is a form of escapism for her, as she is otherwise caring for her ageing mother. A blind man with asthma called Pól sits across from her. He proceeds to annoy her and prevent her from reading her book in peace by making loud noises, asking peculiar questions and telling inane stories. When Catherine gets sick of Pól constantly annoying her, she begins to taunt and confuse him. She learns that he becomes short of breath when he is confused. Eventually, she tells him that a piece of the sweet cake that he is eating has a worm in it. When she tells him this he panics and begins to suffer from an asthma attack. He attempts to find his inhaler on the table, but Catherine quietly takes it and hides it from Pól. As he suffocates, she places the inhaler back down on the table just out of his reach. Pól slumps over in his seat as Catherine disembarks from the train.

== Cast ==
- Charlotte Bradley as Catherine, a businesswoman who's caring for her ageing mother
- Brendan Gleeson as Pól, a blind man who uses the train regularly
- Eithne McGuinness as Nora, Catherine's mother
- Phyllis Ryan as Theresa
- Ciabhán Ó Murchú as Tea Steward

== Legacy ==
The film is studied by Irish students who study Irish for the Leaving Certificate Examination.
