= Omar Baroud =

Dutch actor and writer

- Born: 1991/1992; Lelystad, Netherlands
- Education: Central School of Speech and Drama (MA)
- Years active: 2017–present

Omar Baroud (born 1991/1992) is a Dutch actor and writer based in London. He is known for his theatre work and his role in the Star series Wedding Season (2022).

== Early life ==
Baroud was born in Lelystad, Netherlands to a Curaçaoan mother and a Lebanese father and spent some of his childhood on the island of Curaçao. Baroud moved to England at age 14, where he attended the ACS International School in Cobham. He studied Political Science at university, before going on to train at the Central School of Speech and Drama, graduating in 2016 with a Master of Arts in Acting.

== Career ==
After graduating from drama school, Baroud appeared in the 2017 productions of Fennel-Spiked Lamb at the Bunker, All Places That the Eye of Heaven Visits alongside Mark Rylance, The Last Ones at Jermyn Street Theatre, and Irvine Welsh's Creatives for the Edinburgh Fringe Festival. This was followed by his television debut in an episode of the 2018 Netflix series The Innocents and a role in Shirleymander at the Playground Theatre. In 2019, Baroud had a recurring role as Ron in the first series of the BBC One drama Baptiste and was an understudy for A Song at Twilight at the Theatre Royal in Bath. In 2021, he appeared in As You Like It at the Watermill Theatre and returned to the Edinburgh Fringe for You Bury Me.

In 2022, Baroud took over the role of Cliff Bradshaw in the West End production of Cabaret at the Playhouse Theatre and had his first main television role as Jackson in the series Wedding Season, made for the Star platform on Disney+. After winning the 2021 MTI Stiles + Drewe Mentorship Award, Baroud made his writing debut with the musical After Elijah, which he presented in July 2022 at The Other Palace. The production was directed by Matthew Xia with musical direction by Flynn Sturgeon, and the cast included Sharif Afifi, Parisa Shahmir, Nick Carter, Jodie Jacobs, Stephen Rahman-Hughes and Lanna Joffrey.

== Filmography ==
Year	Title	Role	Notes
2018	The Innocents	Youth	Episode: "Passionate Amateur"
2019	Baptiste	Ron	4 episodes (series 1)
2020	Circle Triangle	Dean	Short film
2022	Wedding Season	Jackson	Main role
TBA	Late in Life		

== Stage ==
Year	Title	Role	Notes
2017	Fennel-Spiked Lamb	Azad	The Bunker, London
2017	All Places That the Eye of Heaven Visits	Thomas More	Globe Theatre, London / Shakespeare at the Abbey
2017	The Last Ones	Yakorev	Jermyn Street Theatre, London
2017	Creatives	Luis Perez	Edinburgh Fringe Festival
2018	Shirleymander	The CO	Playground Theatre, London
2019	A Song at Twilight	Felix (understudy)	Theatre Royal, Bath
2021	As You Like It	Duke Frederick / Silvius	Watermill Theatre, Newbury
2021	You Bury Me	Tamer	Edinburgh Fringe Festival
2022	Cabaret	Cliff Bradshaw	Playhouse Theatre, London
2022	After Elijah	—N/a	Writer; The Other Palace, London

== Audio ==
Year	Title	Role	Notes
2021	Doctor Who: The Lone Centurion	First Gladiator	Big Finish Productions
2021	Doctor Who: The Lone Centurion	Quinn	Big Finish Productions
