= Wedding Season (TV series) =

2022 British television series

- Genre: Action comedy; Romantic thriller
- Developed by: Oliver Lyttelton
- Directed by: George Kane
- Starring: Rosa Salazar; Gavin Drea
- Composer: Dan Deacon
- Country of origin: United Kingdom
- Original language: English
- No. of seasons: 1
- No. of episodes: 8

Production
- Executive producers: Oliver Lyttelton; Laurence Brown; Lilly Burns; Brooke Posch; Tony Hernandez; Toby Bruce; Chris Carey
- Producer: Dan Kay
- Production companies: Jax Media; Dancing Ledge Productions

Original release
- Network: Disney+
- Release: September 8, 2022

Wedding Season is an action comedy romantic thriller streaming television series created by Oliver Lyttelton for the Star content hub of Disney+. It was released on the Disney+ Star platform internationally, Star+ in Latin America and Hulu in the United States, September 8, 2022.

== Premise ==
A young man named Stefan objects at the wedding of Katie McConnell, with whom he has been having an affair at various weddings over the summer, only to be rejected. Hours later, Stefan is arrested and learns that Katie's new in-laws were poisoned at the reception and she has gone missing. Despite his suspicions of Katie, Stefan goes on the run with her to find out the truth.

== Cast and characters ==
=== Main ===
- Rosa Salazar as Katie
- Gavin Drea as Stefan
- Jade Harrison as DCI Metts
- Jamie Michie as DI Donahue
- Omar Baroud as Jackson
- Callie Cooke as Leila
- Bhav Joshi as Anil
- Ioanna Kimbook as Suji

=== Recurring ===
- George Webster as Hugo Delaney
- Liz Kingsman as Mary Delaney
- Ivan Kaye as Mr Delaney
- Tsion Habte
- Poppy Liu as Mitzi Yeung

== Episodes ==
No.	Title	Directed by	Written by	Original release date
1	"Episode 1"	George Kane	Oliver Lyttelton	September 8, 2022
Stefan Bridges, a young doctor, interrupts the wedding of a young woman named Katie McConnell and begs her to leave her would-be husband Hugo Delaney, but is rejected. A few hours later, Stefan is arrested and informed that the Delaneys were poisoned at their wedding reception and Katie has gone missing. He relates that he met Katie at the wedding of a mutual friend three months prior, which he attended with his friends Anil, Leila, Suji, and Jackson. At the reception, Stefan performed an emergency tracheotomy while intoxicated, and began a sporadic affair with Katie. To get him to cooperate, the officers in charge of the case, Metts and Donahue, attempt to blackmail Stefan with the possibility of losing his medical license. However, Katie crashes a car into the police headquarters and convinces Stefan to escape with her in the ensuing chaos.
2	"Episode 2"	George Kane	Temi Wilkey	September 8, 2022
Stefan and Katie make their way to a village north of Edinburgh, where Katie is sure that the family black sheep, Fred Delaney, will help them. Stefan grows frustrated with Katie's lack of transparency about the situation and suspicious of Fred. He convinces Katie that Fred is not to be trusted and the two escape just as mysterious men in pest control vans arrive at Fred's home. The two escape on a fishing boat across the lake. In flashbacks, Stefan left another friend's wedding to accidentally crash Katie's engagement party, where she makes him pretend to be a school friend to convince Hugo's suspicious father that her past is legitimate. She eventually admits to Mr. Delaney that her well-off past was a lie and she is from a humble fishing family.
3	"Episode 3"	George Kane	Temi Wilkey	September 8, 2022
Stefan and Katie have made their way to a lakeside diner. Angry with Katie, Stefan goes on a walk, only to return and find Katie in the middle of fighting the men who were pursuing them. Stefan manages to hijack the van they throw Katie in and the two escape, driving towards the men's base of operations —a Glasgow nightclub. Stefan attempts to phone his friends, only to be accosted by an unknown man in the phone booth. In flashbacks, Stefan and his friends attend the wedding of the son of the Delaneys' lawyer. Stefan catches Katie trying to break into the lawyer's laptop for an unknown reason.
4	"Episode 4"	Laura Scrivano	Oliver Lyttelton	September 8, 2022
Katie and Stefan's captor reveals himself to be Conrad, her ex-husband, who reveals that she used to go by Keira Dunmore and the men pursuing them are part of a criminal group known as the Block. He interrogates the two about Katie's hen do, where she convinced Stefan to accompany her to the Delaneys' casino in Las Vegas. Katie helped Stefan win at blackjack by card counting, knowing this would distract security enough for her to break in and steal a drive. To throw security off their tail they pretended to get married by a Prince impersonator. Leila angrily called Stefan for prioritizing Katie over Anil's stag weekend. In the present, Conrad explains that he intends to surrender them to the Block to get back in the group's good graces. Katie is able to escape her bindings and leaves Stefan, only to see the police arrive. Stefan and Conrad are both arrested. Metts and Donahue inform Stefan that the weekend before her wedding, Katie was purchasing ingredients with which to make potassium chloride, the chemical that killed the Delaneys.
5	"Episode 5"	George Kane	Daran Jonno Johnson	September 8, 2022
Stefan is taken into police custody and Leila arrives to represent him. Donahue and Metts question him about his whereabouts on the day of Anil and Leila's wedding, where he served as the best man. Stefan relates that he had been kidnapped by Hugo and his bodyguard Bruce, who threatened him about his closeness to Katie and left him naked in a cemetery. Katie had driven Stefan up to the Delaney home but declines to help him further. Stefan successfully stole his clothes and the rings back, but overheard Katie telling Hugo over the phone that Stefan is obsessed with her. Ani and Leila's wedding was successful; at the reception, Stefan told Katie to leave. In the present, Jackson and Suji send photographs of Bruce to the police. Metts has Stefan transferred to a separate cell, where she tries to kill him by having him hanged from the ceiling.
6	"Episode 6"	Laura Scrivano	Louise Nesbitt	September 8, 2022
Flashbacks shows Katie's father Paul was fatally stabbed at his wedding after being threatened to sign papers outside their pub. She married Conrad, who was the boss of the men who killed Paul, and had him arrested. Conrad informed her that the Delaneys were the ones behind the hit on Paul. In the present, Donahue manages to rescue Stefan but is unable to arrest Metts. Katie visits her wedding designer Vince, who suspects the Block backed the Delaneys for years but may have had them killed, and that there is an upcoming wedding in Texas intending to link the Block to the Texas mob. Donahue brings Stefan to Katie, who decides to turn herself in, but the group is attacked by the Block. Katie admits to Stefan that she had secretly edited her prenup to inherit the building built over her father's pub in the event of a divorce due to infidelity. The two plan to sneak into the Texas wedding, where Metts will be in attendance.
7	"Episode 7"	Laura Scrivano	Oliver Lyttelton	September 8, 2022
Stefan's friends learn from Donahue that Metts is allergic to sesame. Stefan and Katie successfully infiltrate the Texas wedding, steal Metts' EpiPen, and withhold it long enough so she can confess to the murder of the Delaneys, which she had done on orders from the Block. Metts tells Stefan that Hugo's father had received a double dose of poison, because Katie really had planned to poison him at the wedding in revenge for his role in her father's death. Stefan is appalled that Katie had lied to him about her innocence. An emotional Katie kidnaps the bride, Mitzi, steals the deed to the building the Delaneys built over her father's pub, and drives away.
8	"Episode 8"	Laura Scrivano	Oliver Lyttelton	September 8, 2022
Out of gasoline, Katie holds Mitzi hostage in an empty church in the Texan desert while admitting to her that she loves Stefan. Metts arrives with Stefan, pointing a gun at his head to force Katie to come out and surrender Mitzi. A firefight ensues, during which Donahue arrives. Donahue attempts to reason with Metts, but she shoots him. The leader of the Block arrives at the scene. Stefan claims they were successfully able to upload Metts' confession, meaning the terms of Katie's prenup stands and the building belongs to her. Metts is killed, and Katie negotiates away the rights to the building she wanted in exchange for their freedom. In the aftermath, Katie, now Stefan's girlfriend, attends the season's final wedding with the rest of his friend group. As she approaches the car, it explodes, leaving her fate unclear.

== Production ==
In late July 2021, Disney EMEA ordered the series from Jax Media and Dancing Ledge Productions with Rosa Salazar attached as the female lead. In November 2021, the series on boarded Gavin Drea as the male lead while Jamie Michie and Jade Harrison were added in supporting roles.

== Release ==
The series premiered internationally on Disney+ under the dedicated streaming hub Star on September 8, 2022, on Star+ in Latin America, and on Hulu in the United States.

== Reception ==
=== Critical reception ===
On the review aggregator website Rotten Tomatoes, the series holds a 75% approval rating, with an average rating of 6.60/10 based on 20 reviews. The critics consensus on the website states, "Wedding Season's mashing of discordant genres can make for a less than perfect union, but nobody will object to the compelling chemistry between Gavin Drea and Rosa Salazar." Metacritic assigned the series a weighted average score of 71 out of 100, based on reviews from 13 critics, indicating "generally favorable reviews".

=== Accolades ===
Wedding Season was nominated for Best Comedy at the 2023 Broadcast Awards.
