= Difret =

2014 Ethiopian film

- Theatrical release poster
- Directed by: Zeresenay Berhane Mehari
- Written by: Zeresenay Berhane Mehari
- Produced by: Mehret Mandefro; Leelai Demoz; Zeresenay Mehari
- Starring: Meron Getnet; Tizita Hagere
- Cinematography: Monika Lenczewska
- Edited by: Agnieszka Glińska
- Music by: Dave Eggar; David Schommer
- Production companies: Haile Addis Pictures; Truth Aid
- Release dates: 18 January 2014 (Sundance); 25 September 2014 (Ethiopia)
- Running time: 99 minutes
- Country: Ethiopia
- Language: Amharic
- Box office: $57,2013

Difret (Amharic: ድፍረት, lit. 'Courage') is a 2014 Ethiopian drama film written and directed by Zeresenay Berhane Mehari. The film had its premiere in-competition at the 2014 Sundance Film Festival where it won the World Cinematic Dramatic Audience Award. Angelina Jolie served as the executive producer of the film.

The film later premiered at the 64th Berlin International Film Festival in the Panorama section, where it won the Audience Award. It was selected as the Ethiopian entry for the Best Foreign Language Film at the 87th Academy Awards, but was not nominated.

The title literally translates as "courage", "audacity", but can also be a euphemism for "the act of being raped."

== Plot ==
The film chronicles a legal-precedent setting court case that outlawed the kidnapping of child brides (ጠለፋ tʼelefa) in Ethiopia. It tells the story of a 14-year-old girl, Hirut Assefa (based on Aberash Bekele), who is kidnapped on her way home from school and subsequently grabs a rifle and tries to escape, but ends up shooting her would-be husband. In her village, the practice of abduction into marriage is common and one of Ethiopia's oldest traditions. Meaza Ashenafi, the founder of the Ethiopian Women Lawyers Association (EWLA), arrives from the city to have her team represent Hirut and argue that she acted in self-defence.

== Cast ==
- Meron Getnet as Meaza Ashenafi
- Tizita Hagere as Hirut Assefa

== Controversy ==
The film was temporarily banned in September 2014 for allegedly giving "too much credit" to Ashenafi, according to a complaint by Bekele, on whose experience the film was based. The case settled out of court and the ban was ultimately lifted. The film's director, Mehari, apologized to Bekele for "any misperception and for any harm that [they] may have caused." The film subsequently enjoyed a successful theatrical run in Ethiopia and kicked off its educational outreach efforts that are focused on raising awareness about the issue of child marriage. Ashenafi's leadership and administration of EWLA during this time is the reason she has received several international human rights awards including the Africa Prize of The Hunger Project for her work defending vulnerable women and children in Ethiopia.

== Reception ==
Difret received mixed reviews upon its premiere at the 2014 Sundance Film Festival. Dennis Harvey of Variety, said in his review that "'Difret' presents an important message, albeit in rather clunky narrative terms. More showing and less telling would have made this fact-inspired drama by Zeresenay Berhane Mehari as artistically compelling as it is informative. Still, fests and other outlets attracted to social-justice issues will queue up for this relatively rare export-ready Ethiopian feature." Boyd van Hoeij in his review for The Hollywood Reporter called the film "A quiet and powerful drama, based on a true story, that relies on familiar storytelling tropes." The film has a score of 58% on Metacritic.

== Accolades ==
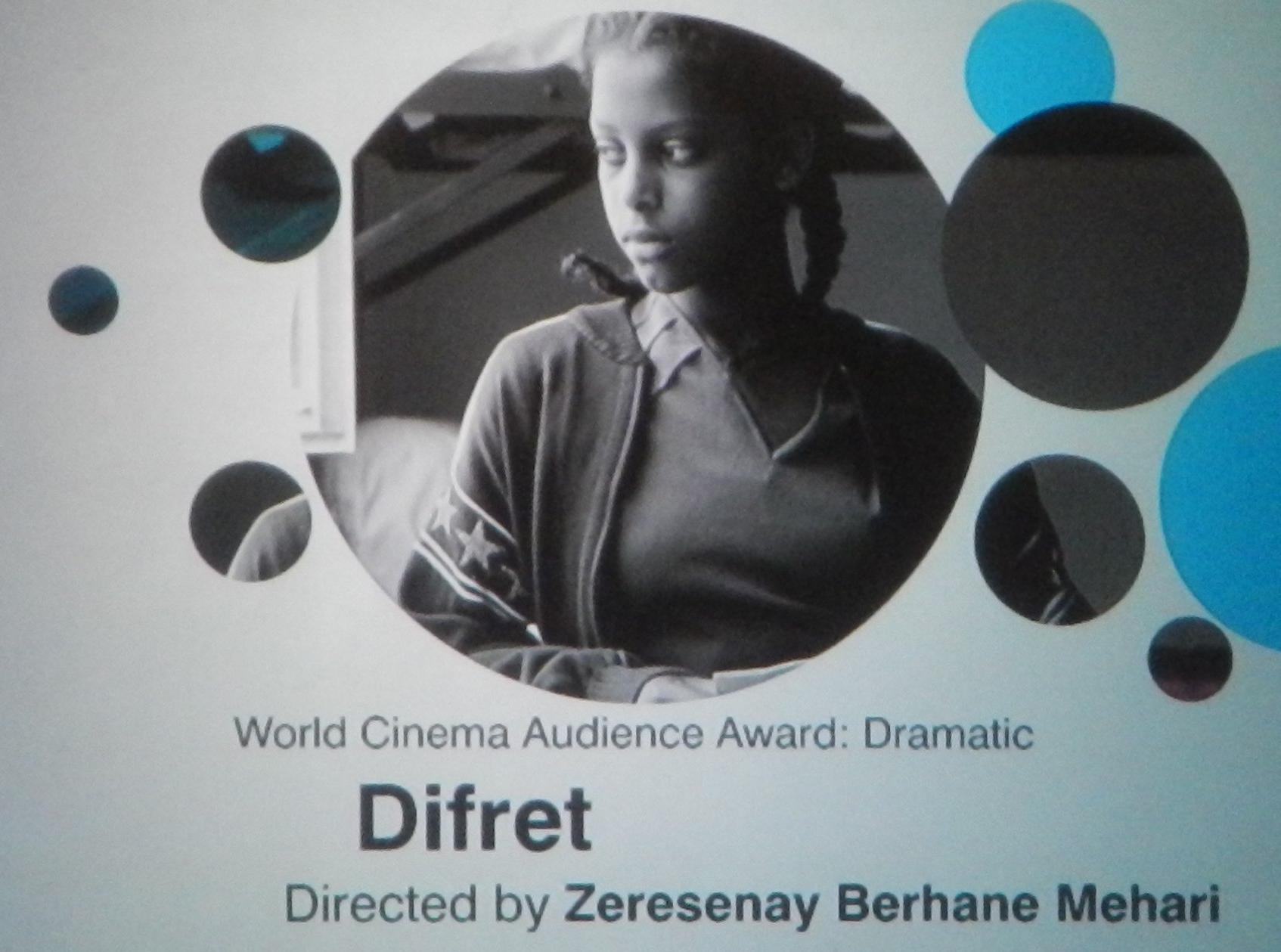
Difret wins the Audience Award at the 2014 Sundance Film Festival.

Year	Award	Category	Recipient	Result
2014	Sundance Film Festival	World Cinema Grand Jury Prize: Dramatic	Zeresenay Berhane Mehari	Nominated
2014	Sundance Film Festival	Audience Award: World Cinema Dramatic	Zeresenay Berhane Mehari	Won
2014	Berlin International Film Festival	Panorama Audience Award	Zeresenay Berhane Mehari	Won

== See also ==
- List of submissions to the 87th Academy Awards for Best Foreign Language Film
- List of Ethiopian submissions for the Academy Award for Best Foreign Language Film
