= Resistance (miniseries) =

- Title card
- Also known as: Rebellion Season 2
- Genre: Historical fiction Spy fiction
- Created by: Colin Teevan
- Written by: Colin Teevan
- Directed by: Catherine Morshead
- Starring: Brian Gleeson; Aoife Duffin; Simone Kirby; Natasha O'Keeffe; Gavin Drea
- Composer: Vince Pope
- Country of origin: Ireland
- Original language: English
- No. of episodes: 5

Production
- Producers: Catherine Magee; Catherine Dunne
- Cinematography: David Marsh
- Editor: Justin Krish
- Camera setup: Multi-camera
- Running time: 52 minutes per episode
- Production companies: Zodiak Media Ireland; Touchpaper TV; RTÉ

Original release
- Network: RTÉ One
- Release: 6 January – 3 February 2019

Related
- Rebellion

Resistance (released as Rebellion Season 2 on Netflix) is a 2019 television miniseries written by Colin Teevan for Irish broadcaster RTÉ, dramatising the events surrounding the Irish War of Independence.

Set during the time of Bloody Sunday in 1920, it is a sequel to the 2016 mini-series, Rebellion, which was set during the 1916 Easter Rising. In Netflix's 2025 presentation of this series, Resistance is shown as season two of Rebellion.

== Production ==
Filming began in October 2016.

== Cast ==
=== Characters returning from Rebellion ===
- Brian Gleeson – Jimmy Mahon, a 1916 veteran now serving with the IRA.
- Jordanne Jones – Minnie Mahon
- Jaeylynne Wallace Ruane – Sadie Mahon
- Millie Donnelly – Gracie Mahon
- Michael Ford-FitzGerald – Harry Butler, wealthy banker from whom the rebel government seek funds.
- Gavin Drea – Michael Collins, IRA Director of Intelligence, a charismatic and headstrong leader. (Collins was played by Sebastian Thommen in Rebellion)

=== New characters ===
- David Wilmot – Patrick (Paddy) Mahon, Jimmy's brother, a member of the Royal Irish Constabulary (RIC).
- Stanley Townsend – Daniel Shea, an Irish-American US Senator, sympathetic to the independence movement.
- Simone Kirby – Ursula Sweeney, Dublin Castle codebreaker
- Conall Keating – Joey Bradley, IRA gunman.
- Aoife Duffin – Éithne Drury, republican journalist
- Natasha O'Keeffe – Agnes Moore, Ursula's sister, a lawyer working in the Dáil Courts
- Catherine Walker – Constance Butler, republican sympathiser; wife of Harry
- Fergal McElherron – Maurice Jacobs, solicitor and agent for the rebel government.
- Ben Smith – Robbie Lennox, English journalist and socialist. Based on the historical F. Digby Hardy.
- Andrew Bennet – Arthur Griffith, Minister for Home Affairs and vice-president of Sinn Féin
- Craig Parkinson – Captain David McLeod, British soldier.
- Conor MacNeill – Diarmuid McWilliams, republican journalist.
- Aoibhínn McGinnity – Josephine Carmichael, cabaret singer and Harry Butler's mistress.
- Matthew Hopkinson – Albert Finlay, a hot-headed Black and Tan
- Paul Ritter – General Ormonde Winter, Chief of Intelligence in Dublin Castle
- Tom Bennett – Mark Sturgis, Winter's opposite number in the British civil service.
- Hugh O'Conor – Dr. Lawrence Moore, doctor with republican sympathies. Husband to Agnes.
- Imogen Doel – Lily Lawlor, typist in Dublin Castle
- Barbara Bergin – Mrs. Lyons, landlady
- Brian Doherty – Frank Brogan, IRA leader

== Episode list ==
No.	Title	Original release date
1	"Episode 1"	6 January 2019
2	"Episode 2"	13 January 2019
3	"Episode 3"	20 January 2019
4	"Episode 4"	27 January 2019
5	"Episode 5"	3 February 2019

== Reception ==
The first episode was criticised for departure from historical fact; Teevan had already resigned himself to such, he admitted in an interview with The Irish Times.

The Irish Catholic criticised what they called the "nasty nuns" subplot; in the historical event that the adoption storyline was based on, Josephine Marchment Brown, a widow working in Victoria Barracks in Cork, lost custody of her son to her in-laws who took the boy to Wales. The IRA kidnapped the boy back for her in return, according to the plot, for her passing information to them. Foreign adoptions from mother-and-baby homes, of the kind depicted in Resistance, did not begin until the 1940s.

Chris Wasser of the Irish Independent awarded the first episode three stars, saying "What we have here is a reasonably capable and competent drama that, though rough around the edges, suggests we may be in for a stronger and tighter run than last time. […] It isn’t nearly as vital or as thrilling as it needs to be, and Catherine Morshead’s flat direction doesn’t help. But there is something here."

Website IrishCentral was more positive, saying "The first episode of Resistance is deliciously plotted with loyalty, betrayal, irony, but most of all, the bravery of ordinary Dubliners taking on the greatest intelligence service in the world and, as history tells us, eventually winning. Resistance is not to be missed."
