= Brian Gleeson (actor) =

Irish actor (born 1987)

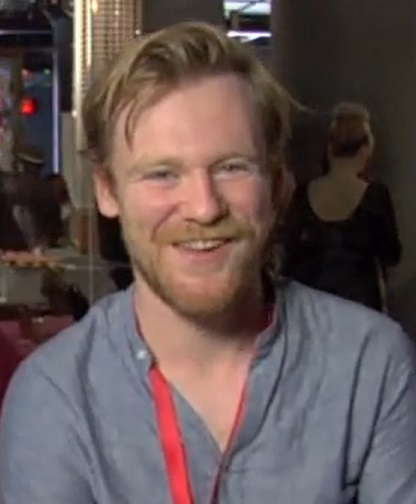
- Gleeson in 2013
- Born: 14 November 1987 (age 38); Dublin, Ireland
- Other name: Breen Gleeson
- Education: Gaiety's Youth Theatre Company
- Occupation: Actor
- Years active: 2006–present
- Father: Brendan Gleeson
- Relatives: Domhnall Gleeson (brother)

Brian Gleeson (/ˈbriːən/ BREE-ən; born 14 November 1987) is an Irish actor. He was nominated for an Irish Film and Television Awards for the television series Love/Hate. He has appeared in the films Snow White and the Huntsman (2012) and Assassin's Creed (2016), and had regular roles in The Bisexual (2018), Resistance and Peaky Blinders (2019), Frank of Ireland (2021), and Bad Sisters (2022).

== Early life ==
Gleeson was born in Dublin, the son of actor Brendan Gleeson and his wife Mary Weldon. He has three brothers: Domhnall (also an actor), Fergus, and Rory. He grew up in Malahide, Dublin. As a child, he appeared in school plays, before joining the Gaiety's Youth Theatre Company.

== Career ==
Gleeson started acting in 2006, first appearing alongside his father in The Tiger's Tail directed by John Boorman, which was filmed the year he completed the Leaving Certificate. In 2010, Gleeson appeared as Hughie in the first season of Love/Hate, and earned a nomination for an Irish Film and Television Award for Best Actor in a Supporting Role (Television) for the role. He also appeared in the Hollywood film The Eagle. Gleeson was featured in the 2011 B.E.T. episode "Seth Goes to Ireland." He appeared in the 2012 film Snow White and the Huntsman. Gleeson portrayed the lead role in Standby opposite Jessica Paré in 2014. The same year, he filmed Tiger Raid, based on the Iraq War, in Jordan; it was released in 2016. Along with his father Brendan and brother Domhnall, Gleeson appeared in the Enda Walsh play The Walworth Farce in early 2015. He starred as Jimmy in the 2016 Irish drama series Rebellion, based on the 1916 Easter Rising.

In 2019, Gleeson starred as Jimmy McCavern in Peaky Blinders; although criticized for his version of a Glaswegian accent, his acting was praised.

== Filmography ==
=== Film ===
Year	Title	Role	Notes
2006	The Tiger's Tail	Connor O'Leary	
2009	What Will Survive of Us	John	Short
2010	Noreen	Frank Sheehan	Short
2010	Wake Wood	Martin O'Shea	
2011	The Eagle	Traveller #1	
2012	Snow White and the Huntsman	Gus	
2013	Coda		Short; voice role
2013	How to Be Happy	Cormac	
2013	Life's a Breeze	Hawk Man	
2013	The Stag	Simon	
2013	Stay	Liam Meehan	
2014	Darkness on the Edge of Town	Virgil O'Riley	
2014	Serious Swimmers	Justin	Short
2014	Standby	Alan	
2015	Black River		
2016	Tiger Raid	Joe	
2016	History's Future	Driver	
2016	Assassin's Creed	Joseph Lynch (young)	
2017	Logan Lucky	Sam Bang	
2017	Mother!	younger brother	
2017	Phantom Thread	Dr. Robert Hardy	
2019	Hellboy	Merlin	
2020	Death of a Ladies' Man	Ben O'Shea	
2026	Ink	Brian McConnell	

=== Television ===
Year	Title	Role	Notes
2007	Trouble in Paradise	Randy Little	2 episodes
2007–2009	Single-Handed	Cathal	7 episodes
2010	Love/Hate	Hughie Power / Hughie	4 episodes
2011	Primeval	Ray Lennon	1 episode
2012	Immaturity for Charity	Various	Television movie
2014	Quirke	Sinclair	3 episodes
2015	Stonemouth	Powell Imrie	2 episodes
2016	Rebellion	Jimmy Mahon	5 episodes
2018	Taken Down	Wayne Deevy	6 episodes
2018	The Bisexual	Gabe	6 episodes
2019	Catastrophe	Ciaran	Episode #4.4
2019	Resistance	Jimmy Mahon	5 episodes
2019	Peaky Blinders	Jimmy McCavern	Series 5
2021	Frank of Ireland	Frank Marron	6 episodes
2022–2023	The Lazarus Project	Ross	9 episodes
2022–2024	Bad Sisters	Thomas Claffin	11 episodes
2023	The Mandalorian	Brendol Hux	Episode: "Chapter 23: The Spies"
2023	Top Boy	Tadgh McGee	3 episodes
2025	Atomic	Mark Ellis	4 episodes
2026	Under Salt Marsh	Mac Jones	3 episodes

== Awards and nominations ==
Year	Award	Category	Result	Work
2011	Irish Film and Television Awards	Best Actor in a Supporting Role in Television	Nominated	Love/Hate
2021	Irish Film and Television Awards	Best Actor in a Supporting Role in Film	Nominated	Death of a Ladies' Man
