= Gavin Drea =

Irish actor (born 1990)

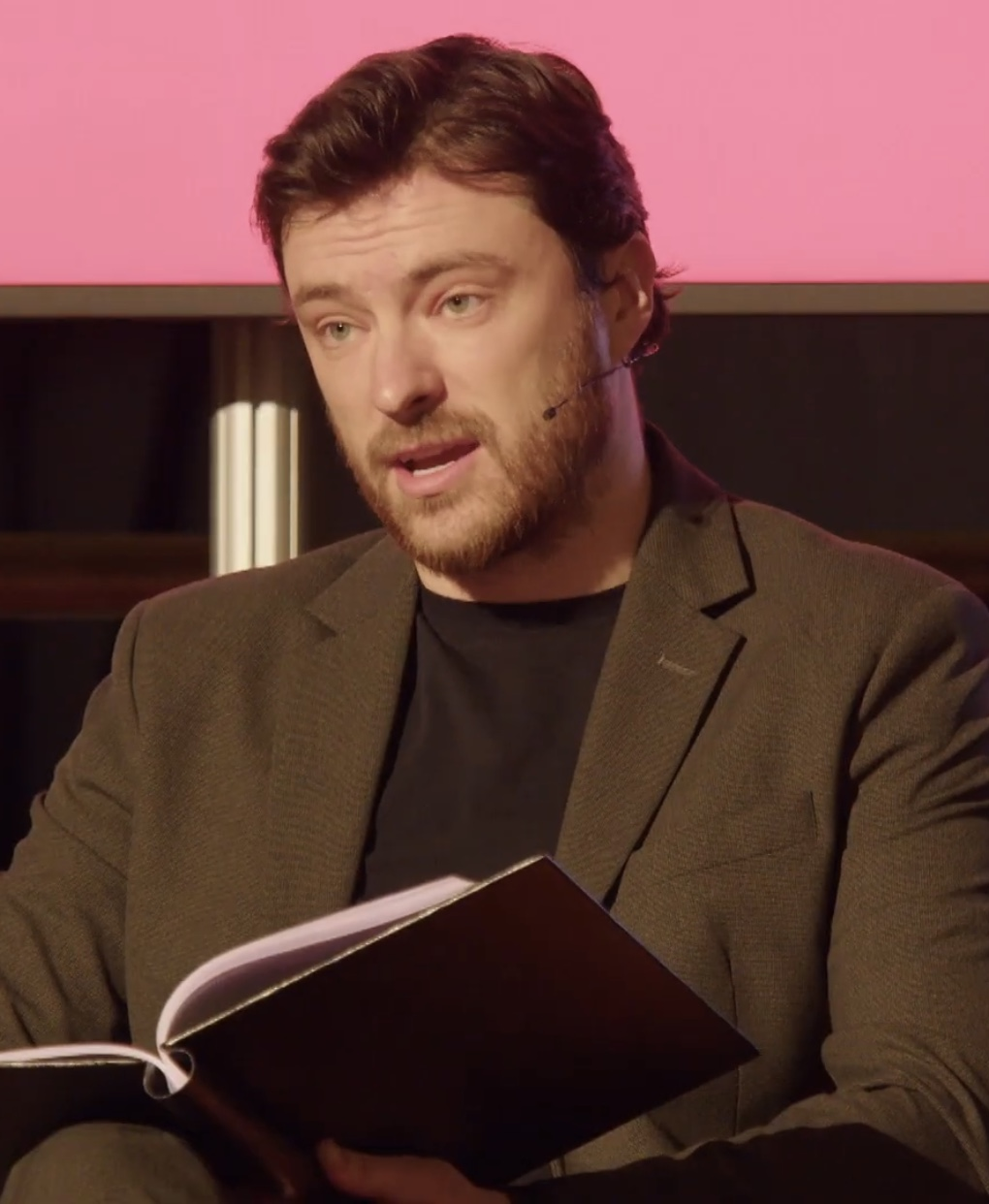
- Drea at the British Library in 2023
- Born: February 1990 (age 36); Dublin, Ireland
- Education: University College Dublin (BA)
- Years active: 2010–present

Gavin Drea (born February 1990) is an Irish actor and comedian. He is known for his roles in the RTÉ series Love/Hate (2011) and Resistance (2019), the BBC drama My Mother and Other Strangers (2017), the Star series Wedding Season (2022) and the Apple TV+ series Surface (2025). His voice work includes Cyberpunk 2077 (2020).

== Early life and education ==
Gavin Drea was born in Dublin. He attended Gonzaga College. He graduated from University College Dublin in 2011 with a Bachelor of Arts with majors in English and film studies.

== Career ==
Drea made his television debut a 2010 episode of the TV3 series Jack Taylor. In 2011, he joined the cast of the RTÉ One drama Love/Hate for its second season as Luke. The following year, he made his feature film debut in Lenny Abrahamson's What Richard Did. Drea was cast in the Druid Theatre Company production of A Whistle in the Dark, which was staged in Ireland, the United Kingdom, and the United States. For his performance as Des, Drea was nominated for the Irish Theatre Award for Best Supporting Actor.

This was followed in 2014 by roles in Philadelphia, Here I Come! at the Lyric Theatre, Belfast and Breaking Dad at the Gaiety Theatre, Dublin. That same year, Drea founded the comedy collective Dreamgun with Stephen Colfer, Heber Hanly and James McDonnell, through which they had a comedy show and podcast titled Dreamgun Film Reads.

Drea returned to television when he appeared in the 2016 History Channel docudrama Barbarians Rising. In 2017, he played Barney Quinn in the BBC Northern Ireland drama My Mother and Other Strangers and appeared in the space opera film Valerian and the City of a Thousand Planets. The following year, he played Laertes in Hamlet at the Gate Theatre. He would go on to reprise the role at St. Ann's Warehouse in Brooklyn. He also starred in the Irish film We Ourselves.

Drea portrayed Michael Collins in the 2019 RTÉ miniseries Resistance, taking over the role from Sebastian Thommen, who had portrayed Collins in Rebellion back in 2016. Also in 2019, Drea appeared in Blood Wedding at the Young Vic in London. He had small film roles in Sweetness in the Belly and My Salinger Year.

In 2022, Drea starred as Stefan opposite Rosa Salazar in the series Wedding Season, made for the Star platform on Disney+. Drea performed his own wire stunt for the series. He also had recurring roles in the Netflix series Vikings: Valhalla as Eadric Streona and the Amazon Prime Video miniseries adaptation of Daisy Jones & the Six as Nicky Fitzgerald, Daisy's (Riley Keogh) antagonistic husband.

== Acting credits ==
=== Film ===
Year	Title	Role	Notes
2012	What Richard Did	Stephen O'Brien	
2014	Cruelty	Jude	Short film
2017	Valerian and the City of a Thousand Planets	Sergent Cooper	
2018	Vanilla	Smell	Short film
2018	We Ourselves	Mikey	
2019	Break Us	Mark	Short film
2019	Sweetness in the Belly	Phillip	
2020	My Salinger Year	Mark	
2024	Sharp Corner	Erickson	

=== Television ===
Year	Title	Role	Notes
2010	Jack Taylor	Christian Tracey	Episode: "The Priest"
2011	Love/Hate	Luke	Season 2 (6 episodes)
2016	Éirí Amach Amú	Mick	1 episode
2016	Barbarians Rising	Alaric	Docudrama (2 episodes)
2017	My Mother and Other Strangers	Barney Quinn	Miniseries
2018	The Alienist	Roundsmen Barclay	Episode: "Silver Smile"
2018	Origin	Andrew	Episode: "A Total Stranger"
2019	Resistance	Michael Collins	Main role
2022	Vikings: Valhalla	Eadric Streona	Season 1 (3 episodes)
2022	Wedding Season	Stefan	Main role
2023	Daisy Jones & the Six	Nicky Fitzgerald	Miniseries (3 episodes)
2024	Baby Reindeer	Shea	Miniseries (1 episode)
2025	Surface	Callum Walsh	Season 2

=== Video games ===
Year	Title	Role	Notes
2019	World War Z	Cutter II	
2020	Assassin's Creed Valhalla	Flann Sinna	
2020	Cyberpunk 2077	Vincent "V"	
2023	Cyberpunk 2077: Phantom Liberty	Vincent "V"	

=== Theatre ===
Year	Title	Role	Notes
2012	DruidMurphy: A Whistle in the Dark	Des	International tour
2014	Philadelphia, Here I Come!	Private Gar	Lyric Theatre, Belfast
2014	Breaking Dad	Traolach	Gaiety Theatre, Dublin
2015	DruidShakespeare	Various	Ireland tour
2017	Tribes	Daniel	Gate Theatre, Dublin
2018	Hamlet	Laertes	Gate Theatre, Dublin / St. Ann's Warehouse, Brooklyn
2019	Blood Wedding	Leonardo	Young Vic, London

== Awards and nominations ==
Year	Award	Category	Work	Result	Ref.
2013	Irish Theatre Awards	Best Supporting Actor	DruidMurphy: A Whistle in the Dark	Nominated	

== See also ==
- List of Irish actors
