= Greendale Community School =

Former secondary school, Kilbarrack, Dublin, Ireland

Greendale Community School was a community school, a form of state-sponsored secondary school, in the Northside suburb of Kilbarrack, Dublin, Ireland, located near the boundary with Raheny.

== Location ==
Greendale was situated on c. 4.5 acres (18,000 m^{2}) of land, near Kilbarrack DART suburban rail station and Greendale Shopping Centre, and its grounds included a basketball court once used by Killester Basketball club and later by KUBS Basket Ball Club.

== History ==
=== Construction ===
Greendale was built in the mid-1970s, opening in 1975, with capacity for not less than 800 pupils. The school quickly exceeded its numbers, and extension work in the early 1980s allowed for up to 900 students. By 1996, however, core pupil numbers were down to 449, then 215 at the start of the 2003–2004 school year, and 160 in 2006. In addition to the day pupils, Greendale offered a range of night courses and adult education initiatives.

=== Closure ===
According to the Minister for Education, the trustees of Greendale made a decision in March 2004 to close the school to new entrants in September 2004, and to close altogether in June 2007. The property would then revert to the Department of Education. A major reunion of past pupils and teachers, covered by the press and national TV, was held in mid-February 2007.

There was some controversy about the closure, for reasons including the pending arrival of more than 2,500 homes within 2 miles (3.2 km) of Kilbarrack (many in Balgriffin and Baldoyle), the school's widely recognised work in education in a challenging environment, and the non-closure of what some saw as less-progressive, non co-educational schools nearby.

As of April 2007, it was announced that the school premises would continue to be used for educational purposes.

== Staff ==
Former teachers at the school include playwright and film director Paul Mercier, Booker Prize winner Roddy Doyle, writer Catherine Dunne, and former Dublin Football midfielder Brian Mullins. Artistic director of the Passion Machine Theatre Company Paul Mercier later stated that "Things are changing at a furious pace. But in reality things are disappearing in society that were working. And Greendale was working."

The principal of the school from opening to closure was Anton Carroll.

== Sexual abuse ==
In 2020, former vice-principal and teacher Patrick Potts died several days prior to a court appearance on charges of sexual abuse of students at Greendale; the charges date to his tenure at the school in the early 1980s. Alumni who had accused Potts have expressed frustration over losing the opportunity to settle the allegations via a court proceeding.
