= List of awards and nominations received by Brendan Gleeson =

Brendan Gleeson awards and nominations
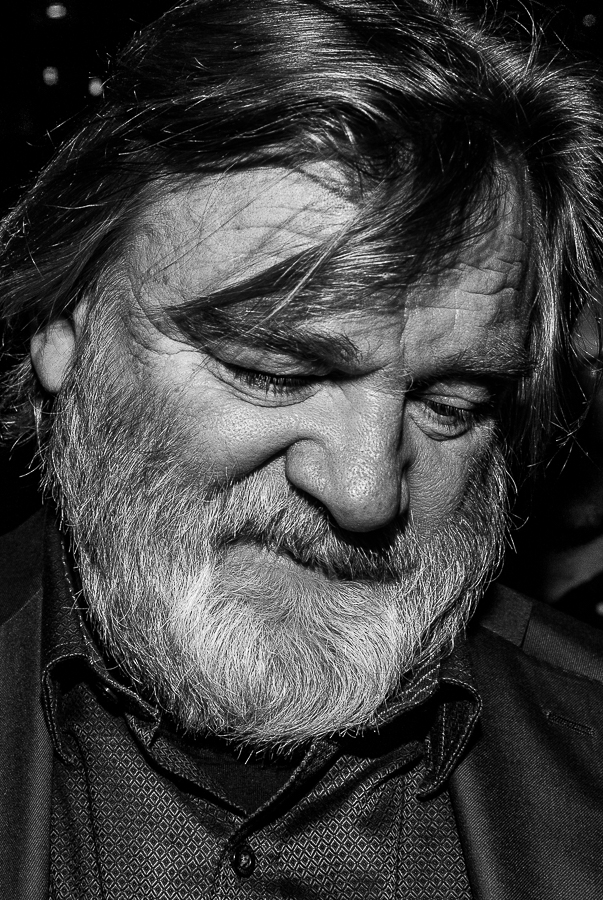
- Gleeson at the British Independent Film Awards 2014
Awards and nominations
Award	Wins	Nominations
Academy Awards	0	1
BAFTA Awards	0	3
Emmy Awards	1	2
Golden Globe Awards	0	5

Brendan Gleeson is an Irish actor known for his performances in television and film.

He has received various awards including a Primetime Emmy Award for Outstanding Lead Actor in a Limited Series or Movie for his role as Winston Churchill in the HBO film Into the Storm (2009). He has also received nominations for two BAFTA Awards (In Bruges (2008), and Into the Storm (2009)) and five Golden Globe Awards (In Bruges (2008), Into the Storm (2009), The Guard (2011), The Comey Rule (2020), and The Banshees of Inisherin (2022).

== Major associations ==
=== Academy Awards ===
Year	Category	Nominated work	Result	Ref.
2022	Best Supporting Actor	The Banshees of Inisherin	Nominated	

=== BAFTA Awards ===
Year	Category	Nominated work	Result	Ref.
British Academy Film Award
2008	Best Actor in a Supporting Role	In Bruges	Nominated	
2022	Best Actor in a Supporting Role	The Banshees of Inisherin	Nominated	
British Academy Television Award
2009	Best Actor in a Leading Role	Into the Storm	Nominated	

=== Emmy Awards ===
Year	Category	Nominated work	Result	Ref.
Primetime Emmy Awards
2009	Outstanding Lead Actor in a Miniseries or a Movie	Into the Storm	Won	
2022	Outstanding Actor in a Short Form Comedy or Drama Series	State of the Union	Nominated	

=== Golden Globe Awards ===
Year	Category	Nominated work	Result	Ref.
2008	Best Actor - Motion Picture Musical or Comedy	In Bruges	Nominated	
2009	Best Actor - Miniseries or Television Film	Into the Storm	Nominated	
2011	Best Actor - Motion Picture Musical or Comedy	The Guard	Nominated	
2020	Best Supporting Actor - Series, Miniseries or Television Film	The Comey Rule	Nominated	
2022	Best Supporting Actor - Motion Picture	The Banshees of Inisherin	Nominated	

=== Screen Actors Guild Awards ===
Year	Category	Nominated work	Result	Ref.
2022	Outstanding Cast in a Motion Picture	The Banshees of Inisherin	Nominated	
2022	Outstanding Performance by a Male Actor in a Supporting Role	The Banshees of Inisherin	Nominated	

== Miscellaneous awards ==
=== British Independent Film Award ===
Year	Category	Nominated work	Result	Ref.
2008	Best Actor	In Bruges	Nominated	
2011	Best Actor	The Guard	Nominated	
2014	Best Actor	Calvary	Won	
2015	Best Supporting Actor	Suffragette	Won	

=== Irish Film & Television Awards ===
Year	Category	Nominated work	Result	Ref.
1999	Best Actor in a Male Role	The General	Nominated	
1999	Best Actor in a Male Role	I Went Down	Nominated	
2003	Best Actor in a Lead Role - Film	Wild About Harry	Nominated	
2007	Best Actor in a Lead Role – Film	Studs	Nominated	
2008	Best Actor in a Lead Role – Film	In Bruges	Nominated	
2009	Best Actor in a Lead Role - Television	Into the Storm	Won	
2010	Best Actor in a Supporting Role – Film	Perrier's Bounty	Nominated	
2011	Best Actor in a Lead Role – Film	The Guard	Nominated	
2011	Best Actor in a Supporting Role – Film	Albert Nobbs	Nominated	
2014	Best Actor in a Lead Role – Film	Calvary	Won	
2017	Best Actor in a Supporting Role - Film	Trespass Against Us	Nominated	
2018	Best Actor in a Lead Role – Television	Mr. Mercedes	Nominated	
2019	Best Actor in a Lead Role – Television	Mr. Mercedes	Nominated	
2020	Best Actor in a Lead Role – Television	The Comey Rule	Nominated	
2023	Best Actor in a Supporting Role - Film	The Banshees of Inisherin	Won	

=== National Society of Film Critics ===
Year	Category	Nominated work	Result	Ref.
1997	Best Actor	I Went Down	Nominated	
1998	Best Actor	The General	Nominated	

=== Satellite Awards ===
Year	Category	Nominated work	Result	Ref.
1999	Best Actor – Motion Picture Drama	The General	Nominated	
2008	Best Actor – Motion Picture Musical or Comedy	In Bruges	Nominated	
2009	Best Actor - Miniseries or Television Film	Into the Storm	Won	
2011	Satellite Award for Best Actor – Motion Picture	The Guard	Nominated	
2017	Best Actor in a Television Series Drama	Mr. Mercedes	Nominated	
2018	Best Actor in a Television Series Drama	Mr. Mercedes	Won	
2019	Best Actor in a Television Series Drama	Mr. Mercedes	Nominated	
2022	Best Actor in a Supporting Role	The Banshees of Inisherin	Nominated	

== Critics awards ==
=== Detroit Film Critics Society ===
Year	Category	Nominated work	Result	Ref.
2014	Best Actor	Calvary	Nominated	

=== National Board of Review ===
Year	Category	Nominated work	Result	Ref.
2022	Best Supporting Actor	The Banshees of Inisherin	Won	

=== San Diego Film Critics Society ===
Year	Category	Nominated work	Result	Ref.
2014	Best Actor	Calvary	Won	
2023	Best Supporting Actor	The Banshees of Inisherin	Won	
