= Barbarians Rising =

American docudrama television series

- Genre: Docudrama
- Written by: Lindsey Shapero; Oliver Nilsson-Julien; Chris Fallon; Colin Heber Percy; Lyal Watson
- Directed by: Simon George; Declan O'Dwyer; Maurice Sweeney
- Narrated by: Michael Ealy
- Country of origin: United States
- Original language: English
- No. of seasons: 1
- No. of episodes: 4

Production
- Executive producers: Adam Bullmore; Joe Cushing; Simon George
- Producers: Michael Waterhouse; Chloe Leland
- Cinematography: Richard Kendrick; Gary Clarke
- Editors: Paul Holland; Lewis Albrow; David Barrett
- Production company: October Films

Original release
- Network: History Channel
- Release: June 6 – June 27, 2016

Barbarians Rising is an American docudrama television series which aired on History Channel. The series is executive produced by Adam Bullmore and produced by Chloe Leland and Michael Waterhouse. It premiered on June 6, 2016.

== Synopsis ==
The series is told from the perspective of leaders of peoples that fought Rome, who were termed barbarians by the Romans from the Greek word Βάρβαρος. These individuals were famous for challenging the rule of Rome. Depictions of these leaders and historical events are interspersed with brief commentary from modern scholars, historians and experts on military and public policy.

== Cast ==
- Nicholas Pinnock as Hannibal
- Jefferson Hall as Viriathus
- Ben Batt as Spartacus
- Tom Hopper as Arminius
- Kirsty Mitchell as Boudica
- Steven Waddington as Fritigern
- Gavin Drea as Alaric
- Emil Hostina as Attila
- Richard Brake as Geiseric

== Episodes ==
No.	Title	Original release date	U.S. viewers (millions)
1	"Resistance"	June 6, 2016	0.970
2	"Rebellion"	June 13, 2016	0.777
3	"Revenge"	June 20, 2016	0.894
4	"Ruin"	June 27, 2016	0.804

== Production ==
The History Channel ordered Barbarians Rising in December 2015. The cast, and the U.S. and Canadian premiere dates of June 6, 2016, were announced in May 2016.

== Broadcast ==
History (Canada) debuted the miniseries the same month as the United States and has it available for viewing On Demand for a full year. Barbarians Rising premiered in the United Kingdom on August 31, 2016. It is scheduled to premiere in Italy and Australia on July 4, and in much of Europe on July 17. The series will premiere in Germany in September 2016, and in Japan, Spain and Portugal in fall 2016.

== Reception ==
Despite the high number of viewers, the show received mixed reviews. Brian P. Kelly of The Wall Street Journal gave Barbarians Rising a mixed review, commending History Channel "for offering a show that deals with, well, history" while also noting "the series is slowed to the point of exhaustion by its lengthy re-enactments". Verne Gay of Newsday was also mixed in his appraisal of the miniseries giving it a grade of 'C' and remarking that "The sword-and-sandal mini-epics here are lavishly produced, and (for the most part) dramatically comatose."

== See also ==
- Barbarians (miniseries)
