= We Ourselves (film) =

2018 Irish film

- Theatrical film poster
- Directed by: Paul Mercier
- Written by: Paul Mercier
- Produced by: Anne Gately
- Starring: Declan Conlon; Gavin Drea; Caitríona Ennis; Aidan Gillen; Seána Kerslake; Paul Reid; Catherine Walker
- Cinematography: Ronan Fox
- Music by: John Dunne
- Release dates: July 12, 2018 (Galway); October 18, 2018 (Ireland)
- Running time: 96 mins.
- Country: Ireland
- Language: English

We Ourselves is a 2018 Irish drama film, written and directed by Paul Mercier. It stars Catherine Walker, Paul Reid, Gavin Drea, Seána Kerslake, Declan Conlon, Caitríona Ennis, and Aidan Gillen. It premiered at the Galway Film Fleadh in 2018, before being released in Ireland later that same year.

== Synopsis ==
An unconventional film dealing with the lives of seven Irish friends over a period of more than two decades.

== Cast ==
- Caitríona Ennis as Sarah
- Gavin Drea as Mikey
- Seána Kerslake as Una
- Paul Reid as Aonghus
- Catherine Walker as Eimear
- Aidan Gillen as Killian
- Declan Conlon as Declan (adult)
  - Stephen O'Leary as Declan (young)
- Thomas Sharkey as Abu
- Sarah Beth Henry as Katharina

== Reception ==
Jason Coyle of Scannain rated it a 3.5/5 and lauded filmmaker Paul Mercier, remarking "The monologues also have a cumulative quality, with each story told adding to the shared history and making the audience think again about certain characters."
