= Meron Getnet =

Ethiopian actress, journalist and activist

- ሜሮን ጌትነት

Personal details
- Born: Addis Ababa, Ethiopia
- Children: 2
- Occupation: Actress, political activist, journalist, poet

Meron Getnet is an Ethiopian actress, political activist, journalist and poet. A revered film and TV star, she is best known for her role as Meaza Ashenafi in the critically acclaimed film Difret.

== Film career ==
Starting in 2013, Meron Getnet starred in the Ethiopian drama TV series Dana in which she played a reporter named Helina.

Meron made her debut onto the international film scene in Difret in 2014, in which she played Meron Ashenafi, a female lawyer who vigorously fights patriarchal tradition.

In September 2014, at the premiere of Difret in Addis Ababa, the screening was abruptly cancelled due to a court order against its showing in Ethiopia. This left those in the audience stunned with Meron, who was in attendance, visibly distraught.

== Filmography ==
Film
Year	Title	Role
2012	Diplomat	Melat
2014	Difret	Meaza Ashenafi
2015	Yetekefelebet	
2015	Tirafikua	

TV
Year	Title	Role
2010	Gemena	
2013	Dana	Helina
2014	Live@Sundance	Herself
