= Sew le sew =

Ethiopian television drama series

- Genre: Thriller; Drama; Mystery
- Screenplay by: Mesfin Getachew
- Story by: Mesfin Getachew
- Directed by: Solomon Alemu Feleke; Mesfin Getachew
- Starring: Zinahbuzu Tsegaye; Abebe Balcha; Mahder Assefa; Solomon Abebe; Solomon Bogale; Mulualem Tadesse
- Music by: Daniel Kindey
- Country of origin: Ethiopia
- Original language: Amharic
- No. of seasons: 1
- No. of episodes: 140

Production
- Producers: Bisrat Gemechu; Mesfin Getachew; Daniel Haile; Solomon Alemu
- Running time: 45 minutes
- Production companies: Ethio Inter-educate Promotion; Lomi Pictures

Original release
- Network: ETV
- Release: 16 March 2011 – 23 July 2014

Sew le sew (Amharic: ሰው ለሰው) is an Ethiopian television drama series produced by Mesfin Getachew, Daniel Haile and Solomon Alemu, and is written by Tamiru Birhanu, Mesfin Getachew, Nebiyu Tekalegn, and Solomon Alemu Feleke. It originally aired on 16 March 2011 on EBC, formerly known as ETV. The series was concluded with its first season on 23 July 2014.

== Synopsis ==
This drama begins with an upper-class family. The family consists of Mesfin and his beloved wife Mahlet and their son Biruk. Mesfin and Mahlet struggle with a villainous character by the name of Asnake. He is an old friend of Mesfin's, but throughout time, Mesfin starts to realize the severity of Asnake's evil actions. The hostility Asnake produces creates a large span of chaos, not only disrupting Mesfin's family, but the families of many others. He has hidden criminal records of several illegal activities, such as smuggling goods and money laundering, and the police have come short to finding them. Mesfin's son Biruk falls in love with Medhanit, a girl who has a brother named Tamerat and an overly protective mother. Through a series of events, Asnake ends up sending one of his henchmen to kill Tamerat by choking him to death right outside of Mesfin's home. This single event is what pushes the story forward and creates multiple outlying storylines (minus Sosina and Adunya). Biruk, Mesfin's son, ends up being falsefully blamed for the murder of Tamerat.

After multiple events and characters going through what seems like hell, all the evidence ends up pointing back to Asnake. Knowing that he has lost, his burning jealousy enrages and he decides to kill Mesfin and Mahlet. He is not successful though and is shot by Mahlet at a top story of a construction building. Ultimately, he falls down to his death and is impaled by a stick of wood in his abdomen.

== Episodes ==
Season	Episodes	Originally released	
Season	Episodes	First released	Last released
1	140	16 March 2011	23 July 2014

== Controversy ==
While the series aired, the national public broadcaster Ethiopian Broadcasting Corporation, formerly known as Ethiopian Television, challenged the producers to conclude the series on 22 March 2014. ETV was also accused of the unwillingness to (DStv) not air a translated version of the drama.

== Cast and characters ==
Number	Actors	Character
1	Zinahbuzu Tsegaye	Mesfin
2	Abebe Balcha	Asnake
3	Mahder Assefa	Medhanit
4	Solomon Abebe	Biruk (Barich)
5	Solomon Bogale	Inspector Frezer
6	Mulualem Tadesse	Mahlet
7	Samson Tadesse	Biniyam
8	Genet Nigatu	Maritu
9	Shewit Kebede	Liya
10	Webalem Alebachew	
11	Kaleb ArayaSilassie	Leul
12	Getahun Solomon	
13	Hana Yohannes	Sossinna
14	Gedion Niggussie	
15	Belay Moreda	
16	Mersha Getahun	
17	Tadesse Mekonin	
18	Yigerem Dejene (Aster)	Adugna
