= Rebellion (miniseries) =

Irish drama serial

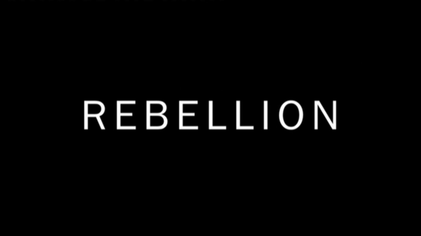
- Genre: Historical fiction
- Created by: Colin Teevan
- Written by: Colin Teevan
- Directed by: Aku Louhimies
- Starring: Charlie Murphy; Ruth Bradley; Sarah Greene; Brian Gleeson; Niamh Cusack; Michelle Fairley; Ian McElhinney; Michael Ford-FitzGerald; Paul Reid; Barry Ward; Tom Turner; Laurence O'Fuarain; Perdita Weeks; Andrew Simpson; Sophie Robinson
- Composer: Stephen Rennicks
- Country of origin: Ireland
- Original language: English
- No. of episodes: 5

Production
- Executive producers: Clare Alan; David Crean; Jane Gogan; Andrew Lowe; Rob Pursey; Colin Teevan; Christian Vesper
- Producer: Catherine Magee
- Production location: Dublin
- Cinematography: Tim Fleming
- Editor: Ben Mercer
- Camera setup: Multi-camera
- Running time: 52 minutes
- Production companies: RTÉ; Broadcasting Authority of Ireland; SundanceTV; Zodiak Media Ireland; Element Pictures; Touchpaper Television
- Budget: €6 million

Original release
- Network: RTÉ One
- Release: 3 January – 31 January 2016

Related
- Resistance

Rebellion is a 2016 historical drama television serial written and created by Colin Teevan for RTÉ. The series is a dramatisation of the events surrounding the 1916 Easter Rising. The story is told through the perspective of a group of fictional characters who live through the political events. The series was produced to commemorate the 100th anniversary of the Easter Rising. The ensemble cast includes Charlotte Murphy, Ruth Bradley, Sarah Greene, Brian Gleeson, Niamh Cusack, Michelle Fairley and Ian McElhinney.

In May 2015, RTÉ announced it would produce a drama series to commemorate the centennial anniversary of the 1916 Rising. Filming took place in Dublin in mid-2015. With a budget of €6 million, it became the most expensive drama ever to be produced by RTÉ. It was co-produced by Broadcasting Authority of Ireland and SundanceTV, in association with Zodiak Media Ireland, Element Pictures and Touchpaper Television.

The series was first broadcast on 3 January 2016 on RTÉ One and concluded on 31 January 2016. The series has received mixed reviews from television critics, who praised the cast and production values, however the plot, script and direction drew criticism. It was singled out by many for its historical inaccuracies. The first episode drew a strong audience share of 619,000 viewers. However, the viewership consistently dropped, with the finale gathering an average of 463,300 viewers.

The series was followed by a five-part sequel miniseries, Resistance which dramatised the events surrounding the Irish War of Independence. In Netflix's 2025 presentation of this series, Resistance is shown as season two of Rebellion.

== Plot ==
Rebellion depicts fictional characters in Dublin during the 1916 Rising. The commemorative drama begins with the outbreak of World War I. As expectations of a short and glorious campaign are dashed, social stability is eroded, and Irish nationalism comes to the fore. The tumultuous events that follow are seen through the eyes of a group of friends from Dublin, Belfast, and London as they play vital and conflicting roles in the narrative of Ireland's independence.

== Cast ==
- Brian Gleeson as Jimmy Mahon, soldier for the Irish rebellion.
- Charlie Murphy as Elizabeth Butler, medic for the Irish rebellion; fiancee of Stephen Duffy Lyons.
- Ruth Bradley as Frances O'Flaherty, high-ranking soldier in the Irish rebellion.
- Sarah Greene as May Lacy, secretary and mistress of Charles Hammond.
- Michelle Fairley as Dolly Butler
- Ian McElhinney as Edward Butler, Elizabeth's father.
- Michael Ford-FitzGerald as Harry Butler, Elisabeth's cynical and apolitical brother.
- Paul Reid as Stephen Duffy Lyons, fiance of Elizabeth.
- Barry Ward as Arthur Mahon, soldier loyal to the British forces; older brother to Jimmy.
- Lydia McGuinness as Peggy Mahon, Arthur's wife
- Jordanne Jones as Minnie Mahon, briefly a servant for the Butler household.
- Jason Cullen as Peter Mahon, a young boy who gets wrapped up in the rebellion; son of Arthur, nephew of Jimmy.
- Jaeylynne Wallace Ruane as Sadie Mahon
- Millie Donnelly as Gracie Mahon, a baby.
- Tom Turner as Charles Hammond, an Englishman "Assistant under secretary"; husband of Vanessa and lover of May.
- Laurence O'Fuarain as Desmond Byrne
- Perdita Weeks as Vanessa Hammond, wife of Charles.
- Andrew Simpson as George Wilson, an Englishman and fiance of Ingrid; later, a prosecutor on behalf of the British against Irish PoWs.
- Sophie Robinson as Ingrid Webster, fiancee of George and nurse for the Irish rebellion.
- Barry Keoghan as Cormac McDevitt, young soldier for the Irish rebellion.
- Brian McCardie as James Connolly
- Marcus Lamb as Patrick Pearse
- Sebastian Thommen as Michael Collins
- Lalor Roddy as Thomas Clarke
- Sean Fox as Sean McDermott
- Jack Shepherd as William Lowe
- Michael Feast as Sir Matthew Nathan
- Camille O'Sullivan as Constance Markievicz

== Episode list ==
No.	Title	Original release date
1	"Young Guns"	3 January 2016
As Irish nationalists plot to overthrow British rule, friends May, Frances and Elizabeth follow separate paths in order to do their bit.
2	"To Arms"	10 January 2016
On Easter Monday a few hundred rebels launch their attack taking the authorities and holidaying Dubliners by surprise. Lover is pitted against lover, friend against friend and brother against brother as the rebellion takes hold.
3	"Under Siege"	17 January 2016
Three days into a siege the rebels seek international recognition for Irish independence but the British forces are closing in. Elizabeth, Frances and Jimmy are caught up in the action at the GPO. Meanwhile, tragedy strikes the Mahon family as their young son Peter is shot and killed.
4	"Surrender"	24 January 2016
In the face of overwhelming British reinforcements, the rebels surrender. Swift military courts martial and executions follow.
5	"The Reckoning"	31 January 2016
As the dust settles from the rebellion, May, Elizabeth and Frances deal with the consequences of their actions.

== Background ==
The series was directed by Finnish director Aku Louhimies and written by series creator Colin Teevan.

RTÉ secured €400,000 in funding from the Broadcasting Authority of Ireland in 2014. In May 2015, RTÉ confirmed it would produce a drama series commemorating the 100th Anniversary of the 1916 Rising; the show was filmed during summer 2015 in Dublin. In December 2015, RTÉ Television confirmed the series would premiere in early January on Irish television. The series, which cost €6 million, is the most expensive drama series produced by the public broadcaster. RTÉ and Zodiac Media, the production company that made Rebellion, announced in 2016 they would produce a sequel series, initially titled Rebellion: Two States, set during the War of Independence. The sequel, starring Brian Gleeson and Gavin Drea, was released in 2019 with the title Resistance. The sequel opens as British police are closing in on Irish leader Michael Collins and his men.

== International broadcast ==
The series premiered on SundanceTV in the United States, on 24 April 2016 and on YLE in Finland, on 1 June 2016. SundanceTV has combined episodes into pairs and titled "To Arms", "Under Siege" and "The Reckoning" S1E5. The series is available on RTÉ Player in Ireland and on Netflix worldwide, except in Finland.

== Reception ==
Following its first broadcast, episode 1 held a strong audience of 619,000. Forty-one percent of the available audience tuned in to RTÉ One to watch the opening episode of the five-part series, with an additional 45,000 people catching it on RTÉ One +1 and more than 9,000 people viewing it on the RTÉ Player.

The Irish Times gave the first episode a favourable review. After the series had aired, the review in The Irish Times was less favourable: "Now, though, as we learn more about the events of Easter 1916 – largely through the centenary coverage in print and on television – we know its history is filled with real drama, extraordinary events and fascinating characters (some of them women). This dramatic device of creating fictitious ones now looks like a wasted opportunity."

The Irish Mirror claimed that the series was "destined to court controversy". Dr. Shane Kenna, a historian and lecturer at Trinity College Dublin, criticised the series for its "poor ahistorical script with no educational benefit". The series was slated on social media, with many viewers criticising its historical inaccuracies.

Among the ahistorical elements of the series complained of by critics were scenes in which rebels shot looting civilians, the depiction of Dublin's slums as somewhat comfortable and the portrayal of Sean Connolly executing an unarmed constable who offered only token resistance at the gates of Dublin Castle. While Constable James O'Brien was the first fatality of the Rising, he was described as rushing to lock the gates and then grabbing for a rebel's gun or, according to Helena Molony, as physically attempting to stop Connolly from advancing toward the gate before Connolly shot him. Critics also took issue with the show's misrepresentation of the roles and ideologies of other real-life historical figures. Gerry Adams tweeted that "whoever wrote Rebellion [should've] read Pearse's writings." Rónán Duffy wrote in TheJournal.ie that a scene showing Éamon de Valera losing his nerve while awaiting execution before a firing squad only to be spared at the last moment was probably the show's "most unnecessary" use of poetic license.

Pat Stacey, writing in the Irish Independent, wrote negatively about the dialogue, stating: "the characters didn’t so much converse as chuck out egregiously stilted slabs of text which hung in the air for a moment, before crashing to the floor", concluding: "It’s not historical accuracy the Rebellion has to worry about; it's plain, old-fashioned bad writing, allied with dismally flat direction." In TheJournal.ie, Duffy complained that too many of the subplots and characters were extraneous and often did not have satisfying or, in some cases, clear conclusions.
