= Charlotte Bradley =

Irish stage and film actress

- Born: Artane, Ireland
- Education: University College Dublin
- Occupation: Actress
- Years active: 1994–present

Charlotte Bradley is an Irish stage and film actress.

Born in Artane, Dublin, Bradley studied at University College Dublin and began her acting career on stage before moving to Newfoundland with her husband and young daughter, actress Ruth Bradley. While spending the 1980s in Canada, Bradley became a singer. Bradley returned to Ireland in the 1990s, where she started acting in films and on television.

Bradley won the 2005 Irish Film & Television Award (IFTA) for Best Supporting Actress in a Film, for her performance in The Boys from County Clare (2003). Bradley was nominated in 2015 for the IFTA Best Actress in a Supporting Role in Drama, for her performance in The Gift (2014).

== Selected filmography ==
- Father Ted (1996; TV series)
- Fair City (1996; TV series)
- Smilla's Sense of Snow (1997)
- Mystic Knights of Tir Na Nog (1998; TV series)
- About Adam (2000)
- Cáca Milis (2001; Short film)
- The Boys from County Clare (2003)
- Veronica Guerin (2003)
- Proof (2004–2005; TV series)
- Seacht (2008; TV series)
- Titanic: Blood and Steel (2012; Mini-series)
- The Gift (2014)
- Nails (2017)
- Bent (2018)
- Endeavour (2019)
- The Dry (2022)
