= Zeresenay Berhane Mehari =

Ethiopian filmmaker (born 1974)

- Born: Zeresenay Berhane Mehari; 1974 (age 51–52); Addis Ababa, Ethiopian Empire
- Education: University of Southern California School of Cinematic Arts
- Occupations: Director, producer, screenwriter
- Years active: 2000–present
- Notable work: Sweetness in the Belly

Zeresenay Berhane Mehari (born 1974) is an Ethiopian filmmaker. He is notable as the director of critically acclaimed films Difret and Sweetness in the Belly.

Apart from cinema, he is the co-founder and Head of Original Content for Kana Television, the number-one rated free-to-air, private satellite entertainment TV channel in Ethiopia.

== Personal life ==
He was born in Addis Ababa, Ethiopia in a family with seven siblings. He later moved to USA whereas his brother and sister moved to The Netherlands, and another brother is in Sweden.

== Career ==
After moving to USA, Mehari studied film at the University of Southern California School of Cinematic Arts and graduated with a Bachelor of Arts degree. While studying, he founded the production company 'Haile–Addis Pictures'.

He started to work as a production assistant for two episodes: All About Eve and The Seven Year Itch in 2000 television serial Backstory. Then he was the production assistant for episode M*A*S*H: Comedy Under Fire in 2001 serial History vs. Hollywood. Later in 2006, he was the producer of shortLeila directed by Hanelle M. Culpepper. Later in the year, he made his first short film Coda.

In 2005 he was introduced to the attorney Meaza Ashenafi by her brother. Then along with him, they discovered the case of Hirut Assefa and the tradition of “telefa” while doing research on Meaza and working in her organization. By using the incident, he directed maiden feature film Difret in 2014, which gained positive critical reviews. The executive producer of the film was popular Hollywood actress Angelina Jolie. Even though he had the opportunity to shoot the film in 2009, he later wait until 2012 for filming due to casting problems. The film had its premier at Sundance Film Festival in January 2013. The film won audience awards at Sundance Film Festival, Berlin Film Festival, Park City Film Music Festival, Amsterdam Film Festival as well as in Montreal World Film Festival. However, in September 2014, the official premiere of the film was blocked in Ethiopia by the authorities citing the film allegedly giving 'too much credit' to Meaza. However, it was later released with two lawsuits and had a successful theatrical run in Ethiopia.

In 2019, he made second feature, Sweetness in the Belly, a sophomore film starring Dakota Fanning and Yahya Abdul-Mateen II. It had its premier in the Discovery section of the Toronto Film Festival. The film was an adaptation of the book of the same name written by Camilla Gibb.

== Filmography ==
Year	Film	Role	Genre	Ref.
2000	Backstory	production assistant	TV series documentary	
2001	History vs. Hollywood	production assistant	TV series documentary	
2006	Leila	producer	Short film	
2006	Coda	Director, producer	Short film	
2008	Africa Unite: A Celebration of Bob Marley's 60th Birthday	co-line producer	Documentary	
2014	Difret	Director	Film	
2019	Inheritance (Wurse)	Director	TV series	
2019	Sweetness in the Belly	Director	Film	
