= Camilla Gibb =

British-Canadian writer

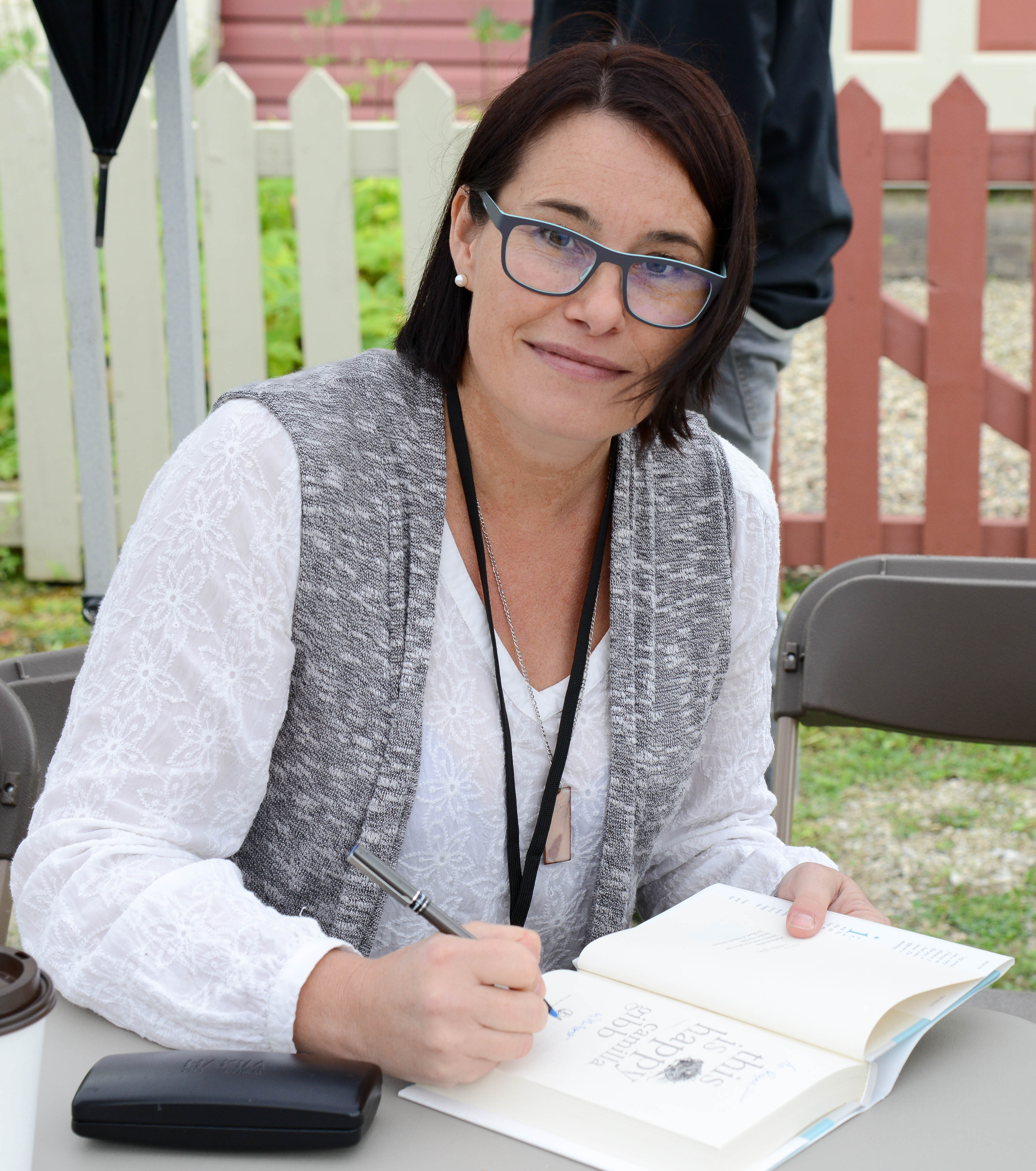
- Gibb at the Eden Mills Writers' Festival in 2015
- Born: February 20, 1968 (age 58); London, England
- Education: American University in Cairo; University of Toronto; Oxford University
- Occupation: Novelist
- Children: 1
- Relatives: Sheila Fennessy (mother), Duncan Gibb (father)
- Writing career
- Notable awards: 2001 City of Toronto Book Award, 2006 Trillium Book Award

Camilla Gibb (born February 20, 1968) is an English-born Canadian writer who currently resides in Toronto.

== Early life and education ==
Born in London, England, she grew up in Toronto, Ontario, and studied at North Toronto Collegiate Institute and Jarvis Collegiate Institute. She attended the American University in Cairo before receiving a Bachelor of Arts degree in anthropology and Middle Eastern studies from the University of Toronto and a Doctor of Philosophy in social anthropology from the University of Oxford. She left academia in 2000 in order to pursue writing full-time.

== Career ==
Gibb gained recognition as a writer with the publication of her first novel, Mouthing the Words, in 1999. She wrote it while living in her brother's trailer home, working on a borrowed laptop, after receiving a $6,000 gift from a benefactor. In 2000, the novel won Gibb the City of Toronto Book Award, and in 2001, she won the CBC Canadian Literary Award for short fiction.

Gibb's second novel, The Petty Details of So-and-So's Life, was published in August 2002.

Gibb's third novel, Sweetness in the Belly (2005), is set against the backdrop of the Ethiopian Revolution and largely takes place in the ancient walled city of Harar. It was shortlisted for the Scotiabank Giller Prize in 2005, longlisted for the Dublin IMPAC Award and won the Trillium Award for best book in Ontario in 2006. It has been produced as film starring Dakota Fanning, Yahya Abdul-Mateen II and Kunal Nayyar.

Her fourth novel, The Beauty of Humanity Movement was published in Canada in September 2010, and in the US and the UK in spring 2011.

Gibb's memoir, This is Happy, was released in Canada on August 18, 2015.

== Personal life ==
Gibb's father Duncan, a man she describes as "prone to manic outbursts and destructive, paranoid and cruel", but also intelligent and full of projects, disappeared when she was in her early twenties. She had very few contacts with him until his death.

In 2009, Gibb separated from her partner, Heather Conway, after almost ten years together. Gibb was pregnant at the time; she later gave birth to a daughter. Her 2015 book This is Happy is a memoir that explores what the word "family" means to her, from the family she grew up in to the one she had to build with her child.

== Selected works ==
- Mouthing the Words (Pedlar Press (Canada), Carrol and Graf (US), William Heinemann/Vintage (UK), 1999)
- The Petty Details of So-and-So's Life (Doubleday Canada, 2002, Vintage UK)
- Sweetness in the Belly (Doubleday Canada, 2005, William Heinemann/Vintage UK, Penguin Press US)
- The Beauty of Humanity Movement (Doubleday Canada, 2010, Atlantic Books UK, Penguin Press US)
- This is Happy (Doubleday Canada, 2015)
- The Relatives (Anchor Canada, 2021)
- I Used To Be a Pisces (Book*hug, 2026)
