= Spacers (play) =

1986 play by Paul Mercier

Spacers is a 1986 play by Irish playwright Paul Mercier.

== Synopsis ==
The play follows a group of young supermarket employees as they rehearse a play written by the store's security guard for a local competition. The play they are rehearsing is titled Mikado - The Sequel. The play is an imitation of the Gilbert and Sullivan opera The Mikado and martial arts films. The play has been written by the supermarket's security guard.

== Production history ==
The play was first produced by Passion Machine in the SFX City Theatre in November 1986. The production was directed by Paul Mercier.
