= Paul Mercier (playwright) =

Irish playwright screenwriter, film and theatre director

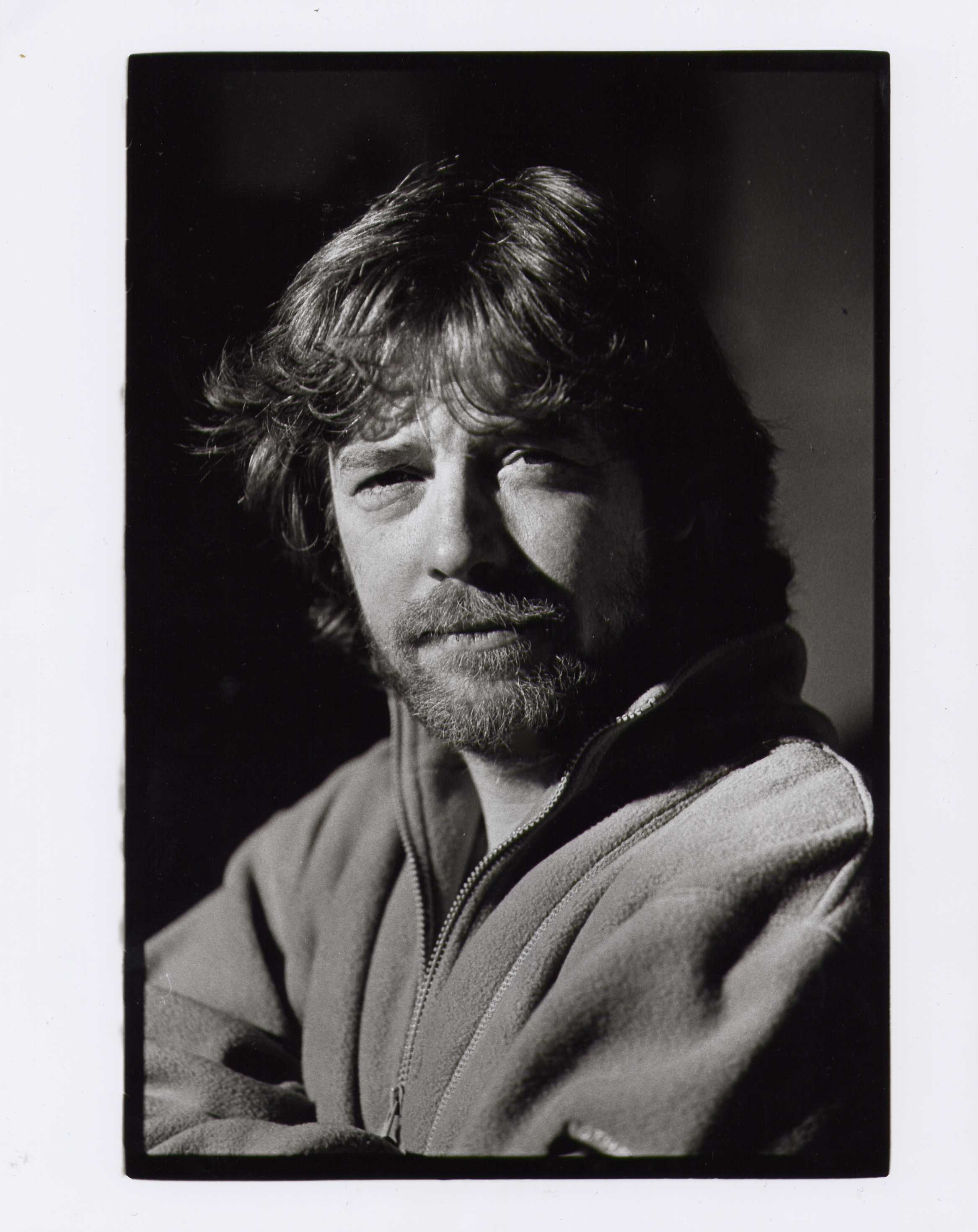

Paul Mercier (born 1958 in Dublin) is an Irish playwright screenwriter, film and theatre director. Born in Dublin and living in An Cheathrú Rua he was the founder member and Artistic Director of the Passion Machine Theatre Company, and is a Director with Anne Gately of the film production company An Pointe Productions. His work is known for its gritty poetic realism and examination of ordinary, contemporary Irish life.

== Career ==
Paul Mercier's work is known for what Irish journalist Fintan O'Toole calls its "inclusive dramatic vision". His plays have received numerous awards such as the Harvey's Irish Theatre Award for Best New Irish Work, The Sunday Independent Arts Award, The Sunday Tribune Arts Award, The Rooney Prize for Irish Literature, and an Edinburgh Fringe First Award. His 1998 Dublin Trilogy received the Evening Herald/ Dublin Theatre Festival Award for Best Irish Production and The Irish Times/ ESB Irish Theatre Award for Best Production. He has written and directed two award-winning short films for Brother Films, 'Before I Sleep' and 'Lipservice', inspired by his time as an Irish teacher at Greendale Community School in Kilbarrack. He directed and co-created the hit Irish-language teenage series 'Aifric' for TG4. He wrote and directed 'Sétanta', a co-production by the Abbey Theatre and Fibín Theatre Company which received the BBC Irish language award at the 2012 Stewart Parker Trust Awards.

== Playography ==
Paul Mercier has written and directed the following plays for the Passion Machine Theatre Company, founded in 1984. The company is a project-based operation, staging only original Irish work, and committed to a wholly indigenous theatre that depicted, challenged and celebrated the contemporary Irish experience.

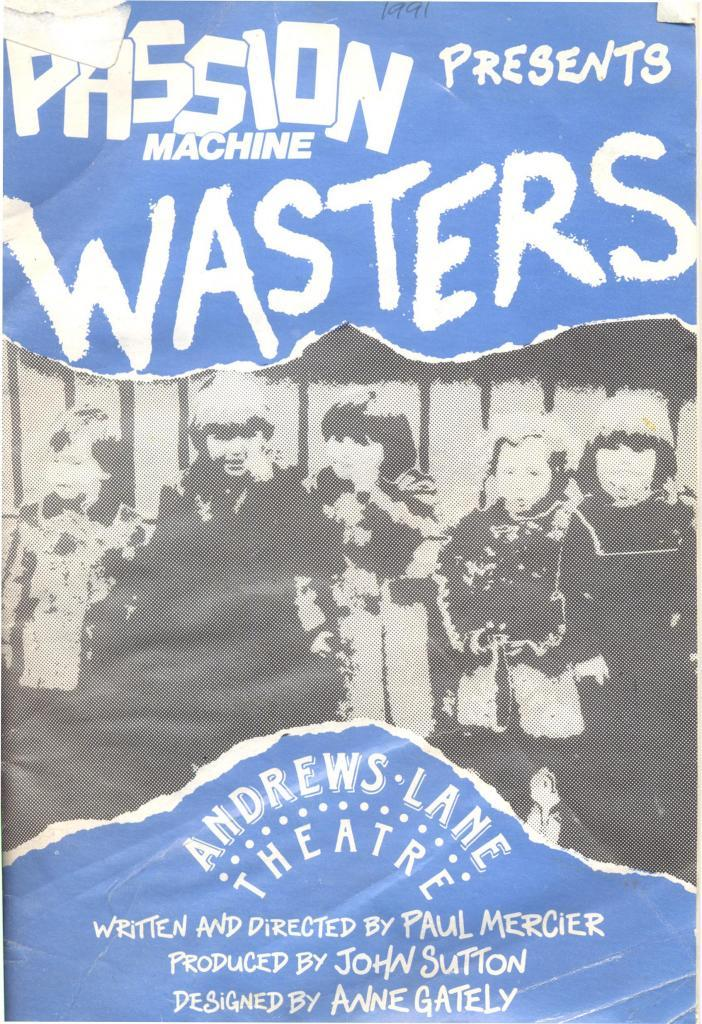
Wasters, 1985

- Drowning (1984),
- Wasters (1985),
- Studs (1986),
- Spacers (1986),
- Home (1988),
- Pilgrims (1993),
- Buddleia (1995),
- Kitchensink (1996),
- Native City (1998),
- We Ourselves (2000),
- Diarmuid and Gráinne (2001),
- P (2006).

His work for The Abbey Theatre includes:

- Down the Line (2000) [Directed by Lynn Parker],
- Homeland (2006) [Writer/Director],
- The Passing (2011) [Writer/Director],
- The East Pier (2011) [Writer/Director].

He has written and directed two plays in the Irish language for the Irish language theatre company Fíbín

- Sétanta (2011),
- Réiltín (2013).

== Filmography ==
Paul Mercier has written and directed three award-winning short films:

- Before I Sleep (1996),
- Lipservice (1998),
- Tubberware (2001)

He directed and adapted for the screen his play Studs for Fiach Mac Conghail and Cuan Mac Conghail's Brother Films

- Studs (2006),

For his own film production company An Pointe Productions:

- Pursuit (2015),
- We Ourselves (2018)

He was the director and co-creator of the celebrated TG4 TV series, Aifric (2006, 2007, 2008). Aifric won best Children's/Youth programme at the 2007, 2008, 2009 Irish Film and Television Awards, and was nominated for Best Irish Language show in 2009.
