= Sweetness in the Belly =

- Film poster
- Directed by: Zeresenay Berhane Mehari
- Written by: Laura Phillips
- Based on: Sweetness in the Belly by Camilla Gibb
- Produced by: Jennifer Kawaja; Alan Moloney; Susan Mullen; Julia Sereny
- Starring: Dakota Fanning; Wunmi Mosaku; Kunal Nayyar; Yahya Abdul-Mateen II
- Cinematography: Tim Fleming
- Edited by: Susan Maggi
- Music by: Todor Kobakov
- Production companies: Parallel Films; Sienna Films
- Distributed by: Entertainment One
- Release date: September 7, 2019 (TIFF)
- Running time: 110 minutes
- Countries: Ireland; Canada; United Kingdom
- Language: English

Sweetness in the Belly is a 2019 drama film directed by Zeresenay Berhane Mehari, based on the novel of the same name by Camilla Gibb.

It had its world premiere at the 2019 Toronto International Film Festival.

== Plot ==
In the 1960s, Lilly, a British girl, is raised as a Muslim at a Sufi shrine in Morocco after being abandoned there by her parents. As a young woman in the early 1970s, she is sent to Harar, Ethiopia, where she falls in love with a doctor named Aziz, but they are separated when the Ethiopian Civil War begins.

Lilly escapes as a refugee to England. There she befriends Amina, a traumatized fellow refugee who moves in with her. Lilly works as a nurse's aide at a hospital, where a kind doctor named Robin befriends her, but she resists his romantic interest as she hopes to be reunited with Aziz. She and Amina found an association to aid fellow refugees in reunifying their scattered families.

Amina and her two children are reunited with her husband, who has been in an Ethiopian prison, and they move to Canada, but Lilly is shattered to learn that Aziz was executed. Robin helps her recover and she shares her story with him, telling him that she had been told her parents died of drugs.

== Cast ==
- Dakota Fanning as Lilly Abdal
- Wunmi Mosaku as Amina
- Kunal Nayyar as Dr. Robin Sathi
- Yahya Abdul-Mateen II as Dr. Aziz Abdul Nasser
- Estad Tewfik Yusuf Mohamed as The Great Abdel
- Edelework Tassew as Gishta
- Zeritu Kebede as Nouria
- Yafet Henock as Mersha
- Rafael Goncalves as Ahmed
- Molly McCann as Lilly Mitchell 7 yrs
- Gavin Drea as Phillip

== Production ==
In January 2017, it was announced Saoirse Ronan had joined the cast of the film, with Zeresenay Berhane Mehari directing from a screenplay by Laura Phillips, based upon the novel of the same name by Camilla Gibb. In November 2018, it was announced Dakota Fanning, Yahya Abdul-Mateen II, Wunmi Mosaku and Kunal Nayyar joined the cast of the film, with Fanning replacing Ronan.

Principal photography began in November 2018, in Dublin. Production on the film also took place in Harar.

== Release ==
The film had its world premiere at the Toronto International Film Festival on September 7, 2019. In April 2020, Gravitas Ventures acquired U.S. distribution rights to the film, and set it for a May 8, 2020, release. Entertainment One will distribute in Canada.

== Reception ==
Sweetness in the Belly holds a 40% approval rating on review aggregator website Rotten Tomatoes, based on 10 reviews, with an average of 6.6/10.

The film received backlash for Dakota Fanning portraying the lead role in the film. Amid whitewashing allegations, Fanning took to social media to share more details about her character. "Just to clarify. In the new film I'm part of, Sweetness in the Belly, I do not play an Ethiopian woman", the actress wrote in a message on her Instagram Story. "I play a British woman abandoned by her parents at seven years old in Africa and raised Muslim."
