= The Boys from County Clare =

The Boys And Girl from County Clare
- Film poster
- Directed by: John Irvin
- Written by: Nicholas Adams
- Produced by: Wolfgang Esenwein; Evzen Kolar; Ellen Dinerman Little; Bill Kenwright
- Starring: Bernard Hill; Charlotte Bradley; Andrea Corr; Colm Meaney; Stephen Brennan; Eamonn Owens; Shaun Evans; Ian Shaw; Brendan O'Hare
- Cinematography: Thomas Burstyn
- Edited by: Ian Crafford
- Music by: Fiachra Trench, Ciuán Cardàdd
- Distributed by: Samuel Goldwyn Films; Studio Hamburg WorldWide Pictures
- Release date: September 12, 2003 (Canada)
- Running time: 90 minutes
- Countries: Ireland; United Kingdom; Germany
- Language: English
- Budget: $8 million
- Box office: $132,000 (U.S. theatrical release)

The Boys from County Clare is a 2003 Irish comedy/drama film about a céilí band from Liverpool that travels to Ireland to compete in a céilí competition in County Clare. Directed by John Irvin, the film was released in Canada on September 12, 2003, and in the U.S., on a limited release, on March 13, 2005. The film was entitled The Boys and Girl from County Clare for the U.S. release and The Great Ceili War for the U.K. release.

== Plot ==
Set in 1965, Jimmy McMahon (Colm Meaney) is an Irishman living in Liverpool who directs a céilí band of young men who go to a competition of traditional Celtic music in Ireland in County Clare. A native Irish band directed by John Joe McMahon (Bernard Hill) is also present to compete as well, with animosity between Jimmy and John, as they are brothers. The two brothers could not be more different, as they have taken different paths. There are multiple surprises for them as the competition takes place, with a familial twist at the very end.

We start on a flashback of a kid’s past performing as a musician. We then flash forward 40 years to Liverpool where we see Jimmy arrive at the Shamrock performance center. He coaches his musicians on how to best play their songs in the irish manner. We then cut to John Joe performing in a pub in a different lifestyle. We then see Jimmy and his band on the way to a competition and go on the road. John Joe will also compete in the competition and Jimmy has paid to sabotage John Joe to get there late. John Joe and Jimmy are drifting to register in the competition. Both have trouble getting to registration but eventually both arrive at the festival. They both register as it's revealed they are old friends that went on different paths of life. They have a deep competitive and antagonistic spirit. Since John Joe got a ride, Jimmy fires his saboteurs as they failed at their job. Teddy and Alex hang out in the pub and meet a girl.

The competition starts with kids participating first. Teddy takes a liking to the girl and makes more conversation with her. John Joe’s band starts to do their performance. One of John Joe’s associates steals Jimmy’s instrument. Jimmy steals another violin from a kid and begins their performance. John Joe brings it back during the performance to make up for this major mistake. It is revealed Jimmy is the father of Ann and his former lover is not happy on how he treated her. Ann is upset and wants a drink and goes with Teddy. We also learn John and Jimmy are also brothers. They begin a chat in the pub. Ann gets drunk and they go back to her place. Her mom is not happy she’s hanging with Teddy. Her mom reveals she did not marry her father as he was already married so she decided to not tell Ann about him at all due to that. John, Jimmy and Ann’s mother talk in the pub. They wrestle with the past and with Ann seeing Teddy. Later that night everyone gathers as they announce the winner. The winner is Father and his South African band. So it was a surprise to John and Jimmy. Teddy makes Ann a proposal for her to come with the band to Liverpool. Ann wants to but her mom does not recommend it. Ann’s mother eventually accepted it and realized she was wrong to oppose her leaving. Both musicians return to their normal lives and life goes on.

== Cast ==
- Bernard Hill as John Joe McMahon
- Andrea Corr as Anne
- Charlotte Bradley as Maisie
- Stephen Brennan as Miko
- Colm Meaney as Jimmy McMahon
- Eamonn Owens as Pat
- Shaun Evans as Teddy
- Ian Shaw as Johnny
- Brendan O'Hare as Brendan
- Malachy Bourke as Ben
- Leslie Bingham as Leslie
- Phillip Barantini as Alex
- Frank Twomey as Roger
- Emmet Kirwan as Clive
- Patrick Bergin as Padjo

== Awards ==
- Winner - Best Supporting Actress, Charlotte Bradley - Irish Film and Television Awards
- Nominated - Best Music, Fiachra Trench - Irish Film and Television Awards
- Winner - Best Actress, Andrea Corr - U.S. Comedy Arts Festival

== Reception ==
The film received mixed reviews from critics. The review aggregation website Rotten Tomatoes gives the film a score of 48% with an average score of 6.10/10 based on reviews from 27 critics. The website's consensus reads, "The Boys and Girl from County Clare is a charming - if entirely predictable - story about sibling rivalry featuring lively traditional Irish music."
