= Mahder Assefa =

Ethiopian actress

- ማህደር አሰፋ
- Born: 5 October 1987 (age 38); Addis Ababa, Ethiopia
- Education: Admas University College–Addis Ababa
- Occupation: Actress
- Years active: 2008–present
- Spouse: Mohammed Hussein Al Amoudi
- Children: 1
- Parent(s): Assefa Demelash; Rebeka Feyessa
- Awards: Best Actress of The Year, 2013
- Website: Archived website

Mahder Assefa (born 5 October 1987) is an Ethiopian actress. She has performed leading roles in Seberta, Yalteneka Amalayu, Ye Bet Lij, Shefu, FBI 2, Made In China and the Triangle trilogy. Mahder also garnered a public attention in 2011 late night television drama series Sew le sew, starring as Medhanit.

== Early life and education ==
Mahder was born on 5 October 1987 in Addis Ababa, Ethiopia around Shero Meda to Rebeka Feyessa and Assefa Demelash. She lived there until she was 5, at which point she moved to the neighbouring district of Kera. She attended elementary school at Atse Zeray Yacob and then subsequently attended secondary school at Shemeles Habte School, graduating in 2011. She completed her college education at Admas College, studying Secretarial Science. While attending college, she worked as a salesperson. Mahder showed an interest in dancing from a young age. Despite her parents' desire for her to focus on her education, she continued dancing until high school and formed a dance group with her friends, entitled "UNIQUE GIRLS". The group was successful and led to Mahder and her co-performers being invited to be background dancers with a range of Ethiopian musicians, including Dawit Melesse and Tibebu Workiye. Coverage on television led to her mother discovering her dancing hobby, and the group disbanded to allow Mahder to focus on education.

== Career ==
Upon leaving college, she gained employment with Bole International Airport, working in a duty-free shop as a salesperson for around four years. During this time, she started her work in the film industry and applied for a role in Tasralech. Despite her reservations about her lack of acting experience, she gained the part. She was subsequently persuaded by a friend to join a production company. Following her first film, Mahder starred in several others such as Seberta, Yalteneka, Amalayu, Ye Bet Lij, Shefu, FBI 2, Made In China, Triangle, Amran, 45 Ken, Linega Sil, Tsinu Kal, Body Guard, Hiwot ena Sak, Ayrak, Anelakekem. In 2011, Mahder also starred in the popular television drama series Sew le sew, rolling as Medi. Her appearance in the show raised her profile, and soon she also had work in billboards, magazines and TV commercials. In connection with her filmography, she has been interviewed on several television shows, including ETV Lewtatoch and Enechewawet on EBS TV.

== Personal life ==
Mahder is married to Saudi-born businessman Sheikh Mohammad Hussein Al Amoudi as Newspaper tabloids reported.

== Awards and nominations ==
In 2012, Amran was selected as best film of year in Sheger 102.1 Leza Radio Show. Mahder Assefa is selected as a Winner Best Actress of The Year 2013. The selection is based on audience choices and her renowned film.

In 2012, one of Mahder's works, Amran, was selected as film of the year by FM 102.1. In 2013, she was selected as Best Actress of The Year.
