= List of African film festivals =

This page lists film festivals in Africa in addition to film festivals devoted to African film held outside the continent.

The largest film festival in Africa is the biennial Pan-African Film and Television Festival of Ouagadougou (FESPACO) held in Burkina Faso.

In the tables below, "mixed" in the Details column, indicates that the festival screens films of different formats and genres (feature and short films, fiction and documentaries).

== Algeria ==
Name	Original / international name	City	Created	Details	Official site	Month
Festival international du cinéma d’Alger (FICA)	Algiers Film Festival	Algiers	2011	Mixed. International	(en) Official site	11
Journées du court-métrage à Annaba	Journées du court-métrage à Annaba	Annaba	2007	Short films	Official site	12
Festival du film méditerranéen d'Annaba	Festival du film méditerranéen d'Annaba	Annaba	1986	Mediterranean Cinema. Back in 2023 after four years of hiatus	(en) Official site	04
Imedghassen Film Festival	Festival international du film Imedghassen	Batna	2019	Mixed. International	(en) Official site	05
Rencontres Cinématographiques de Bejaia	Rencontres Cinématographiques de Bejaia	Bejaia	2005	Mixed. International, auteur cinema	(en) Official site	09
Oran International Arabic Film Festival	(fr) Festival d’Oran du Film arabe	Oran	1976	Arab cinema. Resumes in 2024 after stopping since 2018.	Official site	10
International Documentary Film Festival, RIFDOC, Sidi M'hamed Benaouda	(Fr) Festival international du film documentaire Sidi M'hamed Benaouda	Relizane	2019	Feature and short documentaries	Official site	11
Sahara International Film Festival (FiSahara)	Festival Internacional de Cine del Sáhara Occidental	Sahara	2003	The only festival in the world to take place in a refugee camp (the Sahrawi camp) in South-West Algeria (Sahrawi Arab Democratic Republic) – Main prize: White Camel	(en) Official site	04-05
National Cultural Festival for Women's Literature and Cinema	Festival national de la littérature et du cinéma féminins de Saïda	Saïda	2017	Women's films	Official site	05
Sétif International Short Film Days	Journée Cinématographique Internationale de Sétif	Sétif	2020	Short films, main prize: l’Épis d’or	Official site	

== Angola ==
Name	Original / international name	City	Created	Details	Official site	Month
Kianda International Short Film Festival (FESC-KIANDA)	Kianda International Short Film Festival (FESC-KIANDA)	Kianda	2019	Short films	(pt) Official site	01
Viana Cinefest	Viana Cinefest	Viana	2020	Open-air cinema	(pt) Official site	07
Luanda International Pan-African Film Festival (LUANDA PAFF)	Luanda International Pan-African Film Festival (LUANDA PAFF)	Luanda	2019	Mixed. African and diaspora films	(pt) Official site [archive]	11
Angola International Film Festival	Angola International Film Festival	Luanda	2023	Mixed. Angolan and international films	(pt) Official site	

== Benin ==
Name	Original / international name	City	Created	Details	Official site	Month
Lagunimages	Lagunimages	Cotonou	2000	Mixed. Biennial	Official site	
Ouidah International Film Festival	Festival international du film de Ouidah	Ouidah	2003	Mixed. International Festival	Official site	
Festival international des films de femmes de Cotonou (FIFFC)	Festival international des films de femmes de Cotonou (FIFFC)	Cotonou	2019	Promotes African women filmmakers	Official site	02
Festival International du Court-Métrage des Écoles de Cinéma	Festival International du Court-Métrage des Écoles de Cinéma	Cotonou	2017	Isma-Benin Festival	Official site	
Rencontres de Belles Images Africaines de Parakou	Rencontres de Belles Images Africaines de Parakou	Parakou	2012	Mixed. African films	Official site	
Ciné 229 Awards	Ciné 229 Awards	Cotonou	2017	Mixed. Beninese films	Official site	12
Festival International du Cinéma Numérique de Cotonou (FICNC)	Festival International du Cinéma Numérique de Cotonou (FICNC)	Cotonou	2010	Biennial. Mixed. Digital films	Official site	12
Rencontres cinématographiques et numériques de Cotonou (ReCiCo)	Rencontres cinématographiques et numériques de Cotonou (ReCiCo)	Cotonou	2011	Mixed. African films	Official site	10
Festival international du film documentaire de Porto- Novo (FIFDOPO)	Festival international du film documentaire de Porto- Novo (FIFDOPO)	Porto-Novo	2022	Documentaries	Official site	07-08

== Botswana ==
Name	Original / international name	City	Created	Details	Official site	Month
Botswana Film Festival	Botswana Film Festival	Gaborone			(en) Official site	
Dissident Film Festival	Dissident Film Festival	Maun	2016	International short films	(en) Official site	
Bantu Film Festival	Bantu Film Festival	Gaborone	2022	Botswana School Films and Southern African Films	(en) Official site	10

== Burkina Faso ==
Name	Original / international name	City	Created	Details	Official site	Month
Panafrican Film and Television Festival of Ouagadougou	Festival panafricain du cinéma et de la télévision de Ouagadougou FESPACO	Ouagadougou	1969	Mixed. The most important film festival in sub-Saharan Africa – Main prize: Étalon de Yennenga	Official site	02-03
Festival Ciné-Droit-Libre	Festival Ciné-Droit-Libre	Ouagadougou	2004	Mixed. Films committed to human rights and freedom of expression	Official site	12
Festival des Identités Culturelles (FESTIC)	Festival des Identités Culturelles (FESTIC)	Ouagadougou	2018	Mixed. Promotion of films that introduce cultural expressions	Official site	05
Koudougou Doc	Koudougou Doc	Koudougou	2019	Documentaries by authors from Burkina, the continent and the world	Official site	04
Journées Cinématographiques de la Femme Africaine de l’image (JCFA)	Journées Cinématographiques de la Femme Africaine de l’image (JCFA)	Ouagadougou	2010	Films by women, alternating with Fespaco	Official site	03
Festival International du court métrage de Ouagadougou	Festival International du court métrage de Ouagadougou	Ouagadougou	2022	Short films	Official site	11
Rencontres cinématographiques de Sya (RECIS)	Rencontres cinématographiques de Sya (RECIS)	Bobo-Dioulasso	2022	Mixed	Official site	12
Rencontres de Createds audiovisuelles (RCA)	Rencontres de Createds audiovisuelles (RCA)	Ziniaré	2023	Mixed. Workshops and screenings of Burkinabe films	Official site	03

== Burundi ==
Name	Original / international name	City	Created	Details	Official site	Month
Festival International du Cinéma et de l’Audiovisuel du Burundi (FESTICAB)	Festival International du Cinéma et de l’Audiovisuel du Burundi (FESTICAB)	Bujumbura	2009	Mixed	Official site	12
Impakt Film Festival (IFF)	Impakt Film Festival IFF	Bujumbura	2023	Mixed	Official site	09

== Cameroon ==
Name	Original / international name	City	Created	Details	Official site	Month
Bafoussam International Independent Film Festival (BIFF)	Festival International de Cinéma Indépendant de Bafoussam (FICIB)	Bafoussam	2009	Free screenings of Cameroonian and international films. (Has not taken place since 2021)	Official site	
ArtCity Short Film Festival	ArtCity Short Film Festival	Buea	2014	Short films. English-speaking Cameroon	Official site	
Festival Panafricain de Série de Douala	Festival Panafricain de Série de Douala	Douala	2022	African Series Festival	Official site	11
Rencontres Audiovisuelles de Douala RADO	Rencontres Audiovisuelles de Douala (RADO)	Douala	2010	Mixed. African films. Relaunch in 2024.		09
Festival éducatif Komane	Festival éducatif Komane	Dschang	2015	Mixed. Cameroonian and international films	Official site	02
Festival du Cinéma du Sahel	Festival du Cinéma du Sahel	Garoua	2015	Biennial	Official site	11
Festival international sahélien du film (FISFI)	Festival international sahélien du film (FISFI)	Maroua	2010	Sustaining the cultural and tourist potential of the northern part of Cameroon	Official site	
Melong movie show	Melong movie show	Melong	2017	Mixed. Tourist and cultural festival (Has not taken place since 2022.)	Official site	
Festival international du film mixte (FIFMI)	Festival international du film mixte (FIFMI)	Ngaoundéré	2009	Mixed. Cameroonian and international films, support for cultural diversity (Has not taken place since 2019).		
First Short- Festival panafricain de films école de Yaoundé	First Short- Festival panafricain de films école de Yaoundé	Yaoundé	2014	Cameroonian and international school films	Official site	04
Rencontres internationales de films courts de Yaoundé (RIFIC)	Rencontres internationales de films courts de Yaoundé RIFIC	Yaoundé	2004	Short films	Official site	
Festival international du film de quartier	Festival international du film de quartier (L’œil du kwatt)	Yaoundé	2016	In rural areas and working-class neighborhoods	Official site	
Festival international du film de l'Afrique Centrale	Festival international du film de l'Afrique Centrale	Yaoundé	2016	Short films	Official site	10
Festival international du film d’humour et des images comiques (FESTICO)	Festival international du film d’humour et des images comiques (FESTICO)	Yaoundé	2012	Comedy films. Organized during the International Week of Laughter and Happiness	Official site	
Journées du jeune cinéaste camerounais	Journées du jeune cinéaste camerounais	Yaoundé	2018	Mixed. Promotion of Cameroonian cinema	Official site	
African Cinema Animation Festival (CANIMAF)	African Cinema Animation (CANIMAF) Festival	Douala	2017	African animation films	Official site	10
Écrans noirs festival	Écrans noirs	Yaoundé	1997	Mixed. African films	Official site	10
Yarha (International First Film Festival)	Yarha Festival (Semaine Internationale du 1er Film)	Yaounde	2013		Official site	01
Festival international de Films de Femmes	Festival international de Films de Femmes	Yaoundé	2010	Women's Films (Has not taken place since 2018).	Official site	
Cameroun International Film Festival (CAMIFF)	Cameroun International Film Festival (CAMIFF)	Yaoundé	2016	Mixed. Cameroonian and international films. English-speaking Cameroon	Official site	10
Ciné-club N'kah	Ciné-club N'kah	Yaoundé	2011	Irregular event with personalities	Official site	05

== Cape Verde ==
Name	Original / international name	City	Created	Details	Official site	Month
Cabo Verde International Film Festival (CVIFF)	Cabo Verde International Film Festival (CVIFF)	Sal Island	2010	Short films	(en) Official site	
Praia International Film Festival	Praia International Film Festival	Praia	2013	National, regional and PALOP cinema	(pt) Official site	
Festival Oiá	Festival Oiá	Mindelo	2013	National, regional and PALOP cinema	(pt) Official site	04

== Central African Republic ==
Name	Original / international name	City	Created	Details	Official site	Month
Bangui Fait Son Cinéma (BFSC)	(fr) Bangui Fait Son Cinéma (BFSC)	Bangui	2020	International Festival of African and Afro-descendant Films	(en) Official site	11

== Chad ==
Name	Original / international name	City	Created	Details	Official site	Month
Festival Tchadien de Court-Métrage (FESTCOUM)	Festival Tchadien de Court-Métrage (FESTCOUM)	N’Djamena	2018	Chadian and African short films	(en) Official site	
Festival du cinéma et de l'audiovisuel Sao (FECAS)	Festival du cinéma et de l'audiovisuel Sao (FECAS)	N’Djamena	2018	African cinema and documentary	(en) Official site	05

== Comoros ==
Name	Original / international name	City	Created	Details	Official site	Month
Comoros International Film Festival (CIFF)	Comoros International Film Festival (CIFF)	Moroni	2012	Outdoor screenings	Official site	
Festival du cinéma comorien	Festival du cinéma comorien	Moroni	2023	Organized by the Union of Filmmakers of the Comoros UCC	Official site	

== Republic of the Congo ==
Name	Original / international name	City	Created	Details	Official site	Month
Festival international des courts métrages la Pointe-Noire (FICOMP)	(fr) Festival international des courts métrages la Pointe-Noire (FICOMP)	Pointe-Noire	2019	Short films	(en) Official site	
African Women Film Festival TAZAMA	(fr) Festival de Films de Femmes Africaines TAZAMA	Brazzaville	2014	African women's films	(en) Official site	
Pan-African Music Festival	Festival panafricain de musique (FESPAM)	Brazzaville	1996	Mixed	(en) Official site	

== Democratic Republic of the Congo ==
Name	Original / international name	City	Created	Details	Official site	Month
Bukavu Film Festival (FESTBUK)	Festival de Bukavu (Festbuk)	Bukavu	2005	Mixed	Official site	08
Congo International Film Festival (CIFF)	Congo International Film Festival (CIFF)	Goma	2005	Mixed	Official site	
Kinshasa International Film Festival	(fr) Festival International du Cinéma de Kinshasa (FICKIN)	Kinshasa	2014	Mixed. Congolese and international films	Official site	10
Women-Focused Film Festival (CINEF)	(fr) Festival du Cinéma au Féminin (CINEF)	Kinshasa	2014	Women's films	Official site	08
Kidogo Kidogo Festival	Festival Kidogo Kidogo	Lubumbashi	2014	Mixed. Congolese and African films	Official site	
Amani Festival	Festival Amani	Goma	2013	Mixed	Official site	

== Djibouti ==
Name	Original / international name	City	Created	Details	Official site	Month
Djibouti fait son cinéma	Djibouti fait son cinéma	Djibouti	2014	Francophone short films. Annual at the French Institute of Djibouti	Official site	

== Egypt ==
Name	Original / international name	City	Created	Details	Official site	Month
Alexandria Mediterranean Film Festival (AMFF)	Alexandria Mediterranean Film Festival (AMFF)	Alexandria	1994	Mediterranean Films	(ar) Official site	10
Alexandria short film festival	Alexandria short film festival	Alexandria	2013	International short films	(en) Official site	04
Aswan International Women's Film Festival	Aswan International Women's Film Festival	Aswan	2017	Mixed. International. Women's Cinema	(en) Official site	
Cairo International Film Festival (CIFF)	(fr) Festival international du film du Caire	Cairo	1920	Mixed. International	(en) Official site	11
Cairo Francophone Film Festival (CFFF)	Cairo Francophone Film Festival (CFFF)	Cairo	2020	Francophone cinema	(en) Official site	11
Cairo International Short Film Festival	Cairo International Short Film Festival	Cairo	2018	International short films	(en) Official site	12
Cairo Animation Forum	Cairo Animation Forum	Cairo	2010	Animation	(en) Official site	
Retro Avant Garde Film Festival	Retro Avant Garde Film Festival	Cairo	2020	Mixed. International	(en) Official site	09
Animatex	Animatex	Cairo	2019	Animation	(en) Official site	
Cairo Video Festival	Cairo Video Festival	Cairo	2010	Video art and experimental cinema	(en) Official site	
El Gouna Film Festival	Festival du film d'El Gouna	El Gouna	2017	Mixed. International	(en) Official site	10–11
Hurghada Youth Film Festival	Hurghada Youth Film Festival	Hurghada	2023	Egyptian films about youth	(en) Official site	09
Ismailia International Festival For Documentary and Short Films	Ismailia International Festival For Documentary & Short Films	Ismailia	1991	International documentaries and short films	(en) Official site	05
Luxor African Film Festival (LAFF)	(fr) Luxor African Film Festival (LAFF)	Louxor	2010	Mixed. African films	(en) Official site	02
Arabian Film Festival	(fr) Arabian Film Festival	Sharm El Sheikh	1923		(en) Official site	
Sharm El Sheikh Film Festival (SAFF)	Sharm El Sheikh Film Festival (SAFF)	Sharm El Sheikh	2019	Mixed. International	(en) Official site	

== Equatorial Guinea ==
Name	Original / international name	City	Created	Details	Official site	Month
Malabo International Music & Film Festival (EUFF)	Malabo International Music & Film Festival (EUFF)	Malabo	2022	Mixed	(en) Official site	04-05
Equatorial Guinea National Film Festival	(es) Festival Nacional de Cine de Guinea Ecuatorial (FENACI) (fr) Festival national du cinéma de Guinée équatoriale	Malabo	2022	Formerly the South-South Traveling Film Festival of Equatorial Guinea (FECIGE)	Official site	
NollywoodWeek Film Festival	(es) Festival de Cine NollywoodWeek	Bata, Djibloho	2023	Resumption of the Parisian NollywoodWeek festival	Official site	05

== Eritrea ==
Name	Original / international name	City	Created	Details	Official site	Month
Eurofilm Festival in Asmara	Eurofilm Festival in Asmara	Asmara	2004	Organised by the European Union delegation	Official site	

== Eswatini ==
Name	Original / international name	City	Created	Details	Official site	Month
European Film Festival in Eswatini	European Film Festival in Eswatini	Mbabane	2014	Extension of the European Film Festival South Africa to Eswatini	(en) Official site	
Eswatini International Film Festival	Eswatini International Film Festival	Mbabane	2023		(en) Official site	

== Ethiopia ==
Name	Original / international name	City	Created	Details	Official site	Month
Ethiopian International Film Festival (ETHIOIFF)	Ethiopian International Film Festival (ETHIOIFF)	Addis Ababa	2005	Mixed. More than 100 Ethiopian and African films	Official site	
Addis International Film Festival (AIFF)	Addis International Film Festival (AIFF)	Addis Ababa	2007	Documentaries and short films on social issues	Official site	05

== Gabon ==
Name	Original / international name	City	Created	Details	Official site	Month
Festival du Film de Masuku	(fr) Festival du Film de Masuku	Franceville	2013	Nature & environnement	Official site	12
Festival international des courts des écoles de cinéma (FICMEC)	(fr) Festival international des courts des écoles de cinéma (FICMEC)	Libreville	2011	School short films	Official site	05
Les Escales Documentaires de LibreCity	(fr) Les Escales Documentaires de LibreCity	Libreville	2005	Last edition in 2017	Official site	
Festival International Cinéma et Liberté de LibreCity	(fr) Festival International Cinéma et Liberté de LibreCity	Libreville	2024	Numerous training workshops	Official site	

== Gambia ==
Name	Original / international name	City	Created	Details	Official site	Month
Khoros Film Festival	Khoros Film Festival	Banjul	2022	African and French short films	(en) Official site	
Cinekambiya International Film Festival	Cinekambiya International Film Festival	Banjul	2015	Mixed. International festival	(en) Official site	12

== Ghana ==
Name	Original / international name	City	Created	Details	Official site	Month
Black Star International Film Festival	Black Star International Film Festival	Accra	2016	Mixed. African and diaspora films	(en) Official site	
Festival of Films Africa	Festival of Films Africa	Accra	2012	African films	(en) Official site	

== Guinea ==
Name	Original / international name	City	Created	Details	Official site	Month
Festival de la Created Cinématographique de Guinée (FECCIG)	(fr) Festival de la Created Cinématographique de Guinée (FECCIG)	Coyah	2014	Followed by Festival des Premiers Films de l'Institut Supérieur des Arts de Guinée in 2016. African films and diaspora	(en) Official site	
Festival du film sur l'environnement de Conakry (FIFEC)	(fr) Festival du film sur l'environnement de Conakry (FIFEC)	Conakry	2016	Environmental films until 2020	(en) Official site	
Les 7jours DU 7e art	(fr) Les 7jours DU 7^{e} art	Conakry	2018	Mixed. Outdoors. International and Guinean cinema	(en) Official site	

== Guinea-Bissau ==
Name	Original / international name	City	Created	Details	Official site	Month
Bissau Film Meeting (BFM)	Bissau Film Meeting (BFM)	Malabo	2021	Guinea-Bissau and international films	(pt) Official site	

== Ivory Coast ==
Name	Original / international name	City	Created	Details	Official site	Month
Festival international du film des lagunes (FESTILAG)	(fr)Festival international du film des lagunes (FESTILAG)	Abidjan	2012	Mixed. International festival. Screenings in working-class neighborhoods	Official site	
Festival Clap Ivoire	(fr) Festival Clap Ivoire (Clap Ivoire)	Abidjan	2001	Short film competition for young directors from UEMOA countries	Official site	
Cine Droit Libre Abidjan	(fr) Cine Droit Libre Abidjan	Abidjan	2008	Mixed. Films committed to human rights and freedom of expression	Official site	
Festival du film d'animation d'Abidjan (FFAA)	Festival du film d'animation d'Abidjan (FFAA)	Abidjan	2018	Animation films	Official site	04
Nuit ivoirienne du septième art et de l'audiovisuel (NISA)	(fr) Nuit ivoirienne du septième art et de l'audiovisuel NISA	Abidjan	2020	Mixed. Ivorian cinema and television films	Official site	
Festival international du film documentaire de Porto-Novo (FIFDOPO)	(fr) Festival international du film documentaire de Porto-Novo (FIFDOPO)	Porto-Novo	2022	International documentaries	Official site	07

== Kenya ==
Name	Original / international name	City	Created	Details	Official site	Month
Eldoret Film Festival	Eldoret Film Festival	Eldoret	2018	Mixed. Kenyan films	Official site	04
African Film Festival	African Film Festival	Kisumu	2018	African and Diaspora Fictions	Official site	
Swahili International Film Festival & Awards (Siff Awards)	Swahili International Film Festival & Awards (Siff Awards)	Mombasa	2021	Films in Swahili	Official site	
Mombasa International Film Festival	Mombasa International Film Festival	Mombasa	2024			
Kalasha International TV and Film Market	Kalasha International TV and Film Market	Nairobi	2015	Market bringing together cinema professionals.	Official site	03
Lola Kenya Children's Screen	Lola Kenya Children's Screen	Nairobi	2005	Films involving children	Official site	
Out of Africa International Film Festival (OOAIFF)	Out of Africa International Film Festival (OOAIFF)	Nairobi	2004	Mixed. Kenyan and international films	Official site	04
Slum Film Festival	Slum Film Festival	Nairobi	2011	Mixed. Stories of bidonCitys	Official site	
Udada International Women's Film festival	Udada International Women's Film festival	Nairobi	2014	Women's films	Official site	
Grand International Film and Theatre festival	Grand International Film and Theatre festival	Nairobi	2015	Cinema and theater	Official site	07-08
FilmAid Kenya Film Festival	FilmAid Kenya Film Festival	Nairobi	2007	Health, law and environment themes	Official site	
Under Our Skin Festival International Festival on Human Rights	Under Our Skin Festival International Festival on Human Rights	Nairobi	2020	Human rights	Official site	11
Lake International PanAfrican Film Festival	Lake International PanAfrican Film Festival	Nairobi	2016	Mixed. Films in African languages	Official site	
Kenya International Sports Film Festival	Festival international Kenyan du film sportif	Nairobi	2015	Mixed. Sports movies	Official site	10
NBO Film Festival	NBO Film Festival	Nairobi	2021	Kenyan Short Films	Official site	10
Manyatta Screenings	Manyatta Screenings	Naivasha	2019	East African short film evening, outdoors. Biennial	Official site	
Pridelands Wildlife Film Festival	Pridelands Wildlife Film Festival	Watamu	2021	Natural heritage films	Official site	05
Kitale Film Week	Kitale Film Week	Kitale	2023	Mixed. African films	Official site	02

== Lesotho ==
Name	Original / international name	City	Created	Details	Official site	Month
Lesotho International Film Festival	Lesotho International Film Festival	Maseru	2011	Mixed. Films from Lesotho	Official site	

== Liberia ==
Name	Original / international name	City	Created	Details	Official site	Month
Journey Home Film Festival	Journey Home Film Festival	Monrovia	2022	Mixed. Liberian and African films	(en) Official site	06
KD International Film Festival	KD International Film Festival	Monrovia	2018	Mixed. Formerly KD Short Film Festival	Official site	

== Libya ==
Name	Original / international name	City	Created	Details	Official site	Month
Erato Film Festival	Erato Film Festival	Tripoli	2017	Human Rights Films. Short Films	(en) Official site	

== Madagascar ==
Name	Original / international name	City	Created	Details	Official site	Month
Rencontres du Film Court Madagascar	Rencontres du Film Court Madagascar	Antananarivo	2006	Short films	Official site	07
Viavy Film Festival	Viavy Film Festival	Antananarivo	2024	Films written, produced or directed by women	Official site	03

== Malawi ==
Name	Original / international name	City	Created	Details	Official site	Month
Malawi Film Festival	Malawi Film Festival	Lilongwe	2022	Mixed	Official site	
Lilongwe Shorts	Lilongwe Shorts	Lilongwe	2015	Short films	(en) Official site	

== Mali ==
Name	Original / international name	City	Created	Details	Official site	Month
Cinéma Numérique Ambulant Mali	(fr) Cinéma Numérique Ambulant Mali	Bamako	2004	Traveling cinema of the Malian Association of Traveling Digital Cinema (CNA Mali)	(en) Official site	
Ciné Droit Libre Bamako	(fr) Ciné Droit Libre Bamako	Bamako	2014	Films on human rights	(en) Official site	
Cinéma du réel - festival international du film documentaire	(fr) Cinéma du réel – festival international du film documentaire	Bamako	1978	Malian and international documentary films	(en) Official site	03
Festival du film sur les violences basées sur le genre	(fr) Festival du film sur les violences basées sur le genre	Bamako, Segou	2019	Films sur les violences faites aux femmes et aux jeunes filles		
Semaine nationale du film africain de Bamako (SENAFAB)	(fr) Semaine nationale du film africain de Bamako (SENAFAB)	Bamako	2004	Mixed. Organised by the Centre National de la Cinématographie du Mali (CNCM)	Official site	
Rencontres cinématographiques de Bamako	(fr) Rencontres cinématographiques de Bamako	Bamako	2005	Festival organised by the Union of Creators and Entrepreneurs of the Cinema and Audiovisual Industries of Western Africa of Souleymane Cissé	(en) Official site	
Festival International de Nyamina	(fr) Festival International de Nyamina	Bamako	2003	Festival initiated by Souleymane Cissé	(en) Official site	
Écrans libres de l'Afrique de l'Ouest	(fr) Écrans libres de l'Afrique de l'Ouest	Bamako	2001	African film festival initiated by Cheick Oumar Sissoko	Official site	

== Mauritania ==
Name	Original / international name	City	Created	Details	Official site	Month
Festival international du film de Nouakchott	(fr) Festival international du film de Nouakchott (FIFN)	Nouakchott	2006	Mixed. Formerly Semaine nationale du film (SENAF) organized by the house of filmmakers, resumed in 2023	Official site	

== Mauritius ==
Name	Original / international name	City	Created	Details	Official site	Month
Île Courts International Short Film Festival	(fr) Festival international du court métrage de Maurice	Port Louis	2007	Ended. The festival's last edition was in 2018.	Official site	
Mauritius Cinema Week	Mauritius Cinema Week	Port Louis	2017	Mixed. State Festival	Official site	
Phare International Film Festival	Phare International Film Festival	Port Louis	2020	Mixed. Local and international festival initiated by Mauritian filmmakers.	Official site	12

== Morocco ==
Name	Original / international name	City	Created	Details	Official site	Month
Issni N'Ourgh International Festival of Amazigh Film or Golden Crown Festival	(fr) Couronne d'or (FINIFA)	Agadir	2009	Amazigh cinema	Official site	
International University Festival Cine-Literature of Agadir	(fr) Festival Universitaire International Ciné-lettres-d’Agadir (FUICLA)	Agadir	2023	School and student films	Official site	
SOUSS International Short Film Festival Ait Melloul - Agadir	SOUSS International Short Film Festival Ait Melloul – Agadir	Agadir	2008	International short films	Official site	
Agadir International Documentary Festival (FIDADOC)	(fr) Festival international de film Documentaire à Agadir (FIDADOC)	Agadir	2008	International documentary cinema	Official site	
Agadir Film and Migration Festival	(fr) Festival cinéma et migrations d'Agadir	Agadir	2003	Free festival	Official site	11
Festival Cèdre Universel du court métrage Azrou/ Festival Cèdre Universel du court métrage Ifrane	(fr) Festival Cèdre Universel du court métrage Azrou/Ifrane	Azrou, Ifrane	1999	International documentary cinema	Official site	
The Fez International Film Festival (FIFF)	(fr) Le Festival international du film de Fès (FIFF)	Fez	2020	Mixed. International	Official site	
Ciné-Ville Festival of Fez	(fr) Festival Ciné-Ville de Fès (Rencontre du Film Marocain)	Fez	2020	Mixed. International, City theme	Official site	
Casablanca Arab Film Festival	Casablanca Arab Film Festival	Casablanca	2018	Mixed. International, Arab cinema	Official site	09
International Student Film Festival (FIFE)	International Student Film Festival (FIFE)	Casablanca	2023	Mixed. International, school films	Official site	
International Festival of Environmental Films of Chefchaouen	(fr) Festival International Des films D'environnement de Chefchaouen	Chefchaouen	2010	Mixed. International	Official site	06
Dakhla film festival	(fr) Festival international du film de Dakhla	Dakhla	2012	Mixed. International	Official site	09
Al Hoceima International Film Festival	Festival International du Film d'Alhoceima	Al Hoceima	2020	Moroccan and international films	Official site	
African Film Festival in Khouribga (FCAK)	(fr) Festival du cinéma africain de Khouribga (FCAK)	Khouribga	1977	Mixed. African cinema	Official site	05
Khouribga International Documentary Film Festival	(fr) Festival international du film documentaire de Khouribga (AFIFDOK)	Khouribga	2009	Documentary cinema	Official site	
Marrakech International Film Festival	(fr) Festival International du film de Marrakech	Marrakesh	2001	Mixed. International	Official site	07
Festival international de cinéma d'animation de Meknès	(fr) Festival international de cinéma d'animation de Meknès (FICAM)	Meknes	2000	Animation	Official site	05
International Festival of Cinema and Shared Memory	(fr) Festival International de Cinéma et Mémoire Commune	Nador	2023	Documentaries. International	Official site	05
Kasbah Short Film Festival	Festival de la kasbah du court métrage à Ouarzazate	Ouarzazate	2013	Short films	[22]	10
Oujda Festival of North African Cinema	(fr) Festival maghrébin du film Oujda	Oujda	2012	Mixed. Maghreb Films	Official site	
Rabat International Author Film Festival	(fr) Festival International du cinéma d'auteur de Rabat (FICAR)	Rabat	1994	Mixed. Author's cinema	Official site	11
Festival national du film (FNF)	(fr) Festival national du film (FNF)	Rabat	1982	Moroccan films	Official site	
Morocco Shorts International Film Festival	Morocco Shorts International Film Festival	Rabat	2019	Moroccan and international short films	Official site	
Moroccan Youth Film Festival (MYFF)	Moroccan Youth Film Festival (MYFF)	Rabat	2022	Mixed. International	Official site	
Rabat International Children and Family Film Festival (RICAF)	(fr) Festival international du film familial de Rabat	Rabat	2018	Mixed. International	Official site	11
Rabat-Comedy International Film Festival	(fr)Festival International du Film Rabat-Comedy	Rabat	2019	Festival dedicated to comedy	Official site	06
Morocco Adventure Film Festival (MAFF)	Morocco Adventure Film Festival (MAFF)	Rabat	2019	Adventure and travel films	Official site	
Festival Handifilm de Rabat	(fr) Festival Handifilm de Rabat	Rabat	2007	Films about disability	Official site	12
Semaines du cinéma européen	(fr) Semaines du cinéma européen	Rabat, Tangier, Casablanca Marrakesh	1991	Organized by the European Union in Morocco	[23]	02-03
Festival Cinéma sans frontières	(fr) Festival Cinéma sans frontières	Saïdia	2015	Mixed. Moroccan and international cinema	Official site	
International Women's Film Festival in Salé	(fr) Festival international du film de femmes de Salé (FIFFS)	Salé	2004	Women's cinema	Official site	09
International Film Festival of Cinema & Sea	(fr) Festival International cinéma et la Mer	Sidi Ifni	2018	Sea theme	Official site	
Festival national du film de Tangeir	(fr) Festival national du film de Tanger	Tangier	2008	Mixed. Moroccan cinema	Official site	
Mediterranean Short Film Festival of Tangier	(fr) Festival du Court-Métrage Méditerranéen de Tanger	Tangier	2008	Short films from the Mediterranean	[24]	
International Film School Festival Tetouan	(fr) International Film School Festival Tetouan	Tétouan	2015	Mixed. International, school films	Official site	11
Tetouan International Mediterranean Film Festival	(fr) Festival International du Cinéma Méditerranéen de Tétouan (FICMT)	Tétouan	1995	Mixed. International	Official site	04-05
International Arab-African Documentary Film Festival	(fr) Festival International Arabo Africain du film Documentaire de Zagora	Zagora	2012	Documentary cinema	Official site	11
Festival international du film transsaharien	(fr) Festival international du film transsaharien	Zagora	2013	Mixed. International	Official site	

== Mozambique ==
Name	Original / international name	City	Created	Details	Official site	Month
Dockanema	Dockanema	Maputo	2006	documentary cinema. No recent editions (Has not taken place since 2012)	(pt) Official site	
Mozambique African Film Week	(fr) Semaine du cinéma africain du Mozambique	Maputo	2016	In partnership with the University of Bayreuth (Has not taken place since 2020)	(pt) Official site	
Kugoma	Kugoma	Maputo	2015	Short films	(pt) Official site	
Instidoc	Instidoc	Maputo	2014	Institutional documentaries of NGOs (Has not taken place since 2018)	(pt) Official site	

== Namibia ==
Name	Original / international name	City	Created	Details	Official site	Month
International Film Festival of Oranjemund	International Film Festival of Oranjemund	Oranjemund	2017	Free screenings. No recent edition.	(en) Official site	

== Niger ==
Name	Original / international name	City	Created	Details	Official site	Month
Toukountchi Festival	Festival Toukountchi	Niamey	2016	Mixed. African films.	Official site	
Forum Africain du Film Documentaire de Niamey	(fr) Forum Africain du Film Documentaire de Niamey	Niamey	2006	Mixed. African documentaries.	Official site	
Festival du film pour l’environnement de Niamey (FIFEN)	(fr) Festival du film pour l’environnement de Niamey (FIFEN)	Niamey	2005	Environmental films. Not since 2008.	Official site	
Festival international de film sur les droits de l’homme (FIFFIDHO)	(fr) Festival international de film sur les droits de l’homme (FIFFIDHO)	Niamey	2012	Promotion of human rights	Official site	

== Nigeria ==
Name	Original / international name	City	Created	Details	Official site	Month
Zuma international Film Festival	Zuma international Film Festival	Abuja	1992	Mixed. International festival	(en) Official site	12
Abuja International Film Festival	Abuja International Film Festival	Abuja	2004	Mixed. African films from Nigeria and the African diaspora	(en) Official site	10–11
Coal City Film Festival	Coal City Film Festival	Enugu	2020	Mixed. Nigerian films	(en) Official site	03
Kaduna International Film Festival	Kaduna International Film Festival	Kaduna	2018	Mixed. International festival	(en) Official site	08
Best of Nollywood Awards	Best of Nollywood Awards	Ikeja	2009	Nigerian films Featured by Best of Nollywood Magazine	Official site	
Nollywood Movies Awards	Nollywood Movies Awards	Lagos	2012	Mixed. Nigerian Film Festival Organized by Nollywood Movies TV	Official site	
Eko International Film Festival (EKOIFF)	Eko International Film Festival (EKOIFF)	Lagos	2009	Mixed. International and Nigerian films	(en) Official site	04
Lagos International Film Festival – (LAGIFF)	Lagos International Film Festival – (LAGIFF)	Lagos	1995	Mixed. International festival	(en) Official site	
Lights, Camera Africa Film Festival	Lights, Camera Africa Film Festival	Lagos	2011	Mixed. Films and debates on social issues	(en) Official site	
Africa International Film Festival (AFRIFF)	Africa International Film Festival	Lagos	2010	Mixed. African films	(en) Official site	11
Universal Movie Awards	Universal Movie Awards	Lagos	2020	Mixed. International cinema and television trophies	(en) Official site	11
The S16 Film Festival	The S16 Film Festival	Lagos	2016	Mixed. Independent festival founded by the Surreal16 Collective	(en) Official site	12
Eastern Nigeria International Film Festival (ENIFF)	Eastern Nigeria International Film Festival (ENIFF)	Enugu	2020		Official site	
Africa International Human Rights Film Festival	Africa International Human Rights Film Festival	Lagos	2021	Mixed. Human rights	(en) Official site	12
Uyo Film and Theatre Festival	Uyo Film and Theatre Festival	Uyo	2018	Mixed. International cinema and television trophies	(en) Official site	

== Réunion ==
Name	Original / international name	City	Created	Details	Official site	Month
Festival court derrière	(fr) Festival court derrière	Château Morange, Saint-Denis	2018	Short films from Reunion Island and the African diaspora	Official site	10
Festival du Film Citoyen de la Réunion	(fr) Festival du Film Citoyen de la Réunion	Le Port (La Réunion)	2022	Mixed. On the theme of civic, cultural and activist action	Official site	
Festival du film de Femmes - Le Temps Des Femmes	(fr) Festival du film de Femmes – Le Temps Des Femmes	Multiple cities	2020	Mixed. The conditions of women in the world	Official site	02
Même Pas Peur International Film Festival	(fr) Festival Même pas peur	Saint-Philippe	2010	International fantastic cinema	Official site	04
Festival du Film Scientifique	(fr) Festival du Film Scientifique	Saint-Denis	2000	Mixed. Free	Official site	12
Festival international du film de l’Education (FIFE)	(fr) Festival international du film de l’Education FIFE	Saint-Pierre	2006	Mixed. Issues of education, childhood and youth	Official site	05
Festival du film d'aventure de La Réunion	(fr) Festival du film d'aventure de La Réunion	Saint-Leu	2005		Official site	05
Festival International du Film de l'Océan Indien (FIFOI)	(fr) Festival International du Film de l'Océan Indien FIFOI	Saint-Paul	2024	Mixed	Official site	04

== Rwanda ==
Name	Original / international name	City	Created	Details	Official site	Month
Rwanda Film Festival	Rwanda Film Festival	Kigali	2005	Main prize: Hillywood Award	(en) Official site	
Mashariki African Film Festival (MAFF)	Mashariki African Film Festival	Kigali	2014	African films	(en) Official site	11
Urusaro International Women Film Festival	Urusaro International Women Film Festival	Kigali	2015	Women's films	(en) Official site	06
Kigali CineJunction	Kigali CineJunction	Kigali	2023	On Black Aesthetics	(en) Official site	

== São Tomé and Príncipe ==
Name	Original / international name	City	Created	Details	Official site	Month
São Tomé FestFilm – International Film Festival of São Tomé and Príncipe	São Tomé FestFilm – International Film Festival of São Tomé and Príncipe	São Tomé	2017	Mixed. Associated with São Tomé Film Lab	(pt) Official site	10

== Senegal ==
Name	Original / international name	City	Created	Details	Official site	Month
Festival de Cinema Image et vie (FESTIV)	(fr) Festival de Cinema Image et vie (FESTIV)	Dakar	2001	Mixed. Promotion of Senegalese and African cinema	Official site	11
Dakar courts	(fr) Dakar courts	Dakar	2018	Senegalese and African short films	Official site	12
Festival Films Femmes Afrique (FFFA)	(fr) Festival Films Femmes Afrique (FFFA)	Dakar	2014	African films centering women's stories and voices.	Official site	05
Festival Afrikabok	Festival Afrikabok	Dakar	2014	Mixed. Traveling open-air cinema festival	Official site	
Festival Itinérant du Film d'École de Mboro FIFE	(fr) Festival Itinérant du Film d'École de Mboro (FIFE)	Dakar	2019	Films from cinema schools in Senegal, Africa and other continents	Official site	05
Festival Kimpa Vita	Festival Kimpa Vita	Dakar	2021	Pan-African feminist and eco-responsible cultural festival	Official site	
Dakar Séries – Festival panafricain des séries	(fr) Dakar Séries – Festival panafricain des séries	Dakar	2023	African series festival initiated by Burkinabe actor Issiaka Sawadogo and producer Séraphine Angoula	Official site	10
Festival international du film de quartier de Dakar	(fr) Festival international du film de quartier de Dakar	Dakar	1999	No longer has any edition at the moment.		
Festival à Sahel Ouvert (FASO)	(fr) Festival à Sahel Ouvert (FASO)	Mboumba	2010	Promotion of heritage and access to culture in large rural areas of Africa.	Official site	
Stlouis'Docs	(fr) Festival International du Film Documentaire de St Louis (Stlouis' Docs)	Saint-Louis	2014	Senegalese and African documentaries	Official site	04-05
Le gala international du court métrage de Saint-Louis	(fr) Le gala international du court métrage de Saint-Louis	Saint-Louis	2020	African short films, audience award	Official site	06
African Feminist Film and Research Festival	(fr) Festival Africain du Film et de la Recherche Féministes	Toubab Dialaw	2023	Feminist festival	Official site	11

== Sierra Leone ==
Name	Original / international name	City	Created	Details	Official site	Month
Sierra Leone International Film Festival (SLIFF)	Sierra Leone International Film Festival (SLIFF)	Freetown	2012		(en) Official site	

== Somalia ==
Established in 1987, the Mogadishu Pan-African and Arab Film Festival (Mogpaafis) was one of the leading African festivals. On 22 September 2021, the first film screening in thirty years was held, featuring Somali films.

Name	Original / international name	City	Created	Details	Official site	Month
FilmAid Film Festival	FilmAid Film Festival	Dadaab Refugee camp	2012	Films of young Somalis living in the camp	(en) Official site	10

== South Africa ==
Name	Original / international name	City	Created	Details	Official site	Month
Kasi Vibe Film Festival	Kasi Vibe Film Festival	Alberton (Gauteng)	2017	South African films	(en) Official site	
Cape Town International Animation Festival	Cape Town International Animation Festival	Cape Town	2021	Animation	(en) Official site	04
International Tourism Film Festival Africa	International Tourism Film Festival Africa	Cape Town	2017	TV ads, promotional films, video campaigns, videos for social media, video blogs, documentaries about tourism and the travel industry	(en) Official site	06
South African Horrorfest	South African HorrorFest	Cape Town	2005	Mixed, international, horror films	(en) Official site	10–11
Celludroid Sci-Fi Film Festival	Celludroid Sci-Fi Film Festival	Cape Town	2018	Mixed, international, science fiction and animation	(en) Official site	08-09
Out in Africa South African Gay and Lesbian Film Festival	Out in Africa South African Gay and Lesbian Film Festival	Cape Town and Johannesburg	1994	LGBT films. Inactive since 2014	(en) Official site	
Encounters South African International Documentary Film Festival	Encounters South African International Documentary Film Festival	Cape Town	1999	African and International films.	(en) Official site	06
Cape Town Squad International Film Festival	Cape Town Squad International Film Festival (CTSIFF)	Cape Town	2022	Independent African and international short films. As of 2024, the only African festival with an AI category award	(en) Official site	09
Ekurhuleni International Film Festival	Ekurhuleni International Film Festival	Cape Town	2017	Emerging African and international filmmakers. Inactive.	(en) Official site	11–12
The South African Independent Film Festival	The South African Independent Film Festival	Cape Town and Johannesburg	2017	Local and international independent film, including music videos.	(en) Official site	11
RapidLion - The South African International Film Festival	RapidLion – The South African International Film Festival	Johannesburg	2015	Special focus on films from BRICS countries. Inactive since 2023.	(en) Official site	
Sound On Screen Film Festival	Sound On Screen Film Festival	Cape Town	2018	Narrative films with music related subjects documentaries musicals, concert films, short films	(en) Official site	03-04
Kleinkaap Short Film Festival	Kleinkaap Short Film Festival	Centurion	2018	Hosted by Twin Hearts Productions and Kleinkaap Boutique Hotel. South African and international short films.	(en) Official site	04
Durban International Film Festival	Durban International Film Festival (DIFF)	Durban	1979	South Africa's oldest and largest festival	(en) Official site	07
Music Imbizo Film Festival	Music Imbizo Film Festival	Durban	2012	Music industry related films from across the African continent and the diaspora. Feature films, short films, long format music videos, documentaries.	(en) Official site	08
Joburg Film Festival	Joburg Film Festival	Johannesburg	2019	Mixed, African and international	(en) Official site	02-03
Reel to Reality Festival	Reel to Reality Festival	Johannesburg	2021	Run by creative agency Behind Her Lens Visuals. Mixed films, by African and filmmakers within the African diaspora.	(en) Official site	05-06
G-African Film Festival	G-African Film Festival	Johannesburg	2023	Mixed, African films	(en) Official site	10
Northern Cape Film & Market Festival	Northern Cape Film & Market Festival	Kimberley	2003	Promotes the film and TV production in the Northern Cape.	(en) Official site	04
Ugu International Film Festival	Ugu International Film Festival	Kokstad	2013	Founded by Zindela Pictures Group, in partnership with local organizations such as Nkonyeni Municipality, South Coast (KwaZulu-Natal) Tourism and Investment Enterprise (SCTIE).	(en) Official site	09
Mpumalanga International Film Festival	Mpumalanga International Film Festival	Mbombela	2019	Mixed, African and international, independent cinema	(en) Official site	08
uMgungundlovu Film Festival	uMgungundlovu Film Festival	Pietermaritzburg	2018	Prioritizes South African film and women, youth and people living with disabilities.	(en) Official site	11
Pretoria Film Festival	Pretoria Film Festival	Pretoria	2023	Mixed, International	(en) Official site	07
Africa Human Rights Film Festival (AHRFF)	Africa Human Rights Film Festival (AHRFF)	Randburg	2018	Human rights and climate change	(en) Official site	10
Africa Rising International Film Festival	Africa Rising International Film Festival	Johannesburg	2018	Mixed, panAfricain	(en) Official site	12
Heartlands Film Festival Africa	Cineba Film Festival	Bloemfontein	2023	African experimental and art films and experimental.	(en) Official site	04

== South Sudan ==
Name	Original / international name	City	Created	Details	Official site	Month
Juba Film Festival	Juba Film Festival	Juba	2015	Mixed. Promotion of human rights and peace	(en) Official site	

== Sudan ==
Name	Original / international name	City	Created	Details	Official site	Month
Sudan Independent Film Festival	Sudan Independent Film Festival	Khartoum	2014	Independent cinema, especially Sudanese	(en) Official site	

== Tanzania ==
Name	Original / international name	City	Created	Details	Official site	Month
Zanzibar International Film Festival (ZIFF)	Zanzibar International Film Festival (ZIFF)	Zanzibar	1997	East Africa's largest film, music and arts festival – Main Prize: Golden Dhow	(en) Official site	08
Arusha African Film Festival (AAFF)	Arusha African Film Festival (AAFF)	Arusha	2016	Mixed	(en) Official site	
Sauti Zetu Film Festival	Sauti Zetu Film Festival	Dar es Salaam	2023	Swahili and international films	(en) Official site	10
Kwetu International Animation Film Festival (KIAFF)	Kwetu International Animation Film Festival (KIAFF)	Dar es Salaam	2022	Animation	(en) Official site	04

== Togo ==
Name	Original / international name	City	Created	Details	Official site	Month
Festival de Cinéma de Lomé (FESCILOM)	(fr) Festival de Cinéma de Lomé (FESCILOM)	Lomé	2014	Mixed. With meetings and training	Official site	
Festival de Film Court d’Atakpamé (FESFICA)	(fr) Festival de Film Court d’Atakpamé (FESFICA)	Atakpamé	2010	Short films	Official site	
Festival du Film Documentaire de Blitta (FESDOB)	(fr) Festival du Film Documentaire de Blitta (FESDOB)	Blitta	2014	Documentaries	Official site	
Festival de film grand public du Togo	Festival de film grand public du Togo	Lomé	2019	Promotion of commercial cinema	Official site	05
Festival Emergence	(fr) Festival Emergence	Lomé	2014	Mixed.	Official site	
Festival Africain des Films de Femmes Cinéastes (FAFFCI)	(fr) Festival Africain des Films de Femmes Cinéastes (FAFFCI)	Lomé	2018	Mixed. Films by women from Africa and elsewhere	Official site	
Festival De Cinéma Des Monts Kabyè (FECIMONKA)	(fr) Festival De Cinéma Des Monts Kabyè (FECIMONKA)	Kara	2023	Mixed. Various training courses	Official site	09
Festival international Gbaka Animation (FIGA)	(fr) Festival international Gbaka Animation (FIGA)	Lomé	2024	Animation	Official site	10

== Tunisia ==
Name	Original / international name	City	Created	Details	Official site	Month
Carthage Film Festival	(fr) Journées cinématographiques de Carthage	Carthage	1966	Regional festival whose eligible films must have a director from Africa or the Middle East – Main prize: Tanit d’or	Official site	
Manarat Mediterranean Film Festival	(fr) Festival du Cinéma Méditerranéen Manarat	Hammam-Lif	2019	Projections on the beaches	Official site	
Cinematographic Framework of Hergla	(fr) Rencontres cinématographiques de Hergla	Hammamet	2017	Festival dedicated to female directors	Official site	
Gabès Cinéma Fen	(fr) Gabès Cinéma Fen	Gabès	2017	Cinema, video art and virtual reality	Official site	04-05
Journées Cinématographiques Méditerranéennes de Chenini	(fr) Journées Cinématographiques Méditerranéennes de Chenini JCMC-Gabès	Gabès	2005	At the Chenini oasis in Gabès. Mixed.	Official site	
Festival international du film amateur de Kélibia FIFAK	(fr) Festival international du film amateur de Kélibia (FIFAK)	Kélibia	1964	Organized by the Tunisian Federation of Amateur Filmmakers	Official site	08
Festival du Court au Kef FCKEF	(fr) Festival du Court au Kef (FCKEF)	El Kef	2016	Short films. Initiative the Association des Arts pour le Cinéma et le Théâtre du Kef	Official site	
Festival international du film Documentaire et court métrage de Médenine FIFDOC	(fr) Festival international du film Documentaire et court métrage de Médenine (FIFDOC)	Médenine	2014	Short films and documentary, competitive	Official site	11
Cinétoile	Cinétoile	Nabeul	2018	Free screenings of short films	Official site	07
Festival International du Film pour l'Enfance et la Jeunesse (FIFEJ)	(fr) Festival International du Film pour l'Enfance et la Jeunesse (FIFEJ)	Sousse	1991	Historical festival, youth films	Official site	
Mawjoudin Queer Film Festival	(fr) Festival du film queer de Mawjoudin	Tunis	2018	LGBTQI+ films and arts organized by Mawjoudin	Official site	
DocuMed-Festival du Cinéma Documentaire Méditerranéen en Tunisie	(fr) DocuMed-Festival du Cinéma Documentaire Méditerranéen en Tunisie	Tunis	2021	Mediterranean documentaries	Official site	04
Panorama International Short Film Festival (PISFF)	(fr) Panorama International Short Film Festival PISFF	Tunis	2014	Short films	Official site	02
Human Screen Festival Child (HSFC)	Human Screen Festival Child (HSFC)	Tunis	2005		Official site [archive]	09

== Uganda ==
Name	Original / international name	City	Created	Details	Official site	Month
Amakula International Film Festival	Amakula International Film Festival	Kampala	2004	Mixed	[25]	
Uganda Film Festival Awards	Uganda Film Festival Awards	Kampala	2013	Mixed	(en) Official site	05-06
Pearl International Film Festival	Pearl International Film Festival	Kampala	2011	Mixed. Ugandan, African and international films	(en) Official site	
Euro-Uganda Film Festival (EUFF)	Euro-Uganda Film Festival (EUFF)	Kampala	2011	Mixed. Ugandan, African and European films	(en) Official site	

| Uganda humanrights film festival (UHRFF) |Uganda humanrights film festiv (UHRFF) |kampala and Entebbe |2024 |mixed |(en) Official

== Zambia ==
Name	Original / international name	City	Created	Details	Official site	Month
Shungu Namutitima International Film Festival of Zambia (SHUNAFFoZ)	Shungu Namutitima International Film Festival of Zambia (SHUNAFFoZ)	Lusaka	1997	Mixed	(en) Official site	
Zambia Short Film Festival	Zambia Short Film Festival	Lusaka	2013	Short films	(en) Official site	08
SOTAMBE Zambia International Film Festival (ZAMIFF)	SOTAMBE Zambia International Film Festival (ZAMIFF)	Ndola	2014	Cinema and television, Southern Africa	(en) Official site	09

== Zimbabwe ==
Name	Original / international name	City	Created	Details	Official site	Month
Zimbabwe International Film Festival (ZIFF)	Zimbabwe International Film Festival	Harare	1998	Mixed. International and African	(en) Official site	
International Images Film Festival for Women (IIFF)	International Images Film Festival for Women	Harare	2003	Women's Cinema	(en) Official site	11
Varsity Film Expo	Varsity Film Expo	Harare	2022	University festival	(en) Official site	

== African film festivals outside the continent ==
Only festivals whose program includes a significant number of films from Africa and its diasporas are included here.

=== France ===
Name	Original / international name	City/Country	Created	Details	Official site	Month
Festival du Film Francophone d’Albi (Les Œillades)	Festival du Film Francophone d’Albi (Les Œillades)	Albi	1997	Mixed	Official site	11
Festival international du film d'Amiens (FIFAM)	Festival international du film d'Amiens (FIFAM)	Amiens	1980	Mixed. Large place for African films	Official site	11
Festival Cinémas d'Afrique Angers	Festival Cinémas d'Afrique	Angers	2004	Mixed. Biennial	Official site	05
Angoulême Francophone Film Festival	Festival du film francophone d'Angoulême (FFA)	Angoulême	2007	Mixed	Official site	08-09
Festival des Cinémas d'Afrique du pays d'Apt (FCAPA)	Festival des Cinémas d'Afrique du pays d'Apt FCAPA	Apt	2003	Mixed	Official site	11
Ẅ XOOL Festival	Ẅ XOOL Festival	Aubervilliers	2020	Biennial. Short films by Afro-descendant female directors	Official site	10
Maghreb, Si loin... Si proche	Maghreb, Si loin... Si proche	Aude, Pyrénées Orientales	1996	Mixed. Cinemaginaire Association	Official site	01
Lumières d'Afrique	Lumières d'Afrique	Besançon	1996	Mixed. Born from the will of 18 associations	Official site	11
Festival international du film indépendant Berck (Cinémondes)	Festival international du film indépendant (Cinémondes)	Berck-sur-Mer	2004	Previously in Lille. Mixed. Many African films	Official site	10
Afriques en vision	Afriques en vision	Bordeaux	2021	Music, cinema and conferences	Official site	11–12
Africajarc	Africajarc	Cajarc	1999	Mixed	Official site	07
Festival international du film panafricain FIFP	Festival international du film panafricain (FIFP)	Cannes	2003	Mixed	Official site	10
Cinéalma	Rencontres cinématographiques CinéAlma, l'âme de la Méditerranée (Cinéalma)	Carros	2008	Mixed. Mediterranean cinema	Official site	
Ciné Bala	Ciné Bala : Festival des cinémas d'Afrique (Ciné Bala)	Chambéry	2014	Mixed.	Official site	01
Clermont-Ferrand International Short Film Festival	Festival du court métrage de Clermont-Ferrand	Clermont-Ferrand	1990	Short films. Regards d’Afrique selection and African films in the competitions	Official site	01-02
Festival du Film arabe de Fameck	Festival du Film arabe de Fameck/Val de Fensch	Fameck	1990	Mixed. Arab cinema	Official site	10
FEMI-Festival régional et international du cinéma de Guadeloupe	FEMI Festival régional et international du cinéma de Guadeloupe	Lamentin, Guadeloupe	1992	Mixed. Caribbean Cinemas	Official site	04
CineVision Sud Film Festival	CineVision Sud Film Festival (CinéVision Sud)	Lamentin, Guadeloupe	2018	Mixed. films from the Antilles-Guyana, overseas, the Greater Caribbean and French-speaking Africa	Official site	
Festival du Film francophone pour la Jeunesse	Festival du Film francophone pour la Jeunesse	Les Mureaux	2022	Mixed	Official site	02
Cinemas of the South Festival	Festival Cinémas du Sud (Regard Sud)	Lyon	1999	Mixed. Cinemas of the Maghreb and the Middle East	Official site	04
Visions d'Afrique	Visions d'Afrique	Marennes (Charente-Maritime), Saint-Pierre-d'Oléron	2009	Mixed	Official site	10
Aflam	Festival Aflam	Marseille	1978	Mixed	Official site	04
Festival internationale du film documentaire de Martinique (FIFDM)	Festival internationale du film documentaire de Martinique (FIFDM)	Martinique	2016	History and culture of Afro-descendants	Official site	04
Montpellier Mediterranean Film Festival	Festival du cinéma méditerranéen de Montpellier (Cinemed)	Montpellier	1978	Mixed. Mediterranean cinema	Official site	10
Three Continents Festival	Festival des 3 Continents	Nantes	1978	Mixed	Official site	11
Festival du film Franco-arabe	Festival du film Franco-arabe	Noisy-le-Sec	2011	Mixed. Links between French and Arab cultures	Official site	11
Festival international des films de la diaspora africaine	Festival international des films de la diaspora africaine FIFDA	Paris	2010	Mixed	Official site	
Kreyol international film festival	Kreyol international film festival	Paris	2023	Mixed. Highlighting Creole languages	Official site	09
Seytou Africa	Seytou Africa	Paris	2019	African documentaries	Official site	
NollywoodWeek Film Festival	Festival du cinéma nigérian	Paris	2013	Nigerian Cinema Only	Official site	05
L'Afrique fait son cinéma	L'Afrique fait son cinéma	Paris	2021	Mixed	Official site	07-08
Maghreb des films	Maghreb des films	Paris	2009	Mixed. Maghreb Films	Official site	06
Panorama des cinémas du Maghreb et du Moyen-Orient	Panorama des cinémas du Maghreb et du Moyen-Orient PCMMO	Paris	2005	Mixed. In Paris and Seine-Saint-Denis	Official site	02-03
Africlap Film Festival	Africlap Film Festival	Toulouse	2013	Mixed. Toulouse and Occitanie	Official site	11
Ciné Regards Africains	Ciné Regards Africains	Val-de-Marne	2009	Mixed	Official site	11–12
Festival du film court francophone – Un poing c'est court	Festival du film court francophone – Un poing c'est court	Vaulx-en-Velin	2000	Francophone short films	Official site	01
Festival cinémas et musiques d'Afrique	Festival cinémas et musiques d'Afrique	Vendôme	2022	Mixed. Initiated by the Afrivision association	Official site	

=== The rest of Europe ===
Name	Original / international name	City/Country	Created	Details	Official site	Month
Afrikamera	Afrikamera	Berlin, Germany	2007	Mixed. Annual theme	(de) Official site	11
Arab Film Festival Berlin (Alfilm)	(fr) Festival du film arabe de Berlin	Berlin, Germany	2009	Mixed	(de) Official site	04
Afrika Film Festival Köln	(fr) Festival du film africain de Cologne	Cologne, Germany	1988	Mixed	(de) Official site	11
Africa Alive Festival	Africa Alive Festival	Frankfurt-Am-Main, Germany	1994	Mixed, with an annual focus.	(de) Official site	02
Afrikanischen Filmfestival Hamburg	(fr) Festival du cinéma africain d'Hambourg	Hamburg, Germany	2012	Mixed	(de) Official site	11
Dokfest	Dokfest	Munich, Germany	2013	Documentaries. Formerly Africa Day, annex of DOK.fest München	(de) Official site	05
Tübingen Arabisches Filmfestival	Tübingen Arabisches Filmfestival	Tübingen, Germany	2004	Mixed. Arab cinema	(de) Official site	10
Afrika Filmfestival	Afrika Filmfestival	Louvain, Belgium	1996	Mixed. Africa and diasporas	(en) Official site	04-05
Festival International du Film Francophone de Namur	Festival International du Film Francophone de Namur (FIFF)	Namur, Belgium	1986	Mixed. Francophone cinema	(en) Official site	09-10
Festival Cinéma Méditerranéen de Bruxelles	Festival Cinéma Méditerranéen de Bruxelles – Cinemamed	Brussels, Belgium	1989	Mixed. Mediterranean cinema	(en) Official site	11–12
Aflam du Sud Festival	Aflam du Sud Festival	Brussels, Belgium	2012	Mixed. Arab cinema	(en) Official site	09-10
Festival of African Cinema	Festival de cinéma africain de Cordoue (FCAT)	Tarifa, Spain	2004	Mixed. Formerly known as the Tarifa or Cordoba African Film Festival.	(es) Official site	05-06
Afrikaldia	Afrikaldia	Vitoria-Gasteiz, Basque Country, Spain	2021	Mixed. Competitive	(es) Official site	10
Arab and Mediterranean Film Festival of Catalonia	(fr) Festival du film arabe et méditerranéen de la Catalogne	Barcelona, Spain	2006	Mixed. Organized by Sodepau, solidarity association	(ca) Official site	11
Traveling Festival of African Cinemas of Catalonia	(fr) Festival itinérant de Cinémas Africains de Catalogne	Catalonia, Spain	2022	Mixed	(ca) Official site \	
Barcelona Africa Film Festival	Festival Wallay!	Barcelona, Spain	2018	Mixed	(ca) Official site	06-11
African, Asian and Latin American Film Festival	(fr) Festival du cinéma d'Afrique, d'Asie et d'Amérique latine	Milan, Italy	1991	Mixed Organised by Associazione Centro Orientamento Educativo (it) (COE)	(it) Official site	05
AfryKamera	AfryKamera	Warsaw, Poland	2006	Mixed	(en) Official site	11
Film Africa	Film Africa	London, United Kingdom	2011	Mixed. Organised by the Royal African Society. Biennial	(en) Official site	10–11
London International Pan-African Film Festival	London International Pan-African Film Festival	London, United Kingdom	2023	Mixed	(en) Official site	10
Africa in Motion	Africa in Motion	Edinburgh, Scotland, United Kingdom	2006	Mixed. Created by academic Lizelle Bisschoff	(en) Official site	08-09
Cambridge African Film Festival (CAFF)	Cambridge African Film Festival	Cambridge, United Kingdom	2002	Mixed. Backed by the Cambridge Film Festival	(en) Official site	
CinemAfrica Film festival	CinemAfrica Film festival	Stockholm, Sweden	1998	Mixed. The largest African film festival in Northern Europe	(sv) Official site	10
Malmö Arab Film Festival	Festival du Film Arabe de Malmö	Malmö, Sweden	2011	Mixed. Arab cinemas	(sv) Official site	04
Festival cinémas d'Afrique Lausanne	Festival cinémas d'Afrique Lausanne	Lausanne, Switzerland	2007	Mixed. Films, debates and round tables	(sv) Official site	08
Festival international du film oriental de Genève	Festival international du film oriental de Genève	Geneva, Switzerland	2005	Mixed. Arab cinema	(sv) Official site	06
International Arab Film Festival Zürich	International Arab Film Festival Zürich	Zurich, Switzerland	2012	Mixed. Arab cinema	(sv) Official site	04

=== The rest of the world ===
Name	Original / international name	City/Country	Created	Details	Official site	Month
Africa Film Fest Australia	Africa Film Fest Australia	Sydney, Australia	2024	Mixed	(en) Official site	07
Aswad Film Festival	Aswad Film Festival	Dubai, UAE	2025		Official Site	
South African Film Festival	South African Film Festival	Sydney, Australia, Vancouver, Toronto, Canada, New Zealand, San Diego, United States of America	2019	Mixed	(en) Official site	05
African Cinema Showcase	Vitrine du cinéma africain	São Paulo, Brazil	2018	Mixed	(pt) Official site	09
African Movie Festival in Manitoba	African Movie Festival in Manitoba	Winnipeg, Canada	2018	Mixed	(en) Official site	09
Vues d'Afrique	Vues d'Afrique	Montréal, Canada	1985	Mixed. Historical festival	Official site	04
Montreal International Black Film Festival	Festival International du Film Black de Montréal	Montréal, Canada	2004	Mixed	Official site	09
Fade to Black Festival	Festival Fondu au noir	Montréal, Canada	2011	Mixed. During Black History Month	Official site	02
Quibdó Africa Film Festival	Quibdó Africa Film Festival	Quibdó, Colombia	2019	Mixed	(en) Official site	09
African Film Festival Atlanta	African Film Festival Atlanta	Atlanta, United States	2020	Mixed	(en) Official site	09
Black Film Festival Atlanta	Black Film Festival Atlanta	Atlanta, United States	2020	Mixed	(en) Official site [archive]	10
Black Harvest Film Festival	Black Harvest Film Festival	Chicago, United States	1994	Mixed. National and diaspora films	(en) Official site	11
The African Film Festival (TAFF)	The African Film Festival	Dallas, United States	2014	Mixed	(en) Official site	06
New York African Film Festival	New York African Film Festival	New York, United States	1990	Mixed	(en) Official site	05
African Diaspora International Film Festival (ADIFF)	African Diaspora International Film Festival	New York, United States	1993	Mixed	(en) Official site	05
Pan African Film Festival (PAFF)	Festival panafricain du film de Los Angeles	Los Angeles, United States	1992	Mixed	(en) Official site	02
Cascade Festival of African Films	Cascade Festival of African Films	Portland, United States	1991	Mixed. Historical festival	(en) Official site	02-03
San Diego Black Film Festival	San Diego Black Film Festival	San Diego, United States	2002	Mixed. Formerly Noir Film Festival	(en) Official site	01-02
Silicon Valley African Film Festival	Silicon Valley African Film Festival	San José, United States	2000	Mixed. African films	(en) Official site	10
New African Film Festival	New African Film Festival	Silver Spring, United States	2004	Mixed. Contemporary African Cinema	(en) Official site	03
Rencontres Cinématographiques Du DMV	Rencontres Cinématographiques Du DMV	Silver Spring, United States	2024	Organisation of African, Caribbean and Pacific States Films in French	(en) Official site	11
African Film Festival Tel Aviv	Festival du film africain de Tel-Aviv					

== Annexes ==
=== Bibliography ===
- Claude Forest (2020). Festivals de cinéma en Afriques francophones. Images plurielles, scènes & écrans (in French). Paris: Éditions L'Harmattan. p. 234. ISBN 978-2-343-19428-8..
- et (en) UNESCO (2020). L'industrie du film en Afrique : tendances, défis et opportunités de croissance. UNESCO. p. 271. ISBN 978-92-3-200239-6.

=== Related articles ===
- List of film festivals
- List of film awards
