= L'Afrique fait son cinéma =

L'Afrique Fait Son Cinéma
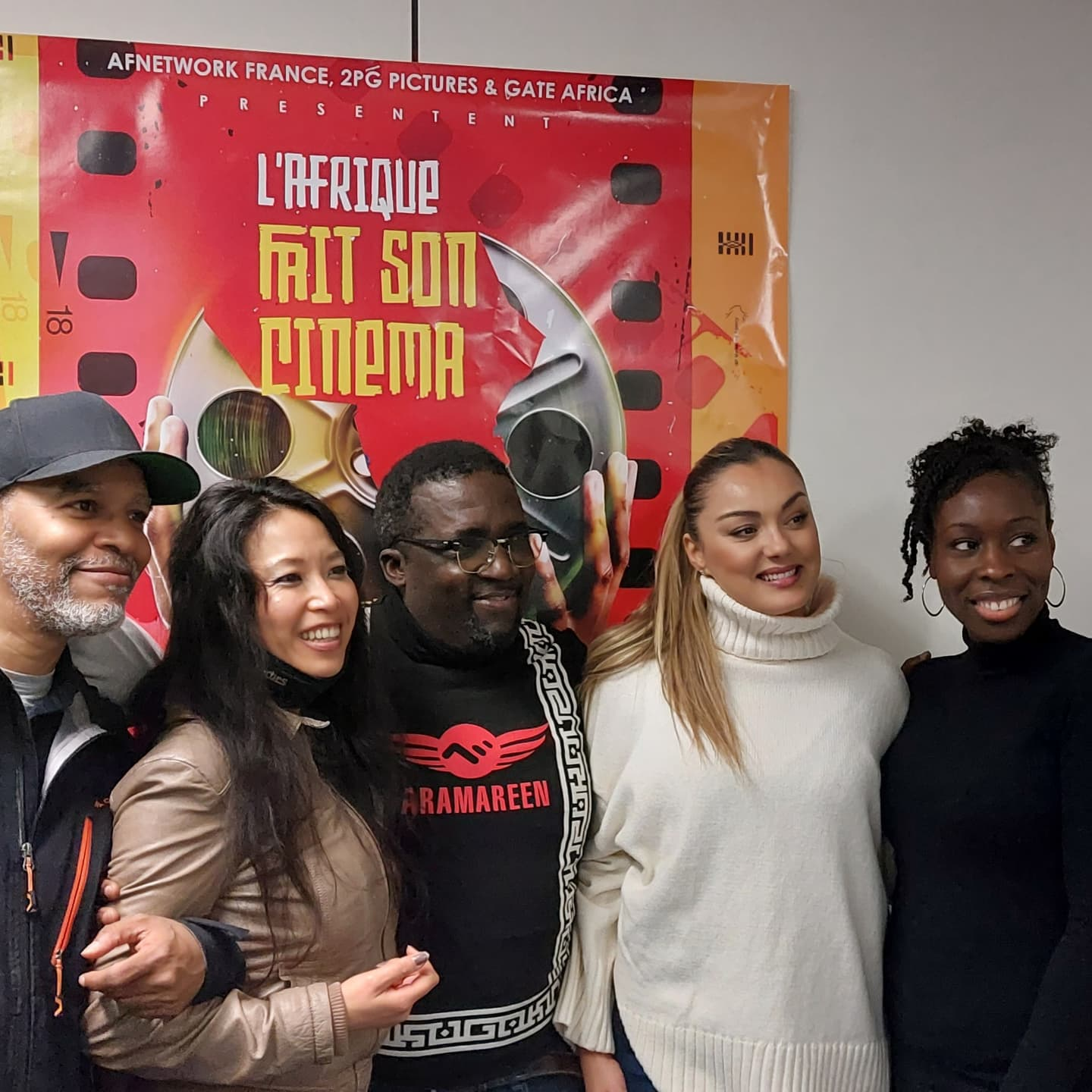
- Location: Paris, France
- Founded: 2019
- Founded by: Blaise Pascal Tanguy, Michael Kamuanga
- Awards: Ubuntu d'Or
- Hosted by: African Filmmakers Network Association (AFNETWORK)
- No. of films: 7 (as of 2025)
- Festival date: October (2019–2023); December (2025)
- Language: French, English
- Website: afsc.fr

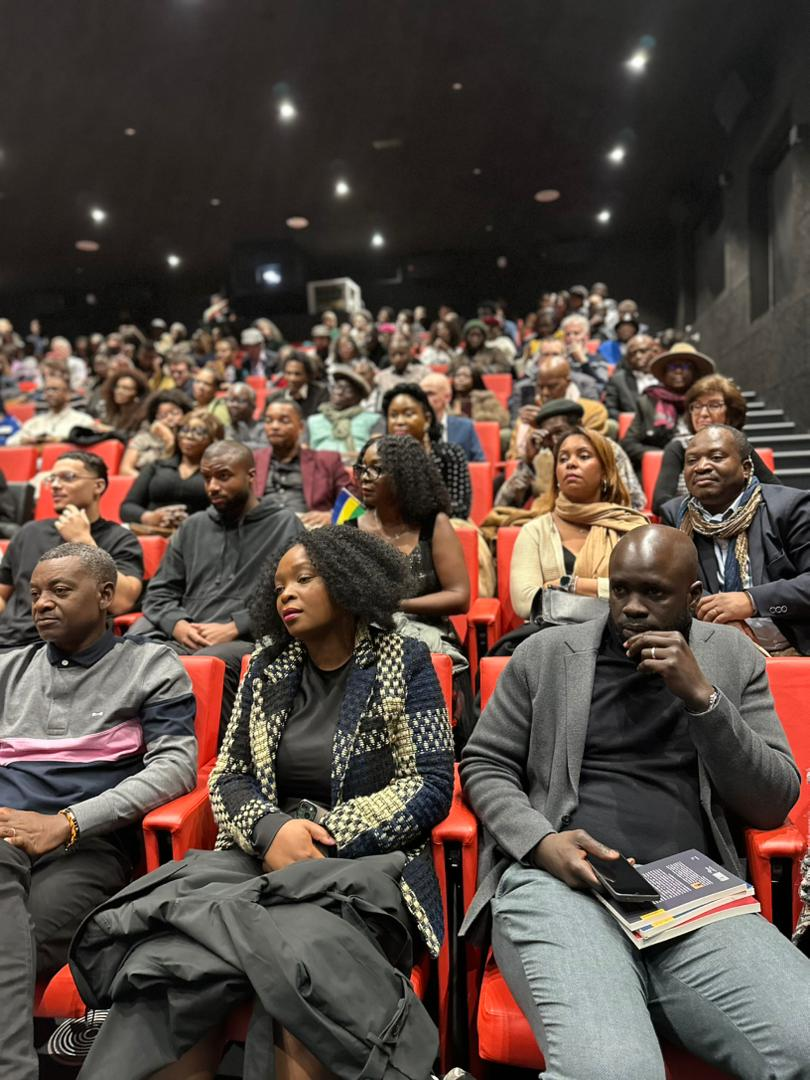

L'Afrique Fait Son Cinéma (Africa in Film), also known by the acronym AFSC, is an annual international film festival held in Paris, France, dedicated to African and Caribbean cinema. The festival presents feature and short films, documentaries and animation by African and Afro-descendant filmmakers, and combines screenings with an international competition, professional meetings, training activities and industry discussions.

== History ==
The festival was founded in 2019 by the African Filmmakers Network Association (AFNETWORK), an organisation co-presided by Cameroonian producer and director Blaise Pascal Tanguy and Congolese actor and director Michael Kamuanga; Tanguy serves as the festival's general delegate.

The first edition of the festival was held in Paris in October 2019. The second edition took place from 21 to 24 October 2020 at the Cinéma Le Lincoln, in the 8th arrondissement of Paris, with actress Aïssa Maïga and actor Eriq Ebouaney serving as festival ambassadors; the official selection comprised 45 films across 11 features, 20 shorts and 14 documentaries.

The 2021 edition took place from 25 to 31 October in Paris, and included an international film competition, an African Film & TV Market, professional networking activities, training workshops and round tables.

By its fourth edition, held from 30 September to 8 October 2022 at the Cinéma Lincoln, the festival had grown substantially, receiving 985 submissions from 48 countries, of which 118 films were selected. That edition introduced "Animation" and "Films d'école" (student film) categories, launched the "Cinéma pour tous" outreach programme with the City of Paris, and established a partnership with broadcaster BFM TV for a new prize on diversity and inclusion.

The seventh edition was held from 10 to 20 December 2025 at the campus of the film school EICAR in Paris, marking a shift from the festival's earlier October dates and its traditional Champs-Élysées venue. Organised around the theme "Youth, Education... & Next Generation", the edition combined an industry market, masterclasses and discussions on artificial intelligence in filmmaking, and presented 65 selected films representing 32 African and Caribbean countries and territories, of which 30 were directed by women. The programme opened with Marie-Hélène Roux's Muganga – Celui qui soigne, a tribute to Nobel Peace Prize laureate Denis Mukwege, and closed with a screening honouring Ivorian actor and director Sidiki Bakaba. French actor and director Lucien Jean-Baptiste played a prominent role in the edition, delivering remarks at the closing ceremony.

== Programme ==
The festival's official selection has typically spanned feature-length and short fiction films, documentaries, animation, student films and television series, with entries submitted through the FilmFreeway platform. Screenings are followed by discussions between filmmakers and audiences, and the programme has also included panel discussions on topics such as European–African co-production. Since 2022, the festival has run a monthly spin-off series in partnership with the City of Paris, the "Afterworks du cinéma africain", screening African and Caribbean films free of charge in Parisian cinemas.

== Awards ==
The festival's top prizes are the Ubuntu d'Or, Ubuntu d'Argent and Ubuntu de Bronze (Golden, Silver and Bronze Ubuntu), awarded across categories including feature and short fiction, documentary, and acting performance, alongside a Jury Prize and an Audience Prize. At the 2025 edition, Sunu Yoon, directed by Jean-Marie Mallet, received the Ubuntu d'Or for feature documentary, while Lapo Chapé, directed by Mélissandre Monatus, received the Ubuntu d'Or for short documentary.

== Gallery ==
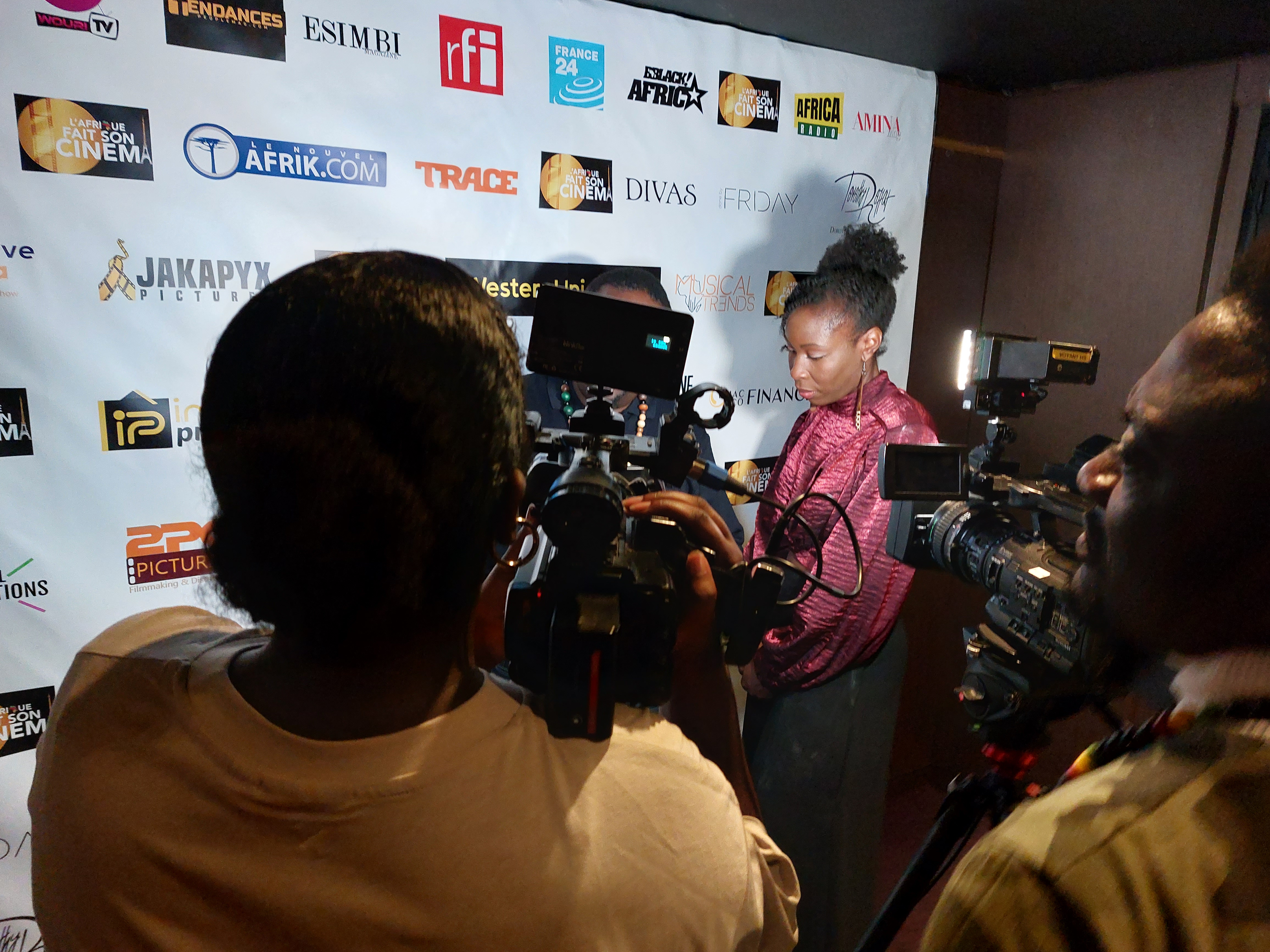

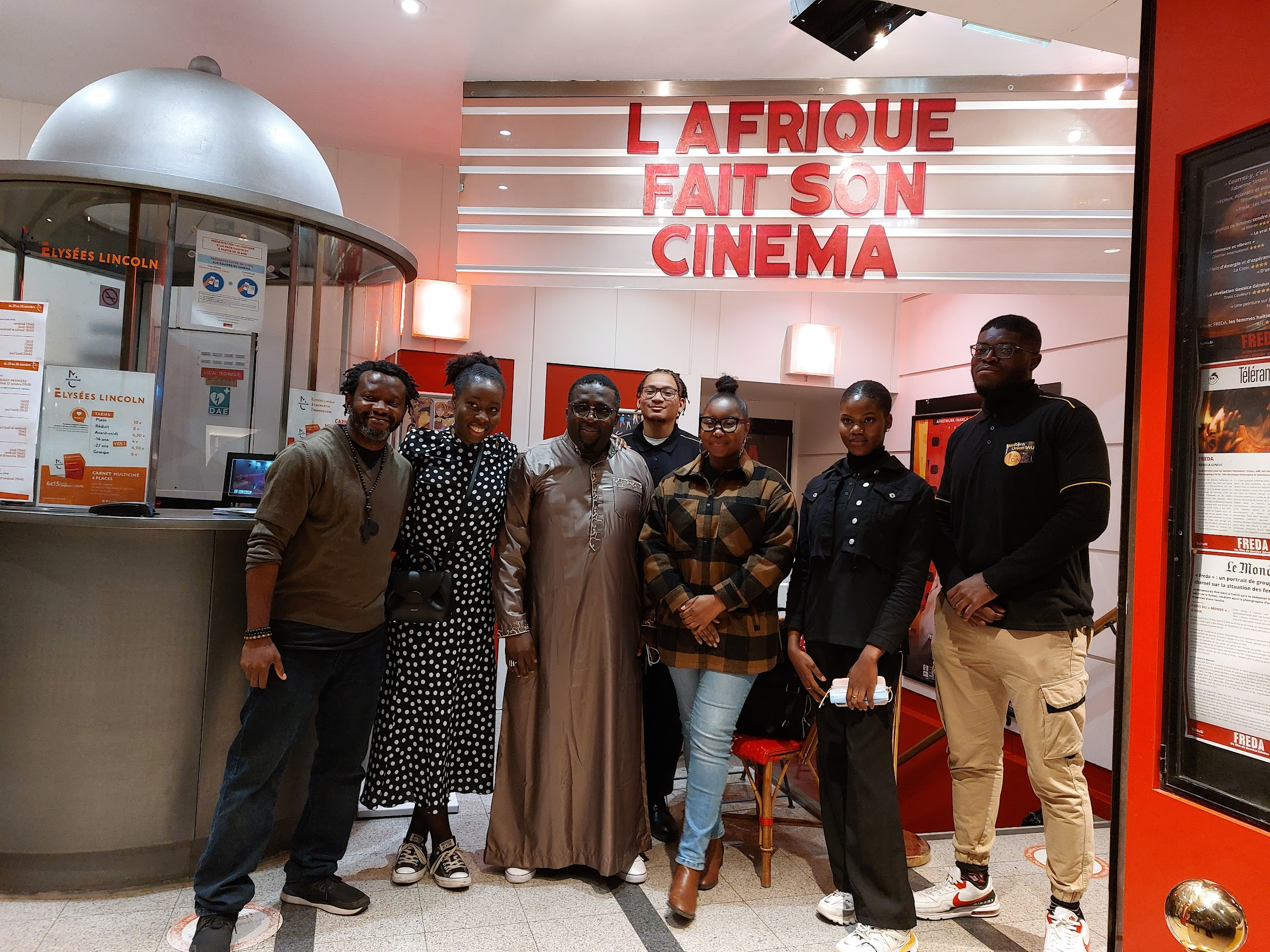

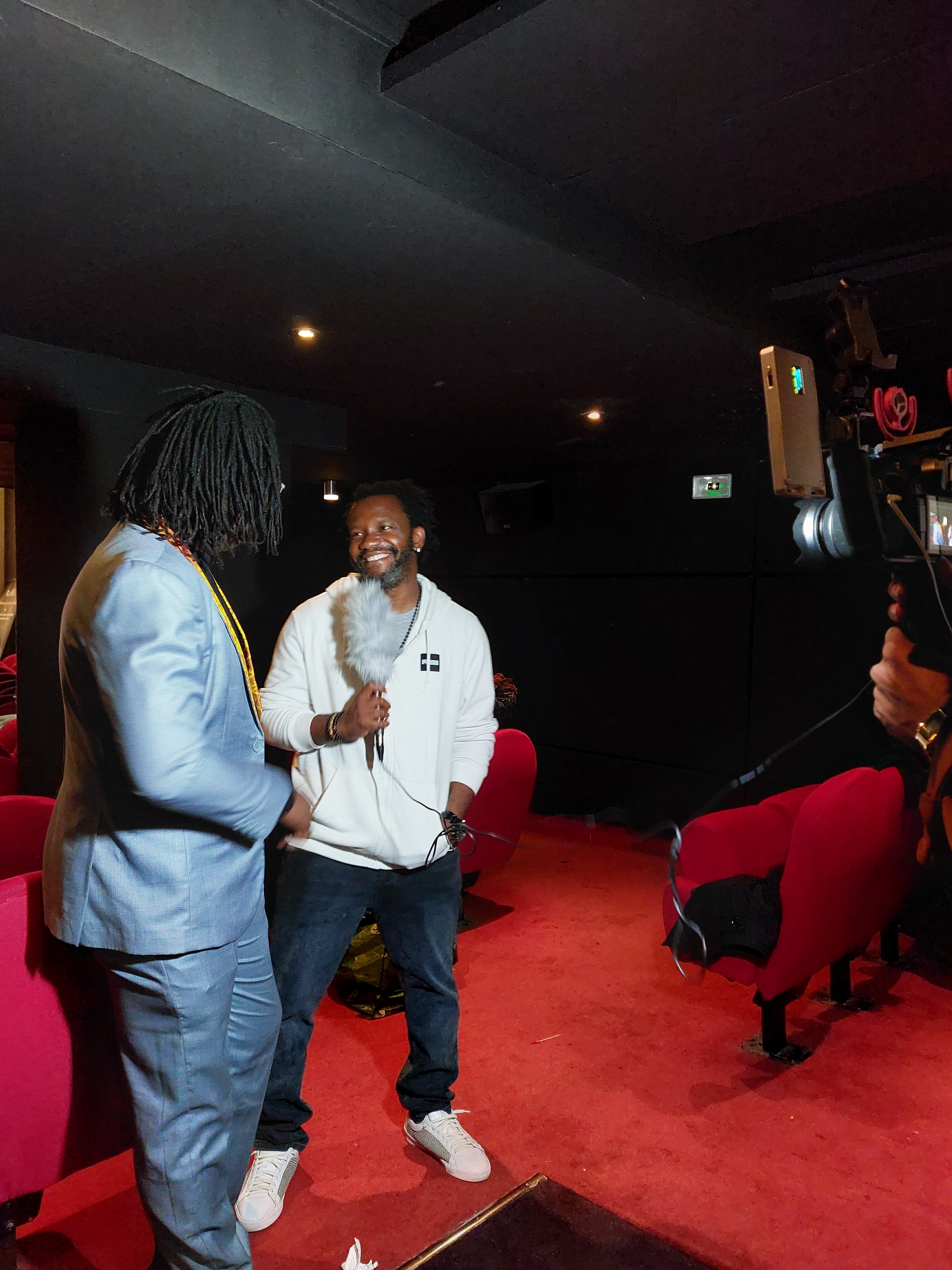

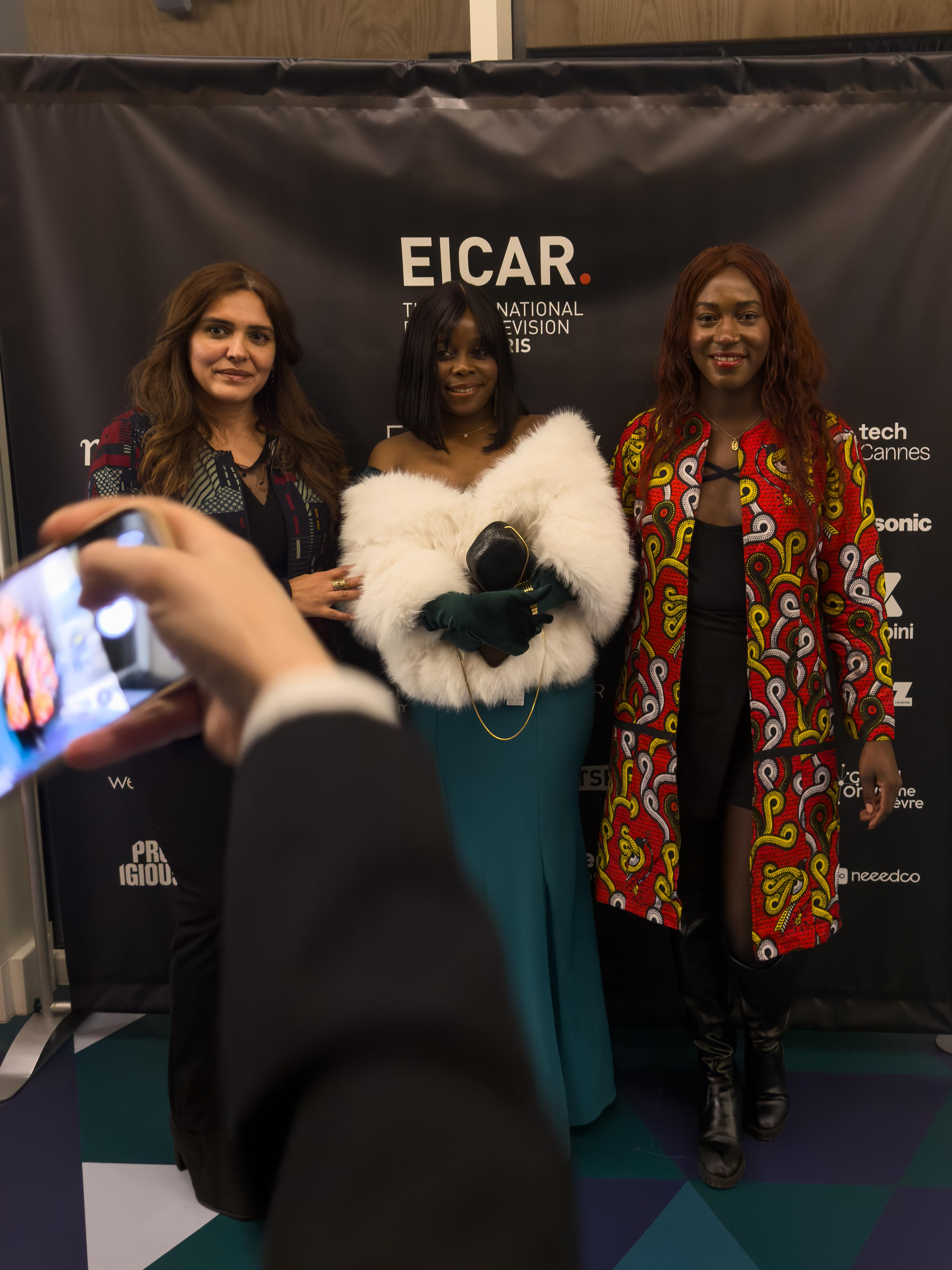

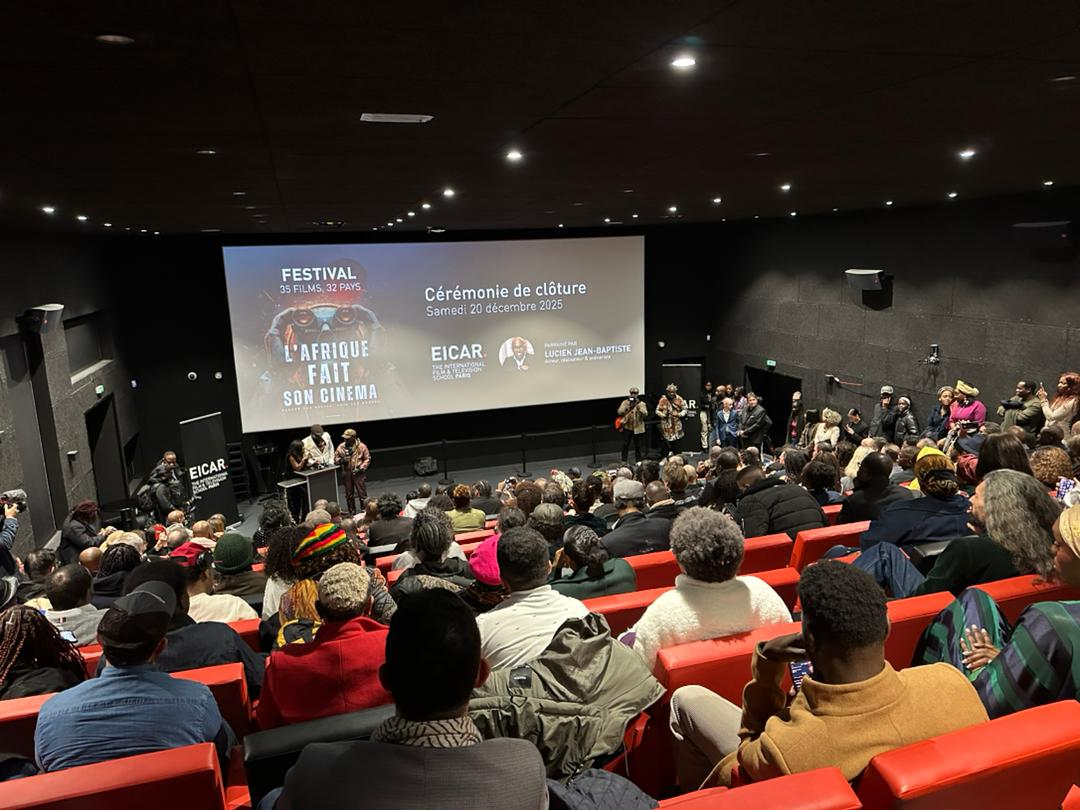

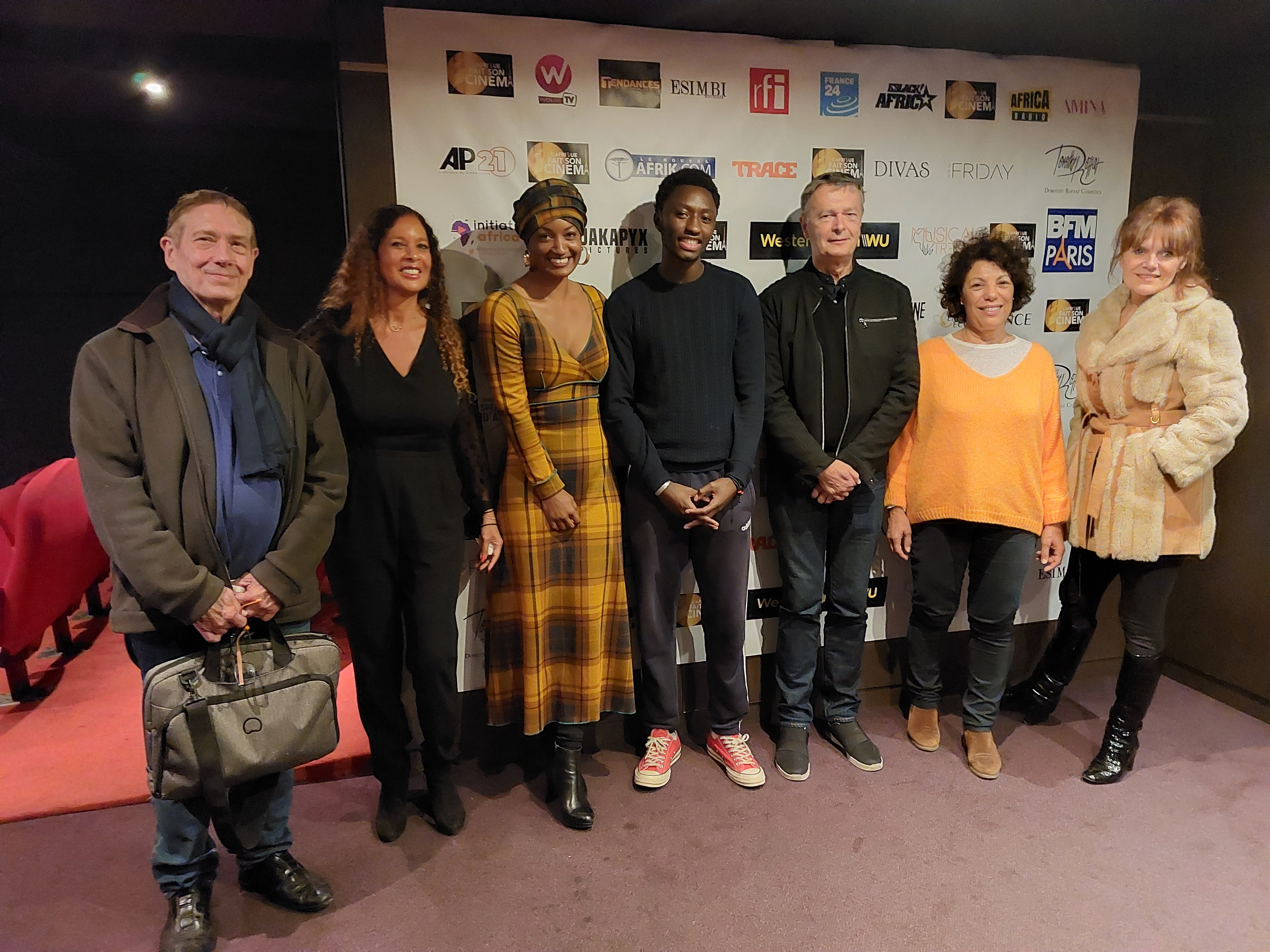

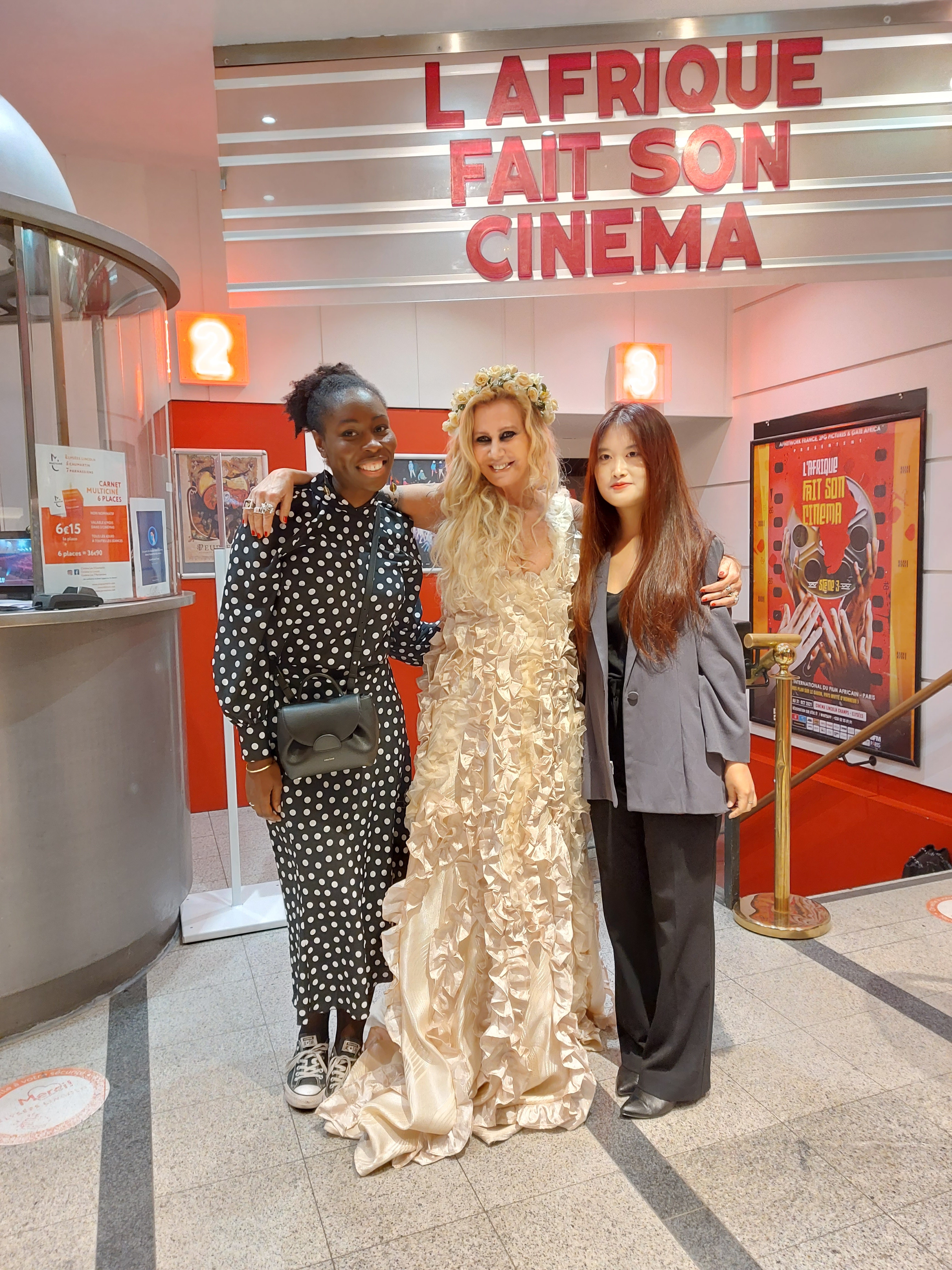

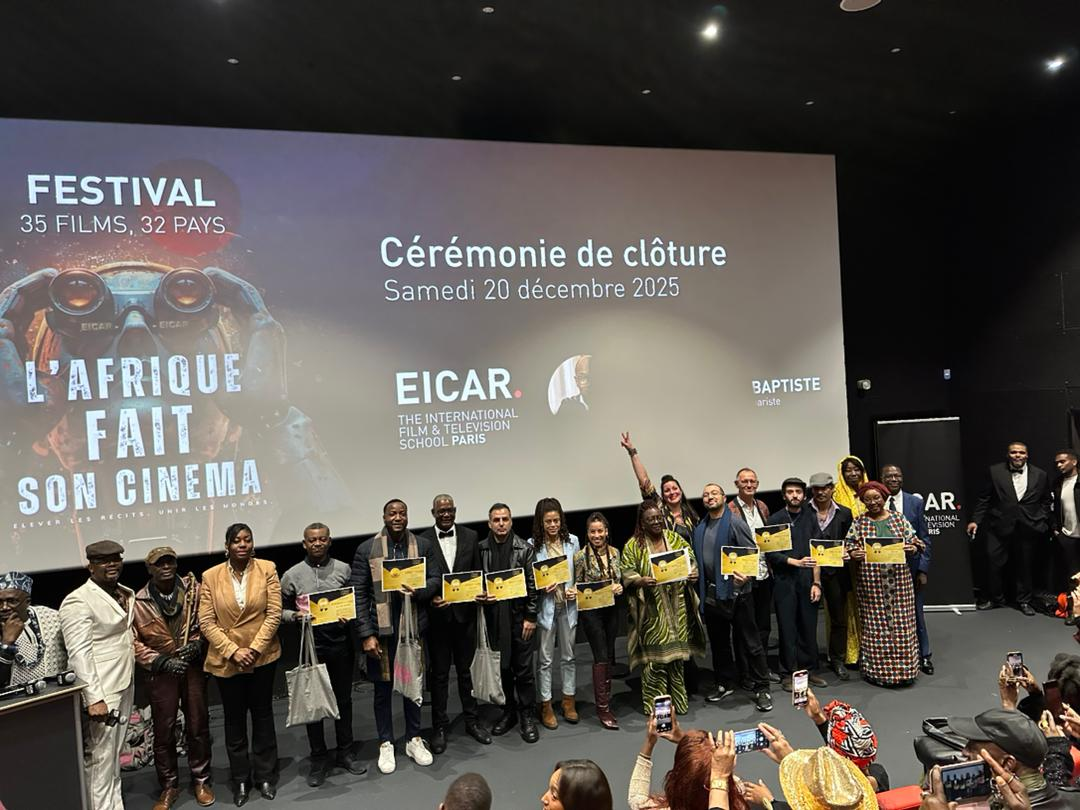

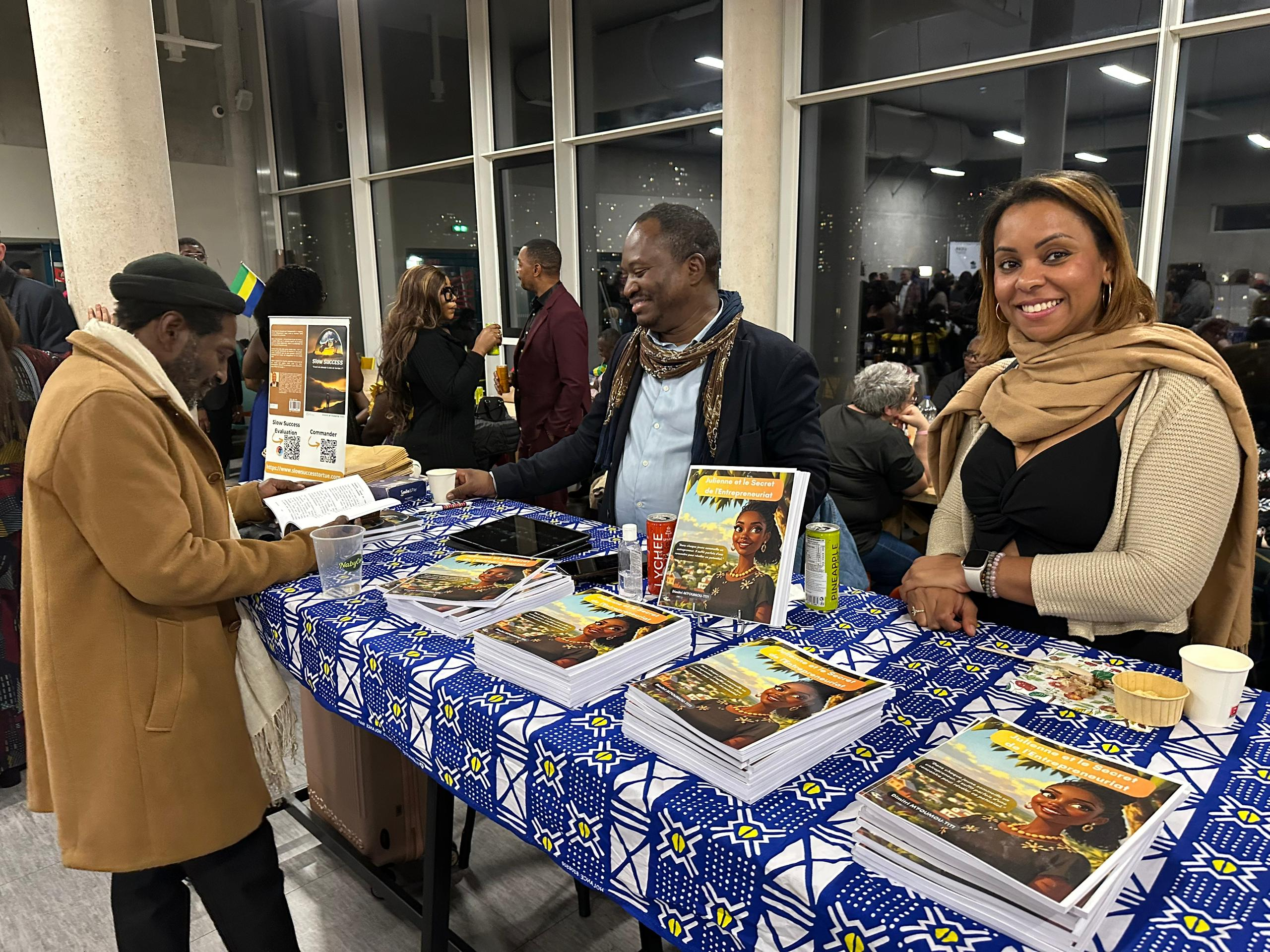

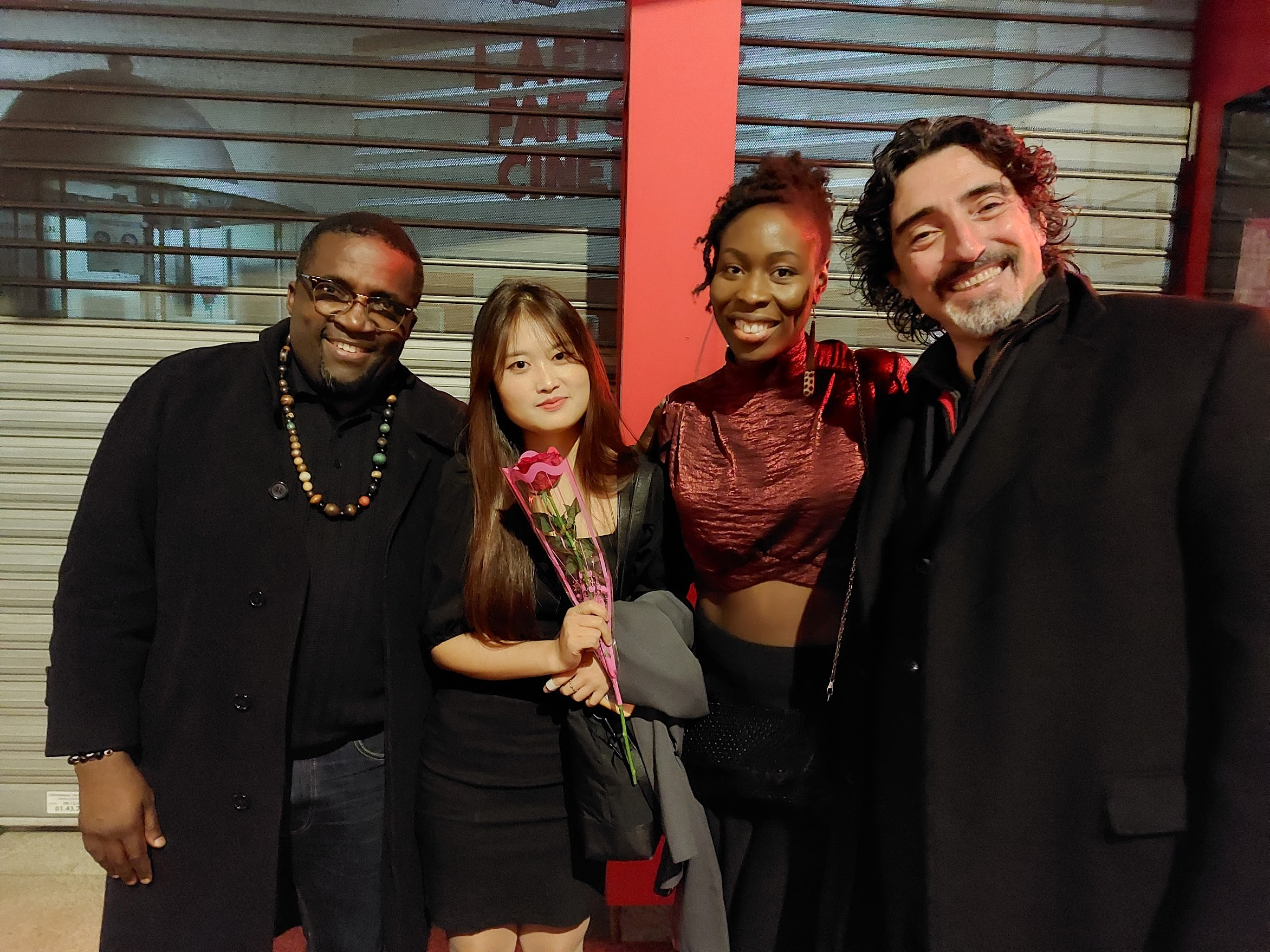

== See also ==
- African cinema
- List of African film festivals
