= Cascade Festival of African Films =

Film festival in Portland, Oregon, U.S.

- Logo
- Status: Active
- Frequency: Annually
- Location: Portland, Oregon
- Country: United States
- Inaugurated: 1991
- Website: africanfilmfestival.orgcom

The Cascade Festival of African Films is an annual film festival in Portland, Oregon, United States. Established by Portland Community College (PCC) faculty members in the 1990s, the event is the nation's longest running African film festival. According to the Portland State Vanguard, the festival was founded by Michael Dembrow, Linda Elegant, Mary Holmström, and Joseph Smith-Buani in 1991, which had four film screenings. The 2017 festival screened 17 films. The 2026 event had free screenings of approximately 20 films.

The festival is primarily held on PCC's Cascade campus. The Hollywood Theatre has screened films as part of the festival.

== See also ==
- Culture of Portland, Oregon
- List of African film festivals
- List of film festivals in the United States
