= Imedghassen Film Festival =

Annual film festival in Batna, Algeria

Imedghassen International Film Festival
- Founded: 2019
- Awards: Queen Dihya Shield
- Directors: Issam Taachit
- Language: Arabic and Tamazight
- Website: https://www.imedghassenfilmfestival.com/

The Imedghassen International Film Festival (IIFF, often stylized as iiff) is an annual international event dedicated to the celebration of cinema in the city of Batna, Algeria.

Established in 2019, this festival is organized by the El-Lemssa Cultural Cooperative, an entity accredited by the Ministry of Culture and Arts in Algeria.

The festival takes place around the month of May of every year offering a platform for filmmakers and enthusiasts to come together and showcase their talents.

IIFF serves as a noteworthy competition in various cinematographic disciplines, providing a space for filmmakers to present their works and compete for recognition. In addition to the film screenings, the festival incorporates enriching training workshops, forums, and tourism excursions.

== Name ==
The festival derives its name from the ancient Numidian mausoleum of Imedghassen, located in the vicinity of Batna, and which is recognized as the oldest royal tomb in the Maghreb. in doing so, the festival pays tribute to the Berber culture as well as the historical significance of the Aurès region.

== History ==
The inception of the Imedghassen International Film Festival (IIFF) in March 2021 was marked by controversies surrounding the festival's name. During a media conference, the festival's director revealed that they faced sponsorship offers contingent on choosing an alternative name.

=== IIFF 2021 ===
Commencing in 2021, the festival faced a sluggish start owing to COVID-19 restrictions and persistent postponements. The organizing committee accepted 26 film submissions from 15 countries.

=== IIFF 2022 ===
The second edition of the festival witnessed the participation of 29 films from 24 countries, including nations such as Turkey, China, Iran, and Egypt. Notably, the event showcased historical themes inspired by the ancient kingdom of Numidia. The Minister of Culture attended, demonstrating the support of the President of the Republic, with a dedicated budget of $100,000 allocated for the event.

=== IIFF 2023 ===
Despite an increased number of foreign guests, the third edition experienced a decline in overall statistics. The inclusion of Disney and Hollywood themes faced criticism, seen by some as an attempt at Westernization. The committee accepted 21 films from 20 countries, with Italian director Mariangela Barbanente honored as a guest in this edition.

== Growth of the festival ==
The festival serves as a platform for small-budget independent creators, yet it has also garnered attention from prominent figures in the Algerian and Arab film industry. In a social media post in November 2022, Issam Taachit, the festival director, delivered news that the city of Batna is scheduled for the construction of a 6,000-seat Zenith Theatre and Convention Centre.
