= EICAR =

EICAR may refer to:

- École Internationale de Création Audiovisuelle et de Réalisation, a film school in Paris
- European Institute for Computer Antivirus Research
  - EICAR test file
- EICAR (antiviral)
