= Rencontres cinématographies et numériques de Cotonou =

The Rencontres cinématographies et numériques de Cotonou (ReCiCo) is a Beninese film festival established in 2019.

The first edition of ReCiCo was held in September 2019. The jury for the 2019 special jury prize consisted of Jacques Béhanzin, Florisse Adjanohoun, Akambi Akala and Djaz.

== 2019 awards ==
Prize	Winner	Nominees
Grand Paulin Vieyra Prize for Best Feature Film	Desrance by Apolline Traoré	Le voyage des oubliés by Sénami Kpètèhogbé; Owo Oba, la récade de Zoundji by Roger Nahum and Samson Adjaho; Le grand tournant by Alain Déguénon and Exécute Mivékanne; Biyondo by Pierre-Claver Tossou and Prince Ogoudjobi
Best Short Film	Un air de kora by Angèle Dabiang	Batouré tem by Kocou Yémadjê; Suru by Kismath Baguiri; Colis 9 by Gildas Adamou; La trace
General Mathieu Kérékou Special Jury Prize	Le Grand tournant by Alain Déguénon	
Patrice Talon prize for Best Actress	Florisse Adjanohoun	
