= Blaise Pascal Tanguy =

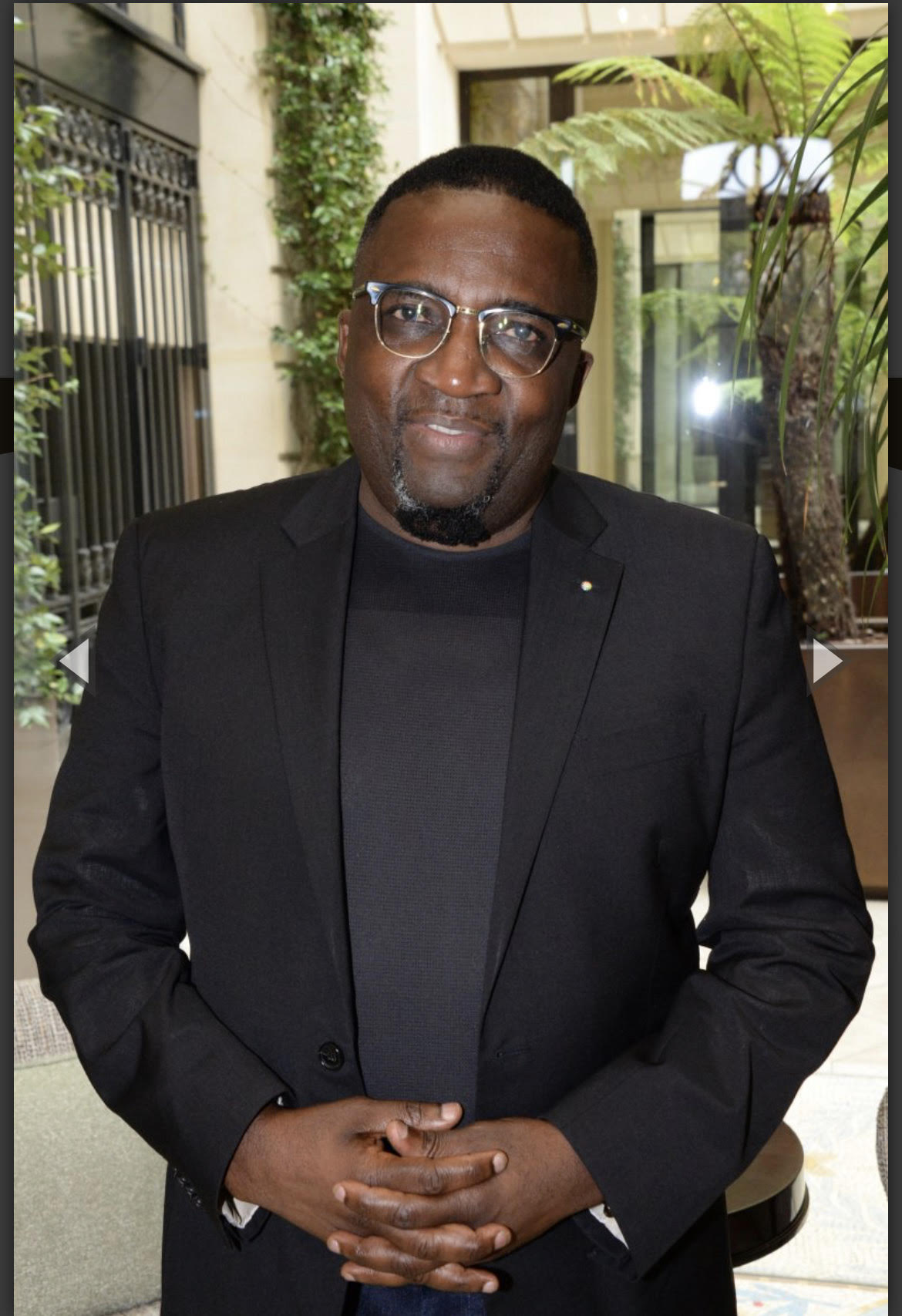
- Blaise Pascal Tanguy in 2022
- Born: 1979 (age 46–47); Bafou
- Occupations: Filmmaker, film producer, film distributor
- Years active: 2004–present
- Known for: Le tueur silencieux; Mboko ou l'enfant de la rue; L'Afrique Fait Son Cinéma.

Blaise Pascal Tanguy is a Cameroonian film director, producer, screenwriter and film distributor. Based between Douala, and Paris, he co-founded the production company 2PG Pictures and the African Filmmakers Network Association (AFNETWORK), through which he organises the Paris-based international festival L'Afrique Fait Son Cinéma. His documentary work has addressed social and economic issues in African societies, including street children, the informal economy, and the trade in counterfeit medicines.

== Early life ==
Tanguy was born in Bafou, West Region of Cameroon. He studied mathematics at the University of Yaoundé I before travelling to France to continue his education. There, he studied at the Conservatoire National des Arts et Métiers and at the Sup de Pub school, specialising in art, advertising, management and design. He also completed a filmmaking programme through online courses at a Canadian film school.

== Career ==
=== 2PG Pictures ===
In 2004, Tanguy co-founded the production company 2PG Pictures with two other film professionals. Based in Douala, the company has produced and distributed documentaries and fiction films depicting everyday life in Cameroon and, more broadly, in sub-Saharan Africa.

=== Documentary and fiction filmmaking ===
Tanguy's early credits include the documentary series Afrique, les métiers de la rue (2006) and the fiction feature Clandos (2007), followed by the short fiction films Impulsions and Oser ou s'exposer (both 2008). He was also co-producer of the 2006 documentary Afrique, une économie en sursis (Africa, a Would-Be Economy), directed by Sébastien Tézé, which examined economic precarity in Africa.

He gained recognition for Le tueur silencieux (The Silent Killer, 2011), which he directed and produced. The documentary examined the trade in counterfeit and unregulated medicines sold outside official pharmaceutical channels in Cameroon and was broadcast on France Télévisions, Canal2International and other channels. The film is held in the catalogue of the Bibliothèque nationale de France. In 2012, he directed Mboko ou l'enfant de la rue, a documentary about street children in Yaoundé, which was selected for competition at the Ecrans Noirs festival.

=== Television ===
In the mid-2010s, Tanguy co-created, wrote and produced Kamerage, a political thriller television series centred on the investigation into the murder of a government minister. He also produced the 2019 short film Talitha Koumi, which received the award for best short film at the L'Afrique Fait Son Cinéma festival that year. Since the 2010s, he has focused increasingly on the international distribution of African and Afro-descendant films.

=== AFNETWORK ===
Tanguy co-founded AFNETWORK in Paris in 2017, together with Congolese actor and director Michael Kamuanga; the two serve as co-presidents of the association, which promotes African and Afro-descendant cinema through training sessions, seminars and public screenings. Under AFNETWORK, they launched the annual festival L'Afrique Fait Son Cinéma, whose first edition was held in Paris in October 2019; Tanguy serves as the festival's general delegate.

The festival is held annually in Paris and presents fiction features, short films, documentaries, animation and student films from across Africa and the Caribbean, alongside professional networking events. Its seventh edition, held at EICAR Paris from 10 to 20 December 2025, presented 65 selected films representing 32 African and Caribbean countries and territories, of which 30 were directed by women.

=== Other activities ===
He is additionally the publisher of several digital magazines, including CEMAC-ECO.FINANCE, Tendances People Mag, Musical Trends Africa and Solid Actions, which cover African economic, cultural and social topics.

== Filmography ==
Year	Title	Role	Notes
2006	Afrique, les métiers de la rue	Director	Documentary series
2006	Afrique, une économie en sursis (Africa, a Would-Be Economy)	Co-producer	Directed by Sébastien Tézé
2007	Clandos	Director	Fiction feature
2008	Impulsions	Director	Fiction short
2008	Oser ou s'exposer	Director	Fiction short
2011	Le tueur silencieux (The Silent Killer)	Director, producer	Documentary
2012	Mboko ou l'enfant de la rue	Director	Documentary
2016–2019	Kamerage	Producer, writer, co-creator	Television series
2019	Talitha Koumi	Producer	Short film; won best short film, AFSC festival 2019
