= Love Unto Grave (TV series) =

Ethiopian television drama series

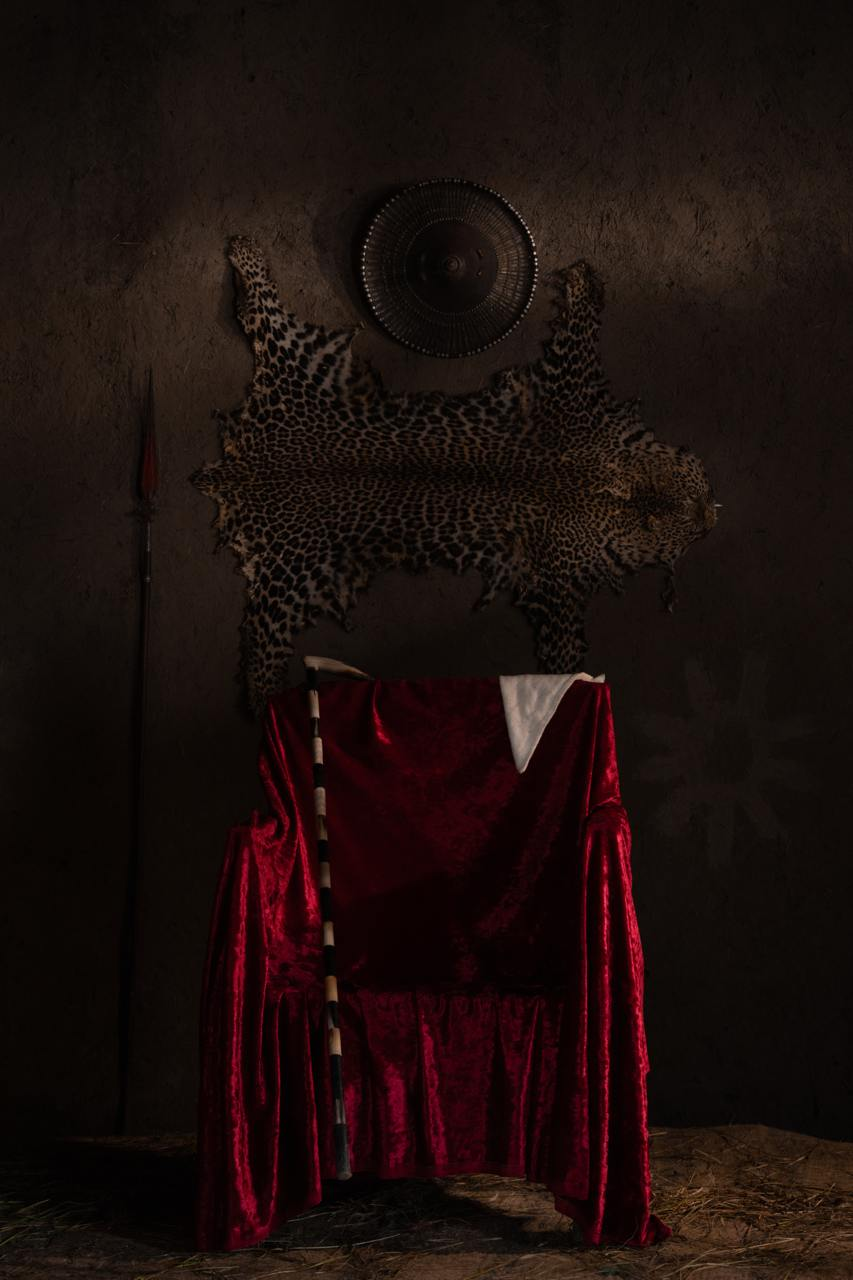
- Original poster for the TV series
- Genre: Drama
- Based on: Love to the Grave by Haddis Alemayehu
- Written by: Aklilu Gebremedhin; Melkamu Haile; Tseday Wondimu; Sewmehon Yismaw
- Directed by: Sewmehon Yismaw
- Starring: Mehari Molla; Mekdes Degaderege; Meskerem Nega; Gizachew Aderaw; Hiruy Demelash; Etsegenet Aseged
- Country of origin: Ethiopia
- Original language: Amharic
- No. of seasons: 4
- No. of episodes: 48

Production
- Producers: Yonas Abraham; Akele Melese; Sewmehon Yismaw; Abebe Balcha
- Cinematography: Fishatsion Nibret
- Running time: 45 minutes
- Production company: SewMehon Films
- Budget: 41,427,600 birr

Original release
- Network: EBC
- Release: 11 September 2024 – present

Love Unto Grave (Amharic: ፍቅር እስከ መቃብር; Fikir Eske Mekabir) is an Ethiopian television drama series written by Aklilu Gebremedhin, Melkamu Haile, Tseday Wondimu, Sewmehon Yismaw and directed by the latter. Produced by SewMehon Films, it is based on the 1968 novel of the same name by Haddis Alemayehu, broadcast on the Ethiopian Broadcasting Corporation (EBC) in the coincidence of Ethiopian New Year since 11 September 2024. It stars with Mehari Molla, Mekdes Degaderege, Meskerem Nega, Gizachew Aderaw, Hiruy Demelash and Etsegenet Aseged.

== Background ==
Love Unto Grave consists of four seasons, a total of 48 episodes that approximately run 45 minutes long. Started its production in 2023, SewMehon Films agreed to broadcast 12 episodes within five months since its premiere with the remaining episodes expected for completion in the next nine months. The production was budgeted at 41,427,600 birr, with 863,075 birr allocated per episode. During production deal ceremony at new EBC Media Complex, it was told that the series would emphasize the original Haddis' work narratives, noting the Ethiopian literature. Love Unto Grave is targeted for older generation that yearns its adaptation from novel to television medium.

== Legal dispute ==
On 18 September, the series was halted its broadcast following lawsuit brought by individuals – who claimed they are descent of Haddis – to the Federal First Instance Court, alleging it infringed copyright. EBC stated they acquired the right of broadcasting from Walta Media and Communication, the official copyright holder. On 19 November, the ban was lifted.
