= Assefa Gebre-Mariam Tessema =

Ethiopian poet and academic (born 1936)

Assefa Gebre-Mariam Tessema (also spelt Gebremariam, Tesema; born 1936) is an Ethiopian poet and academic. He wrote the national anthem of Ethiopia from 1975 to 1992, Ethiopia, Ethiopia, Ethiopia be first. As of 2016, he was working as a teacher in Kaffa Province.

== Biography ==
Assefa studied philosophy and literature at the University of Addis Ababa. He taught Amharic language and literature at Leningrad University for four years before continuing his education in Addis Ababa and Edinburgh. He was a founder of the Ethiopian Writers' Association and has served as its secretary general since 1978.

In 1986, Assefa was serving as the director of the Academy of Ethiopian Languages in Addis Ababa. In 1996, he was part of a panel that worked on an Amharic science and technology dictionary published by the academy. Together with two mathematicians, Tessema served as the linguist for the mathematics terminology.

On 8 September 2007, Assefa, who was based in Las Vegas, Nevada, at the time, gave a talk at Howard University, Washington D.C., on Ethiopian history, language and culture in the past millennium. In October 2009, Assefa helped organise a birthday anniversary memorial service at the university for Ethiopian poet and politician Haddis Alemayehu, who had died in 2003.

== Bibliography ==
- Hope
- The Rays of September (1979)
- The Voice (1980)

== See also ==
- Daniel Yohannes Haggos, the composer of the national anthem of Ethiopia from 1975 to 1992
