= Ethiopia, Ethiopia, Ethiopia be first =

1975–1992 national anthem of Ethiopia

ኢትዮጵያ ኢትዮጵያ ኢትዮጵያ ቅደሚ
English: Ethiopia, Ethiopia, Ethiopia be first
- Ītyoṗya, Ītyoṗya, Ītyoṗya, qidämī
- National anthem of Ethiopia
- Lyrics: Assefa Gebre-Mariam Tesema
- Music: Daniel Yohannes Haggos
- Adopted: 21 March 1975
- Relinquished: 1992
- Preceded by: Ethiopia, Be Happy
- Succeeded by: March Forward, Dear Mother Ethiopia

Audio sample
- Ethiopia, Ethiopia, Ethiopia be first: file; help

Ītyoṗya, Ītyoṗya, Ītyoṗya, qidämī (Amharic: ኢትዮጵያ ፣ ኢትዮጵያ ፣ ኢትዮጵያ ፣ ቅደሚ, "Ethiopia, Ethiopia, Ethiopia be first") was the former national anthem of Ethiopia from 1975 to 1992, during the Derg military junta of Mengistu Haile Mariam. The anthem was first performed on Revolution Day on 12 September 1975. (Note: The source has the mistaken date of 1 September for Revolution Day.) When the junta was reorganized in 1987 as the People's Democratic Republic of Ethiopia, the song was retained until 1992. The lyrics were written by poet Assefa Gebre-Mariam Tesema, and the music was composed by musician Daniel Yohannes Haggos.

== Lyrics ==
Amharic

ኢትዮጵያ ፡ ኢትዮጵያ ፡ ኢትዮጵያ ፡ ቅደሚ ፣
በኅብረሰባዊነት ፡ አብቢ ፡ ለምልሚ!
ቃል ፡ ኪዳን ፡ ገብተዋል ፡ ጀግኖች ፡ ልጆችሽ ፣
ወንዞች ፡ ተራሮችሽ ፣ ድንግል ፡ መሬትሽ ፣
ለኢትዮጵያ ፡ አንድነት ፡ ለነጻነትሽ ፣
መሥዋዕት ፡ ሊኾኑ ፡ ለክብር ፡ ለዝናሽ ።
ተራመጂ ፡ ወደፊት ፡ በጥበብ ፡ ጎዳና ፣
ታጠቂ ፡ ለሥራ ፡ ላገር ፡ ብልጽግና ።
የዠግኖች ፡ እናት ፡ ነሽ ፡ በልጆችሽ ፡ ኵሪ ፣
ጠላቶችሽ ፡ ይጥፉ ፡ ለዘላለም ፡ ኑሪ!

Transliteration

Ītyoṗya, Ītyoṗya, Ītyoṗya, qidämī
bähibräsäbawīnnät, abbibī, lämlimī!
Qal kīdan gäbtäwal jägnotch lijotchishi,
wänzotch tärarotchish dingil märetishi
läĪtyoṗya andinnät länäşannätishi
mäswait līhonu läkibir läzinnashi.
Täramäji wädäfit bäṭibäbi godanna.
Taṭäqī läsira lagär biliṣiginna!
Yäjägnotch innat näsh, bälijotchish kurī.
Ṭälatotchish yiṭfu, läzälaläm nurī!

IPA transcription (Note: See Help:IPA/Amharic and Amharic § Phonology.)

[i.tjo.p’ja i.tjo.p’ja i.tjo.p’ja kʼɨ.də.mi]
[bəh.bɾə.sə.βa.win.nət ab.bɨ.βi ləm.lɨ.mi ǁ]
[kʼal ki.dan gəb.tə.wal d͡ʒəg.not͡ʃ lɨ.d͡ʒo.t͡ʃɨ.ʃɨ]
[wən.zot͡ʃ tə.ɾa.ɾo.t͡ʃɨʃ | dɨn.gɨl mə.ɾe.tɨ.ʃɨ |]
[ləi̯.tjo.p’ja an.dɨn.nət lə.nə.t͡s’an.nə.tɨ.ʃɨ |]
[məs.wa.ʔɨt li.ho.nu lək.bɨɾ lə.zɨn.na.ʃɨ ǁ]
[tə.ɾa.məd͡ʒ wɔ.də.fit bə.tʼɨ.βəb go.dan.na |]
[ta.tʼə.kʼi lə.sɨ.ɾa la.gəɾ bɨl.t͡s’ɨ.gɨn.na ǁ]
[jə.ʒəg.not͡ʃ ɨn.nat nəʃ bə.lɨ.d͡ʒo.t͡ʃɨʃ kʷʊ.ɾi |]
[tʼə.la.to.t͡ʃɨʃ jɨtʼ.fu lə.zə.la.ləm nu.ɾi ǁ]

English translation

Ethiopia, Ethiopia – Ethiopia, be first
In socialism – flourish, be fertile!
Your brave sons have made a covenant,
That your rivers and mountains, your virgin land
Should be a sacrifice for the unity of Ethiopia, for your freedom,
To your honour and renown!
Strive forwards on the road of wisdom,
Gird yourself for the task, for the prosperity of the land.
You are the mother of heroes – be proud of your sons,
May your enemies perish – may you live forever!

== See also ==
- March Forward, Dear Mother Ethiopia, the current national anthem
