= Ethiopia, Be Happy =

1930–1975 national anthem of Ethiopia

ኢትዮጵያ ሆይ ደስ ይበልሽ
English: Ethiopia, Be Happy
- Ethiopia hoy des ybelish
- National anthem of the Ethiopian Empire
- Lyrics: Yoftahe Nigussie
- Music: Kevork Nalbandian
- Adopted: 1930 (original lyrics)
- Readopted: 1974 (without lyrics)
- Relinquished: 1974 (with lyrics); 1975 (music only)
- Succeeded by: Ethiopia, Ethiopia, Ethiopia be first

Audio sample
- Ethiopia, Be Happy: file; help

"Ethiopia, Be Happy" (Amharic: ኢትዮጵያ ሆይ ደስ ይበልሽ, romanized: Ethiopia hoy des ybelish) was the national anthem of the Ethiopian Empire during the rule of Emperor Haile Selassie I. Composed by Kevork Nalbandian in 1926, the anthem was first performed during the coronation of the Emperor on 2 November 1930. It remained the national anthem until the Emperor was overthrown by the Derg regime in 1974 and was relinquished the next year.

== Lyrics ==
ኢትዮጵያ ሆይ ደስ ይበልሽ
(Amharic)

ኢትዮጵያ ፡ ሆይ ፡ ደስ ፡ ይበልሽ ፣
በአምላክሽ ፡ ኃይል ፡ በንጉሥሽ ።
ተባብረዋል ፡ አርበኞችሽ ፤
አይነካም ፡ ከቶ ፡ ነጻነትሽ ፣
𝄆 ብርቱ ፡ ናቸውና ፡ ተራሮችሽ ፣
አትፈሪም ፡ ከጠላቶችሽ ።
ድል ፡ አድራጊው ፡ ንጉሳችን ፣
ይኑርልን ፡ ለክብራችን ። 𝄇

Ethiopia hoy des ybelish
(transliteration)

Itəyop̣ya hoy des ybeləš
Beämlakəš ḫayəl benguśəš
Tebabəräwal arbäñočəš
Äynekam keto neṣanetəš
𝄆 Bərtu načewna terarəčəš
Ätəferim keṭelatočəš
Dəl adragiw ngusačən
Ynurələn lekəbračən 𝄇

Ethiopia, Be Happy
(English translation)

Ethiopia, be happy
thanks to the power of God and your ruler.
Your brave citizens are unanimous;
your freedom will never be touched,
𝄆 As your mountains are defiant
and your natives do not fear any enemy.
Long live our victorious ruler
to the glory of our country. 𝄇
