= Imperial Academy =

Imperial Academy may refer to:

- The Imperial Academy of Arts in St Petersburg
- The Russian Academy of Sciences in Moscow (old name)
- The former Imperial Military Academy in St Petersburg
- The Imperial Academy of Arts in Vienna, now the Academy of Fine Arts Vienna
- The Imperial Academy of Music in Vienna, now the University of Music and Performing Arts, Vienna
- The Imperial Academy of Sciences in Vienna, now the Austrian Academy of Sciences
- The former Imperial Iranian Academy of Philosophy, in Tehran
- The former Imperial Academy of Letters, Arts, and Sciences of Ethiopia, in Addis Ababa
- The Taixue, the highest institution of learning in Han dynasty China
- The Guozijian, the highest institution of learning in China from the Sui dynasty to the Qing dynasty
  - Guozijian (Beijing)
- The Hanlin Academy in Imperial China
- The fictional Imperial Academy in the Star Wars series
- Imperial Ballet Academy
- Imperial Military Academy
- Imperial Academy, Huế, in the old capital city Huế was the national academy during the Nguyễn Dynasty in Vietnam
