= Ethiopic (Unicode block) =

- Range: U+1200..U+137F (384 code points)
- Plane: BMP
- Scripts: Ethiopic
- Major alphabets: Geʽez
- Assigned: 358 code points
- Unused: 26 reserved code points

Unicode Version History
- 3.0 (1999): 345 (+345)
- 4.1 (2005): 356 (+11)
- 6.0 (2010): 358 (+2)

Unicode documentation
- Code chart ∣ Web page

Ethiopic is a Unicode block containing characters for writing the Geʽez script, used for Geʽez, Tigrinya, Amharic, Tigre, Harari, Gurage and other Ethiosemitic languages and Central Cushitic languages or Agaw languages.

== Block ==
Ethiopic^{[1]}^{[2]} Official Unicode Consortium code chart (PDF)
	0	1	2	3	4	5	6	7	8	9	A	B	C	D	E	F
U+120x	ሀ	ሁ	ሂ	ሃ	ሄ	ህ	ሆ	ሇ	ለ	ሉ	ሊ	ላ	ሌ	ል	ሎ	ሏ
U+121x	ሐ	ሑ	ሒ	ሓ	ሔ	ሕ	ሖ	ሗ	መ	ሙ	ሚ	ማ	ሜ	ም	ሞ	ሟ
U+122x	ሠ	ሡ	ሢ	ሣ	ሤ	ሥ	ሦ	ሧ	ረ	ሩ	ሪ	ራ	ሬ	ር	ሮ	ሯ
U+123x	ሰ	ሱ	ሲ	ሳ	ሴ	ስ	ሶ	ሷ	ሸ	ሹ	ሺ	ሻ	ሼ	ሽ	ሾ	ሿ
U+124x	ቀ	ቁ	ቂ	ቃ	ቄ	ቅ	ቆ	ቇ	ቈ		ቊ	ቋ	ቌ	ቍ		
U+125x	ቐ	ቑ	ቒ	ቓ	ቔ	ቕ	ቖ		ቘ		ቚ	ቛ	ቜ	ቝ		
U+126x	በ	ቡ	ቢ	ባ	ቤ	ብ	ቦ	ቧ	ቨ	ቩ	ቪ	ቫ	ቬ	ቭ	ቮ	ቯ
U+127x	ተ	ቱ	ቲ	ታ	ቴ	ት	ቶ	ቷ	ቸ	ቹ	ቺ	ቻ	ቼ	ች	ቾ	ቿ
U+128x	ኀ	ኁ	ኂ	ኃ	ኄ	ኅ	ኆ	ኇ	ኈ		ኊ	ኋ	ኌ	ኍ		
U+129x	ነ	ኑ	ኒ	ና	ኔ	ን	ኖ	ኗ	ኘ	ኙ	ኚ	ኛ	ኜ	ኝ	ኞ	ኟ
U+12Ax	አ	ኡ	ኢ	ኣ	ኤ	እ	ኦ	ኧ	ከ	ኩ	ኪ	ካ	ኬ	ክ	ኮ	ኯ
U+12Bx	ኰ		ኲ	ኳ	ኴ	ኵ			ኸ	ኹ	ኺ	ኻ	ኼ	ኽ	ኾ	
U+12Cx	ዀ		ዂ	ዃ	ዄ	ዅ			ወ	ዉ	ዊ	ዋ	ዌ	ው	ዎ	ዏ
U+12Dx	ዐ	ዑ	ዒ	ዓ	ዔ	ዕ	ዖ		ዘ	ዙ	ዚ	ዛ	ዜ	ዝ	ዞ	ዟ
U+12Ex	ዠ	ዡ	ዢ	ዣ	ዤ	ዥ	ዦ	ዧ	የ	ዩ	ዪ	ያ	ዬ	ይ	ዮ	ዯ
U+12Fx	ደ	ዱ	ዲ	ዳ	ዴ	ድ	ዶ	ዷ	ዸ	ዹ	ዺ	ዻ	ዼ	ዽ	ዾ	ዿ
U+130x	ጀ	ጁ	ጂ	ጃ	ጄ	ጅ	ጆ	ጇ	ገ	ጉ	ጊ	ጋ	ጌ	ግ	ጎ	ጏ
U+131x	ጐ		ጒ	ጓ	ጔ	ጕ			ጘ	ጙ	ጚ	ጛ	ጜ	ጝ	ጞ	ጟ
U+132x	ጠ	ጡ	ጢ	ጣ	ጤ	ጥ	ጦ	ጧ	ጨ	ጩ	ጪ	ጫ	ጬ	ጭ	ጮ	ጯ
U+133x	ጰ	ጱ	ጲ	ጳ	ጴ	ጵ	ጶ	ጷ	ጸ	ጹ	ጺ	ጻ	ጼ	ጽ	ጾ	ጿ
U+134x	ፀ	ፁ	ፂ	ፃ	ፄ	ፅ	ፆ	ፇ	ፈ	ፉ	ፊ	ፋ	ፌ	ፍ	ፎ	ፏ
U+135x	ፐ	ፑ	ፒ	ፓ	ፔ	ፕ	ፖ	ፗ	ፘ	ፙ	ፚ			፝	፞	፟
U+136x	፠	፡	።	፣	፤	፥	፦	፧	፨	፩	፪	፫	፬	፭	፮	፯
U+137x	፰	፱	፲	፳	፴	፵	፶	፷	፸	፹	፺	፻	፼			
Notes 1.As of Unicode version 18.0 2.Grey areas indicate non-assigned code points

== History ==
The following Unicode-related documents record the purpose and process of defining specific characters in the Ethiopic block:

Version	Final code points (Note: Proposed code points and characters names may differ from final code points and names)	Count	UTC ID	L2 ID	WG2 ID	Document
3.0	U+1200..1206, 1208..1246, 1248, 124A..124D, 1250..1256, 1258, 125A..125D, 1260..1286, 1288, 128A..128D, 1290..12AE, 12B0, 12B2..12B5, 12B8..12BE, 12C0, 12C2..12C5, 12C8..12CE, 12D0..12D6, 12D8..12EE, 12F0..130E, 1310, 1312..1315, 1318..131E, 1320..1346, 1348..135A, 1361..137C	345	UTC/1991-043			Becker, Joe, Ethiopian
3.0	U+1200..1206, 1208..1246, 1248, 124A..124D, 1250..1256, 1258, 125A..125D, 1260..1286, 1288, 128A..128D, 1290..12AE, 12B0, 12B2..12B5, 12B8..12BE, 12C0, 12C2..12C5, 12C8..12CE, 12D0..12D6, 12D8..12EE, 12F0..130E, 1310, 1312..1315, 1318..131E, 1320..1346, 1348..135A, 1361..137C	345		X3L2/92-143	N807	Mann, Michael; Ross, Hugh McGregor (1992-05-14), Comments on Ethiopian Script
3.0	U+1200..1206, 1208..1246, 1248, 124A..124D, 1250..1256, 1258, 125A..125D, 1260..1286, 1288, 128A..128D, 1290..12AE, 12B0, 12B2..12B5, 12B8..12BE, 12C0, 12C2..12C5, 12C8..12CE, 12D0..12D6, 12D8..12EE, 12F0..130E, 1310, 1312..1315, 1318..131E, 1320..1346, 1348..135A, 1361..137C	345	UTC/1995-013			Becker, Joe (1995-02-26), Proposal for Ethiopian Encoding in Unicode/10646
3.0	U+1200..1206, 1208..1246, 1248, 124A..124D, 1250..1256, 1258, 125A..125D, 1260..1286, 1288, 128A..128D, 1290..12AE, 12B0, 12B2..12B5, 12B8..12BE, 12C0, 12C2..12C5, 12C8..12CE, 12D0..12D6, 12D8..12EE, 12F0..130E, 1310, 1312..1315, 1318..131E, 1320..1346, 1348..135A, 1361..137C	345			N1165	Everson, Michael (1995-03-11), Names of Ethiopian characters
3.0	U+1200..1206, 1208..1246, 1248, 124A..124D, 1250..1256, 1258, 125A..125D, 1260..1286, 1288, 128A..128D, 1290..12AE, 12B0, 12B2..12B5, 12B8..12BE, 12C0, 12C2..12C5, 12C8..12CE, 12D0..12D6, 12D8..12EE, 12F0..130E, 1310, 1312..1315, 1318..131E, 1320..1346, 1348..135A, 1361..137C	345	UTC/1995-055b			Yacob, Daniel (1995-10-06), Ethiopic Glyphs Variants
3.0	U+1200..1206, 1208..1246, 1248, 124A..124D, 1250..1256, 1258, 125A..125D, 1260..1286, 1288, 128A..128D, 1290..12AE, 12B0, 12B2..12B5, 12B8..12BE, 12C0, 12C2..12C5, 12C8..12CE, 12D0..12D6, 12D8..12EE, 12F0..130E, 1310, 1312..1315, 1318..131E, 1320..1346, 1348..135A, 1361..137C	345		X3L2/95-116	N1270	Ross, Hugh McGregor (1995-10-12), Proposal for Inclusion of Ethiopian-Eritrean Syllabary
3.0	U+1200..1206, 1208..1246, 1248, 124A..124D, 1250..1256, 1258, 125A..125D, 1260..1286, 1288, 128A..128D, 1290..12AE, 12B0, 12B2..12B5, 12B8..12BE, 12C0, 12C2..12C5, 12C8..12CE, 12D0..12D6, 12D8..12EE, 12F0..130E, 1310, 1312..1315, 1318..131E, 1320..1346, 1348..135A, 1361..137C	345	UTC/1995-055a	X3L2/95-134	N1326	Becker, Joe (1995-12-07), Conclusive Proposal for Encoding of Ethiopic Syllabary
3.0	U+1200..1206, 1208..1246, 1248, 124A..124D, 1250..1256, 1258, 125A..125D, 1260..1286, 1288, 128A..128D, 1290..12AE, 12B0, 12B2..12B5, 12B8..12BE, 12C0, 12C2..12C5, 12C8..12CE, 12D0..12D6, 12D8..12EE, 12F0..130E, 1310, 1312..1315, 1318..131E, 1320..1346, 1348..135A, 1361..137C	345	UTC/1996-002			Aliprand, Joan; Hart, Edwin; Greenfield, Steve (1996-03-05), "Ethiopic", UTC #67 Minutes
3.0	U+1200..1206, 1208..1246, 1248, 124A..124D, 1250..1256, 1258, 125A..125D, 1260..1286, 1288, 128A..128D, 1290..12AE, 12B0, 12B2..12B5, 12B8..12BE, 12C0, 12C2..12C5, 12C8..12CE, 12D0..12D6, 12D8..12EE, 12F0..130E, 1310, 1312..1315, 1318..131E, 1320..1346, 1348..135A, 1361..137C	345			N1372	Ross, Hugh McGregor (1996-04-23), Update on N 1270 and N 1326 - Ethiopic
3.0	U+1200..1206, 1208..1246, 1248, 124A..124D, 1250..1256, 1258, 125A..125D, 1260..1286, 1288, 128A..128D, 1290..12AE, 12B0, 12B2..12B5, 12B8..12BE, 12C0, 12C2..12C5, 12C8..12CE, 12D0..12D6, 12D8..12EE, 12F0..130E, 1310, 1312..1315, 1318..131E, 1320..1346, 1348..135A, 1361..137C	345	UTC/1996-024	X3L2/96-067		Everson, Michael; Becker, Joe (1996-06-04), Michael Everson Response to SOAS
3.0	U+1200..1206, 1208..1246, 1248, 124A..124D, 1250..1256, 1258, 125A..125D, 1260..1286, 1288, 128A..128D, 1290..12AE, 12B0, 12B2..12B5, 12B8..12BE, 12C0, 12C2..12C5, 12C8..12CE, 12D0..12D6, 12D8..12EE, 12F0..130E, 1310, 1312..1315, 1318..131E, 1320..1346, 1348..135A, 1361..137C	345	UTC/1996-025			Becker, Joe, Follow up response to WG2 N1326 re Encoding of Ethiopic Syllabary
3.0	U+1200..1206, 1208..1246, 1248, 124A..124D, 1250..1256, 1258, 125A..125D, 1260..1286, 1288, 128A..128D, 1290..12AE, 12B0, 12B2..12B5, 12B8..12BE, 12C0, 12C2..12C5, 12C8..12CE, 12D0..12D6, 12D8..12EE, 12F0..130E, 1310, 1312..1315, 1318..131E, 1320..1346, 1348..135A, 1361..137C	345			N1353	Umamaheswaran, V. S.; Ksar, Mike (1996-06-25), "8.4", Draft minutes of WG2 Copenhagen Meeting # 30
3.0	U+1200..1206, 1208..1246, 1248, 124A..124D, 1250..1256, 1258, 125A..125D, 1260..1286, 1288, 128A..128D, 1290..12AE, 12B0, 12B2..12B5, 12B8..12BE, 12C0, 12C2..12C5, 12C8..12CE, 12D0..12D6, 12D8..12EE, 12F0..130E, 1310, 1312..1315, 1318..131E, 1320..1346, 1348..135A, 1361..137C	345			N1420	Becker, Joe (1996-07-27), Conclusive Proposal for Encoding of Ethiopic Syllabary, Update
3.0	U+1200..1206, 1208..1246, 1248, 124A..124D, 1250..1256, 1258, 125A..125D, 1260..1286, 1288, 128A..128D, 1290..12AE, 12B0, 12B2..12B5, 12B8..12BE, 12C0, 12C2..12C5, 12C8..12CE, 12D0..12D6, 12D8..12EE, 12F0..130E, 1310, 1312..1315, 1318..131E, 1320..1346, 1348..135A, 1361..137C	345		X3L2/96-119	N1485	Adams, Glenn (1996-12-01), Proposed Draft Amendment No. 10 to ISO/IEC 10646-1
3.0	U+1200..1206, 1208..1246, 1248, 124A..124D, 1250..1256, 1258, 125A..125D, 1260..1286, 1288, 128A..128D, 1290..12AE, 12B0, 12B2..12B5, 12B8..12BE, 12C0, 12C2..12C5, 12C8..12CE, 12D0..12D6, 12D8..12EE, 12F0..130E, 1310, 1312..1315, 1318..131E, 1320..1346, 1348..135A, 1361..137C	345			N1453	Ksar, Mike; Umamaheswaran, V. S. (1996-12-06), "8.5", WG 2 Minutes - Quebec Meeting 31
3.0	U+1200..1206, 1208..1246, 1248, 124A..124D, 1250..1256, 1258, 125A..125D, 1260..1286, 1288, 128A..128D, 1290..12AE, 12B0, 12B2..12B5, 12B8..12BE, 12C0, 12C2..12C5, 12C8..12CE, 12D0..12D6, 12D8..12EE, 12F0..130E, 1310, 1312..1315, 1318..131E, 1320..1346, 1348..135A, 1361..137C	345		X3L2/96-123		Aliprand, Joan; Winkler, Arnold (1996-12-18), "6.2.3", Preliminary Minutes - UTC #71 & X3L2 #168 ad hoc meeting, San Diego - December 5-6, 1996
3.0	U+1200..1206, 1208..1246, 1248, 124A..124D, 1250..1256, 1258, 125A..125D, 1260..1286, 1288, 128A..128D, 1290..12AE, 12B0, 12B2..12B5, 12B8..12BE, 12C0, 12C2..12C5, 12C8..12CE, 12D0..12D6, 12D8..12EE, 12F0..130E, 1310, 1312..1315, 1318..131E, 1320..1346, 1348..135A, 1361..137C	345		L2/97-003		Paterson, Bruce (1997-01-28), Combined PDAM registration and ballot for FPDAM 10: Ethiopic script
3.0	U+1200..1206, 1208..1246, 1248, 124A..124D, 1250..1256, 1258, 125A..125D, 1260..1286, 1288, 128A..128D, 1290..12AE, 12B0, 12B2..12B5, 12B8..12BE, 12C0, 12C2..12C5, 12C8..12CE, 12D0..12D6, 12D8..12EE, 12F0..130E, 1310, 1312..1315, 1318..131E, 1320..1346, 1348..135A, 1361..137C	345			N1594	Summary of Voting/Table of Replies, Amendment 10 – Ethiopic, 1997-06-17
3.0	U+1200..1206, 1208..1246, 1248, 124A..124D, 1250..1256, 1258, 125A..125D, 1260..1286, 1288, 128A..128D, 1290..12AE, 12B0, 12B2..12B5, 12B8..12BE, 12C0, 12C2..12C5, 12C8..12CE, 12D0..12D6, 12D8..12EE, 12F0..130E, 1310, 1312..1315, 1318..131E, 1320..1346, 1348..135A, 1361..137C	345		L2/97-159	N1614	Resolving Japanese Comments on pDAM 10 [Ethiopic], 1997-07-01
3.0	U+1200..1206, 1208..1246, 1248, 124A..124D, 1250..1256, 1258, 125A..125D, 1260..1286, 1288, 128A..128D, 1290..12AE, 12B0, 12B2..12B5, 12B8..12BE, 12C0, 12C2..12C5, 12C8..12CE, 12D0..12D6, 12D8..12EE, 12F0..130E, 1310, 1312..1315, 1318..131E, 1320..1346, 1348..135A, 1361..137C	345		L2/97-288	N1603	Umamaheswaran, V. S. (1997-10-24), "6.2", Unconfirmed Meeting Minutes, WG 2 Meeting # 33, Heraklion, Crete, Greece, 20 June – 4 July 1997
3.0	U+1200..1206, 1208..1246, 1248, 124A..124D, 1250..1256, 1258, 125A..125D, 1260..1286, 1288, 128A..128D, 1290..12AE, 12B0, 12B2..12B5, 12B8..12BE, 12C0, 12C2..12C5, 12C8..12CE, 12D0..12D6, 12D8..12EE, 12F0..130E, 1310, 1312..1315, 1318..131E, 1320..1346, 1348..135A, 1361..137C	345		L2/97-276	N1630	Report on JTC1/SC2 letter ballot on FPDAM No. 10 to ISO/IEC 10646-1 (Ethiopic Script), 1997-12-01
3.0	U+1200..1206, 1208..1246, 1248, 124A..124D, 1250..1256, 1258, 125A..125D, 1260..1286, 1288, 128A..128D, 1290..12AE, 12B0, 12B2..12B5, 12B8..12BE, 12C0, 12C2..12C5, 12C8..12CE, 12D0..12D6, 12D8..12EE, 12F0..130E, 1310, 1312..1315, 1318..131E, 1320..1346, 1348..135A, 1361..137C	345		L2/98-018		Disposition of Comments Report on Document SC 2 N 2805, Combined PDAM Registration and FPDAM ballot: Amendment 10: Ethioptic Script, 1998-01-14
3.0	U+1200..1206, 1208..1246, 1248, 124A..124D, 1250..1256, 1258, 125A..125D, 1260..1286, 1288, 128A..128D, 1290..12AE, 12B0, 12B2..12B5, 12B8..12BE, 12C0, 12C2..12C5, 12C8..12CE, 12D0..12D6, 12D8..12EE, 12F0..130E, 1310, 1312..1315, 1318..131E, 1320..1346, 1348..135A, 1361..137C	345		L2/98-316		Notices of publication for various amendments and standards
3.0	U+1200..1206, 1208..1246, 1248, 124A..124D, 1250..1256, 1258, 125A..125D, 1260..1286, 1288, 128A..128D, 1290..12AE, 12B0, 12B2..12B5, 12B8..12BE, 12C0, 12C2..12C5, 12C8..12CE, 12D0..12D6, 12D8..12EE, 12F0..130E, 1310, 1312..1315, 1318..131E, 1320..1346, 1348..135A, 1361..137C	345		L2/99-122		Clews, John (1999-03-31), Ordering labio-velar characters in Ethiopic
3.0	U+1200..1206, 1208..1246, 1248, 124A..124D, 1250..1256, 1258, 125A..125D, 1260..1286, 1288, 128A..128D, 1290..12AE, 12B0, 12B2..12B5, 12B8..12BE, 12C0, 12C2..12C5, 12C8..12CE, 12D0..12D6, 12D8..12EE, 12F0..130E, 1310, 1312..1315, 1318..131E, 1320..1346, 1348..135A, 1361..137C	345		L2/00-282		Everson, Michael (2000-08-25), Proposed glyph fixes for Ethiopic pages in ISO/IEC 10646-1:2000
4.1	U+1207, 1247, 1287, 12AF, 12CF, 12EF, 130F, 131F, 1347, 135F..1360	11	UTC/1991-026	X3L2/91-024		Anderson, Lloyd (1991-02-26), On the Extended Ethiopic Alphabet
4.1	U+1207, 1247, 1287, 12AF, 12CF, 12EF, 130F, 131F, 1347, 135F..1360	11		L2/98-300	N1846	Everson, Michael; Yacob, Daniel (1998-09-11), Proposal to encode Ethiopic Extensions in the BMP of ISO/IEC 10646
4.1	U+1207, 1247, 1287, 12AF, 12CF, 12EF, 130F, 131F, 1347, 135F..1360	11		L2/04-143	N2747	Yacob, Daniel (2004-04-23), Revision of the N1846 Proposal to add Extended Ethiopic to the BMP of the UCS
4.1	U+1207, 1247, 1287, 12AF, 12CF, 12EF, 130F, 131F, 1347, 135F..1360	11		L2/04-265R	N2814R	Everson, Michael; Yacob, Daniel (2004-06-18), Revisions proposed to N2747 (Extended Ethiopic)
4.1	U+1207, 1247, 1287, 12AF, 12CF, 12EF, 130F, 131F, 1347, 135F..1360	11		L2/11-261R2		Moore, Lisa (2011-08-16), "Consensus 128-C6", UTC #128 / L2 #225 Minutes, "Change the general category from "So" to "Po" ... [U+1360]"
6.0	U+135D..135E	2		L2/09-050R	N3572	Priest, Lorna (2009-02-05), Proposal to Encode Additional Ethiopic Characters
6.0	U+135D..135E	2		L2/09-003R		Moore, Lisa (2009-02-12), "B.15.16", UTC #118 / L2 #215 Minutes
6.0	U+135D..135E	2		L2/09-234	N3603 (pdf, doc)	Umamaheswaran, V. S. (2009-07-08), "M54.11", Unconfirmed minutes of WG 2 meeting 54
