= Daniel Yohannes Haggos =

Ethiopian musician and academic (born 1950)

Daniel Yohannes Haggos (born 1950) is an Ethiopian-German musician and academic. He composed the national anthem of Ethiopia from 1975 to 1992, Ethiopia, Ethiopia, Ethiopia be first.

== Biography ==
Following the 3 February 1977 execution of Derg Chairman Tafari Benti and his replacement with Mengistu Haile Mariam, Daniel, who at the time was a member of the Ethiopian delegation to the ongoing FESTAC 77, fled to West Germany with several other delegation members.

In 1991, Daniel, now a German citizen, was an associate professor at the University of Bonn in Germany and head of the African Culture Centre in Bonn. The same year, he visited the University of South Africa.

== See also ==
- Assefa Gebre-Mariam Tessema, the writer of the national anthem of Ethiopia from 1975 to 1992
