= March Forward, Dear Mother Ethiopia =

National anthem of Ethiopia

Yezegenet kiber
English: Respect for every Citizen in Ethiopia
- የዜግነት ክብር
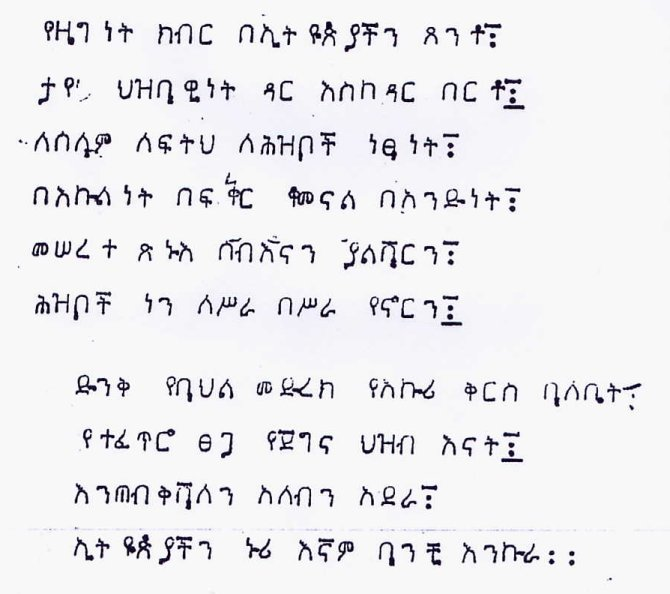
- National anthem of Ethiopia
- Lyrics: Dereje Melaku Mengesha
- Music: Solomon Lulu Mitiku
- Adopted: 1992
- Preceded by: Ethiopia, Ethiopia, Ethiopia be first

Audio sample
- U.S. Navy Band instrumental version: file; help

"March Forward, Dear Mother Ethiopia" (Amharic: ወደፊት ገስግሺ ውድ እናት ኢትዮጵያ, romanized: Wedefīt Gesigishī Wid Inat ītiyop’iya), also known by its incipit as "Honour of Citizenship" (Amharic: የዜግነት ክብር, romanized: Yezēginet Kibir), is the national anthem of Ethiopia.

== History ==
The lyrics were written by Dereje Melaku Mengesha, and the music was composed by Solomon Lulu Mitiku. The song was adopted in 1992, as part of reforms that followed the collapse of the People's Democratic Republic of Ethiopia.

== Lyrics ==
Amharic original (Ge'ez script)

የዜግነት ፡ ክብር ፡ በኢትዮጵያችን ፡ ጸንቶ ፣
ታየ ፡ ሕዝባዊነት ፡ ዳር ፡ እስከዳር ፡ በርቶ ።

ለሰላም ፣ ለፍትህ ፣ ለሕዝቦች ፡ ነጻነት ፣
በእኩልነት ፡ በፍቅር ፡ ቆመናል ፡ ባንድነት ።
መሠረተ ፡ ጽኑ ፡ ሰብእናን ፡ ያልሻርን ፣
ሕዝቦች ፡ ነን ፡ ለሥራ ፡ በሥራ ፡ የኖርን ።

ድንቅ ፡ የባህል ፡ መድረክ ፡ ያኩሪ ፡ ቅርስ ፡ ባለቤት ፣
የተፈጥሮ ፡ ጸጋ ፡ የጀግና ፡ ሕዝብ ፡ እናት ።
እንጠብቅሻለን ፡ አለብን ፡ አደራ ፣
ኢትዮጵያችን ፡ ኑሪ ፡ እኛም ፡ ባንቺ ፡ እንኩራ ።

Transliteration

Yäzégennät keber bä-Ityopp’yachen s’änto;
Tayyä hezbawinnät dar eskädar bärto.

Läsälam läfeteh lähezboch näs’annät,
Bä’ekkulennät bäfeqer qomänal bandennät.
Mäsärätä s’enu säbe’enan yalsharen;
Hezboch nän läsera bäsera yänoren.

Denq yäbahel mädräk yakuri qers baläbêt,
Yätäfät’ro s’ägga yäjägna hezb ennat;
Ennet’äbbeqeshallän alläbben adära;
Ityopp’yachen nuri eññam banchi ennekura!

IPA transcription (Note: See Help:IPA/Amharic and Amharic § Phonology.)

[jə.ze.gɨn.nət kɨ.βɨɾ bəi̯.tjo.pʼja.t͡ʃɨn t͡s’ən.to]
[ta.jə hɨz.ba.win.nət daɾ ɨs.kə.daɾ bəɾ.to ǁ]

[lə.sə.lam lə.fɨ.tɨh lə.hɨz.bot͡ʃ nə.t͡s’an.nət |]
[bəɨ̯k.ku.lɨn.nət bəf.k’ɨɾ k’o.mə.nal ban.dɨn.nət ‖]
[mə.sə.ɾə.tə t͡s’ɨ.nu sə.βɨː.nan jal.ʃa.ɾɨn |]
[hɨz.bot͡ʃ nən lə.sɨ.ɾa bə.sɨ.ɾa jə.no.ɾɨn ǁ]

[dɨnk’ jə.βa.hɨl məd.ɾək ja.k(u)ɾi k’ɨɾs ba.lə.βet |]
[jə.tə.fət’.ɾo t͡s’əg.ga jə.d͡ʒəg.na hɨzb ɨn.nat |]
[ɨnː.t’əb.bɨ.k’ɨ.ʃal.lən al.ləb.bɨn a.də.ɾa |]
[i.tjo.p’ja.t͡ʃɨn nu.ɾi ɨɲ.ɲam ban.t͡ʃi‿(ɨ)n.nɨ.k(u)ɾa ‖]

Oromo translation

Tabaroon lammummaa Itoophiyaa teenyatti jabaatee;
Ummattummaan daangaa hamma daangaatti ifee muldhatee.

Nagaadhaaf, haqaaf, bilisummaa ummatootaaf,
Walqixxummaafi jaalalaan dhaabbanneerra tokkummaaf.
Hunde- jabeessa namummaa hinmulqine;
Uummattoota hojiif hojiidhaan jiraanne.

Waltajjii aadaa maalalchiistuu warra hambaa buleeyyii,
Ayyaana uumamaa, harmee ummata jajjabeeyyii.
Isin ni eegna – irbuu qabna;
Itoophiyaa teenya nuuf le'i nus siin boonna!

Tigrinya translation

ምኽባር ዜግነት ኣብ ኢትዮጵያና ሓያል እዩ፤
ሃገራዊ ኩርዓት ካብ ሓደ ወገን ናብ ካልእ ወገን እናበርሀ ይረአ።

ምእንቲ ሰላም፡ ምእንቲ ፍትሒ፡ ምእንቲ ናጽነት ህዝብታት፡
ኣብ ማዕርነትን ብፍቕርን ሓድነትና ደው ንብል።
ጽኑዕ መሰረት፡ ሰብኣውነት ኣይንነጽጎን ኢና፤
ብስራሕ እንነብር ሰባት ኢና።

ግርም እዩ መድረኽ ትውፊት፣ ወነንቲ ዘኹርዕ ቅርሲ፣
ተፈጥሮኣዊ ጸጋ ኣደ ጅግና ህዝቢ።
ክንከላኸለኩም ኢና - ግዴታ ኣለና፤
ኢትዮጵያና ንበር! ብኣኻ ድማ ንሕበን!

English translation

Respect for citizenship is strong in our Ethiopia;
National pride is seen, shining from one side to another.

For peace, for justice, for the freedom of peoples,
In equality and in love we stand united.
Firm of foundation, we do not dismiss humanness;
We are people who live through work.

Wonderful is the stage of tradition, owners of a proud heritage,
Natural grace, mother of a valorous people.
We shall protect you – we have a duty;
Our Ethiopia, live! And let us be proud of you!

== See also ==
- "Ethiopia, Ethiopia, Ethiopia be first", the national anthem from 1975 to 1992
