= Love to the Grave =

1968 Amharic novel by Haddis Alemayehu

Love unto Grave
- Author: Haddis Alemayehu
- Translator: Sisay Ayenew
- Language: Amharic
- Genre: Tragedy
- Published: 1968
- Publisher: Mega Publishing & Distribution PLC
- Publication place: Ethiopia
- Pages: 552
- OCLC: 271731071

Love to the Grave (Amharic: ፍቅር እስከ መቃብር) is an Amharic novel by Haddis Alemayehu published in 1968. It is one of the best known novels in Ethiopia and is considered a classic of Ethiopian literature. The novel gained popularity largely due to its widespread dissemination on Ethiopian radio during the Derg regime. It was featured on the popular radio program Kemetsahifit Alem (From the World of Books) by host Wegayehu Nigatu. The author himself later praised Wegayehu for "giving life to the characters in the story" with his narration of the novel. An English translation by Sisay Ayenew, titled Love Unto Crypt, was published in 2005.

== Plot ==
Bezabeh is one of the main characters and the only child of Wudenesh Betamu and Bogale Mebratu. The story describes Bezabeh's illness in infancy and childhood. When his father Bogale was young, he lost his parents and lived in poor conditions until encountering a rich woman named Wudenesh, whose three husbands tragically died. The priest Tamiru struggles to bring them together, hence the title Feker Eske Mekaber.

After marrying two years later, they conceive a boy named Bezabeh, who undergoes successive illnesses. At three months, Bezabeh suffers from a disease called ankelis; at the age of 6, he suffers from a respiratory ailment called kuwakuat, and measles at the end of the year. This combination of diseases nearly kills him.

While having ankelis, his symptoms began with chronic fever and shortness of breath. His stunned father checks if he is alive, and his mother prays aloud to save her boy from dying. Bezabeh sleeps deeply before awaking surprisedly with a yawn and laughing.

The symptoms of ankelis fit with febrile seizure – chronic fever accompanied by convulsion. The child also experiences twitching or rigidity in one part of his body. Although frightening to his parents, the condition is harmless. Alemayehu notes that the ankelis is caused by his near-death experience.

The book centers on a romance between the beautiful Seble, daughter of nobles Fitawrari Meshesha and Weyzero Tiruaynet. She remains unmarried as nobody is considered noble enough for her, but when a tutor arrives they fall in love. Sahle Sellassie Berhane Mariam, commissioned by Heinemann to write a report on the book ahead of a potential translation, wrote:

Masterfully grafted to this love theme unfolds another, more serious story – the relation of the traditional nobleman Meshesha and his peasant-tenants, a relation that ends in a peasants' revolt, and the subsequent humiliation of the captured Meshesha. The leader of the peasant revolt does not kill Meshesha. He prefers to make him a laughing stock to all who know him by capturing him alive and taking him to the provincial court...

Feker Eske Mekaber [Love Unto Death] is not only the longest Amharic novel so far written (about 106,000 words), but also the best in many ways. The language is clear and beautiful although sometimes ecclesiastical jargons that are inevitably sprayed here and there are difficult to understand for those readers (including myself) unfamiliar with Ge'ez, the classical Ethiopian language. Otherwise the words are vivid and reveal the imaginative grasp of the author...

For the post war Ethiopian generation Feker Eske Mekaber is a social history; a social history that is groaning under the pressures of modernity, but that is not totally dead and buried.

A proper translation of the book into English and some other languages will reveal that the theme is closer to the social setting of Europe and Russia of the pre-industrial era than to that of the present-day Africa. It bears no resemblance to the themes developed by other [African] writers of today.

== Reception ==
"It was an immediate success, and remains to date one of the most read and cherished Amharic novels. In 1969 he won the Haylä Səlasse I Prize for Amharic Literature." The novel is one of the most famous in Ethiopia. It is particularly popular among those individuals who lived through the Derg regime of the 1970s and 1980s, during which it was once narrated on the radio by Wegayehu Nigatu. A music video titled "Mar Eske Twauf" by award-winning Ethiopian music star Teddy Afro, based on the novel, has been released on YouTube.

== TV adaptation ==
The Ethiopian Broadcasting Corporation (EBC) adapted the novel to television series on 11 September 2024 which was directed by Sewmehon Yismaw and produced by Sew Mehon Productions. With the budget of 41,427,600 birr, its production began around 2023, consisting of four seasons and forty eight episodes. The series stars Mehari Molla, Mekdes Degaderege, Gizachew Aderaw, Hiruy Demelash and Etsegenet Aseged as lead roles.

== Literature in Amharic ==
- ገዛኸኝ ጸጋው. በብሌን(1982) የፍቅር እስከ መቃብር “ስሑት አስተያየቶች” ላይሒሳዊ ፍካሬ. Ethiopian Journal of Languages and Literature Vol. XV 81-95. 2019.
- ፈጠነ ወርቁ፤ 1996፤ “የሰብለ አሳሳልበ ‹ፍቅርእስከመቃብር›፤” Addis Ababa University፤ ለኢትዮጵያ ቋንቋዎችና ሥነጽሑፍ ክፍለ ትምህርት የቀረበ ዲማጽ፡

== Literature in English ==
- Assefa, Taye, and Shiferaw Bekele. "The study of Amharic literature: an overview." Journal of Ethiopian Studies 33, no. 2 (2000): 27-73.
- Abakano, Bezaye (2010). Dynamic Equivalence and Formal Correspondence in Sisay Ayenew's "Love Unto Crypt" (PDF) (Thesis). Addis Ababa University.
- Ayele, Tesfaye Woubshet. "Haddis Alemayehu’s Vision of the Old World: Literary Realism and the Tragedy of History in the Amharic Novel Fikir iske Mekabir." Cambridge Journal of Postcolonial Literary Inquiry (2023): 1-24.
- Marzagora, Sara. Alterity, coloniality and modernity in Ethiopian political thought: the first three generations of 20th century Amharic-language intellectuals. PhD diss., SOAS, University of London, 2016.
- Mennasemay, Maimire. "Fiqer eskä Mäqaber: A Qiné Hermeneutical Reading." International Journal of Ethiopian Studies 10, no. 1 & 2 (2016): 1-34.
- WondwosenAdane.1998.“Incognitos of Christ in the Amharic Novel: A Critical Study of Archetypical Mimesis and its Literary Function Based on Two ‹Novels›” Addis Ababa University MA thesis.
