= Ethiopian literature =

Ethiopian literature dates from Ancient Ethiopian literature (around 300 AD) up until modern Ethiopian literature. Ancient Ethiopian literature starts with Axumite texts written in the Geʽez language using the Geʽez script, indigenous to both Ethiopia and Eritrea.

== Axumite literature (330–900) ==
There is linguistic evidence of Semitic languages being spoken in Ethiopia since 2000 BC.

Ge'ez literature began with Christianity being declared the state religion around 340 AD by King Ezana. However, Christianity has existed since 100 AD in Ethiopia.

The oldest known example of the old Ge'ez script is found on the Hawulti obelisk in Matara, Eritrea. The oldest surviving Ge'ez manuscript is the 5th or 6th century Garima Gospels.

Almost all texts from this early "Aksumite" period are religious (Christian) in nature, translated from Greek. Up till the 4th century, Aksumite royal inscriptions are commonly in both Greek and Ge'ez; but from 350, the Aksumite kings increasingly employed only Ge'ez; and it is likely that the translation of the Bible was embarked on soon after, and was complete by the end of the 5th century. The Ethiopic Bible contains 81 Books; 46 of the Old Testament and 35 of the New. A number of these Books are called "deuterocanonical" (or "apocryphal" according to certain Western theologians), such as the Ascension of Isaiah, Jubilees, Enoch, the Paralipomena of Baruch, Noah, Ezra, Nehemiah, Maccabees, and Tobit. The Book of Enoch in particular is notable since its complete text has survived in no other language.

Also to this early period dates Qerellos, a collection of Christological writings beginning with the treatise of Saint Cyril (known as Hamanot Rete’et or De Recta Fide). These works are the theological foundation of the Ethiopic Church. Another important religious document is Ser'ata Paknemis, a translation of the monastic Rules of Pachomius. Secular works translated in this period include Physiologus, a religious interpretation of natural history that is also very popular in Europe.

== Medieval literature (1200–1672) ==
"The most common form of written history sponsored by the Solomonic royal court was the biography of contemporary rulers, who were often lauded by their biographers along with the Solomonic dynasty. The royal biographical genre was established during the reign of Amda Seyon I (r. 1314–1344), whose biography not only recounted the diplomatic exchanges and military conflicts with the rival Islamic Ifat Sultanate, but also depicted the Ethiopian ruler as the Christian savior of his nation. The chronicle titled, The Glorious Victories of Amda Seyon, is far more detailed than any previous Ethiopian work of history and is regraded by historian Richard Pankhurst to be a "masterpiece in historical chronicling". The origins of the dynastic history (tarika nagast) are perhaps found in the biographical chronicle of Baeda Maryam I (r. 1468–1478), which provides a narrative of his life and that of his children and was most likely written by the preceptor of the royal court. Teshale Tibebu asserts that Ethiopian court historians were "professional flatterers" of their ruling monarchs, akin to their Byzantine Greek and Imperial Chinese counterparts. For instance, the anonymously written biography of the emperor Gelawdewos (r. 1540–1549) speaks glowingly of the ruler, albeit in an elegiac tone, while attempting to place him and his deeds within a greater moral and historical context."

=== Christianity ===
After the decline of the Aksumites, a lengthy gap follows; no works have survived that can be dated to the years of the 8th through 12th centuries. Only with the rise of the Solomonic dynasty around 1270 there is an evidence of authors committing their works to writings. Some writers consider the period beginning from the 14th century an actual "Golden Age" of Ge'ez literature—although by this time Ge'ez was no longer a living language. While there is ample evidence that it had been replaced by the Amharic language in the south and by the Tigrigna and Tigre languages in the north, Ge'ez remained in use as the official written language until the 19th century, its status comparable to that of Medieval Latin in Europe.

The early 15th century Fekkare Iyasus "The Explication of Jesus" contains a prophecy of a king called Tewodros, which rose to importance in 19th century Ethiopia as Tewodros II chose this throne name.

Literature flourished especially during the reign of Emperor Zara Yaqob. Written by the Emperor himself were Mats'hafe Berhan ("The Book of Light") and Mats'hafe Milad ("The Book of Nativity"). Numerous homilies were written in this period, notably Retu’a Haimanot ("True Orthodoxy") ascribed to John Chrysostom. Also of monumental importance was the appearance of the Ge'ez translation of the Fetha Negest ("Laws of the Kings"), thought to have been made around 1450, and ascribed to one Petros Abda Sayd – that was later to function as the supreme Law for Ethiopia, until it was replaced by a modern Constitution in 1931.

Another significant medieval Ethiopian text is The History of Alexander, believed to have been written around 1500. It narrates the life and conquests of Alexander the Great, depicting him as a Christian warrior.

By the beginning of the 16th century, the Islamic invasions put an end to the flourishing of Ethiopian literature. A letter of Abba 'Enbaqom (or "Habakkuk") to Imam Ahmad Ibn Ibrahim, entitled Anqasa Amin ("Gate of the Faith"), giving his reasons for abandoning Islam, although probably first written in Arabic and later rewritten in an expanded Ge'ez version around 1532, is considered one of the classics of later Ge'ez literature.

During this period, Ethiopian writers begin to address differences between the Ethiopian and the Roman Catholic Church in such works as the Confession of Emperor Gelawdewos, Sawana Nafs ("Refuge of the Soul"), Fekkare Malakot ("Exposition of the Godhead") and Haymanote Abaw ("Faith of the Fathers"). Around the year 1600, a number of works were translated from Arabic into Ge'ez for the first time, including the Chronicle of John of Nikiu and the Universal History of Jirjis ibn al'Amid Abi'l-Wasir (also known as al-Makin).

=== Jewish ===
Most Jewish manuscripts in Ethiopia seem to be heavily influenced by Biblical or Christian texts. Ethiopian Orthodox Christians also use many texts used by the Beta Israel but other rabbinic Jewish groups but not other Christian groups. Among the most famous Jewish manuscripts in Ethiopia is the Ethiopic Apocalypse of Ezra.

=== Islamic ===
Most of Islamic literature of Ethiopia is center in the eastern lowland with Harar being the most important.

== Early modern literature (16th–18th century) ==
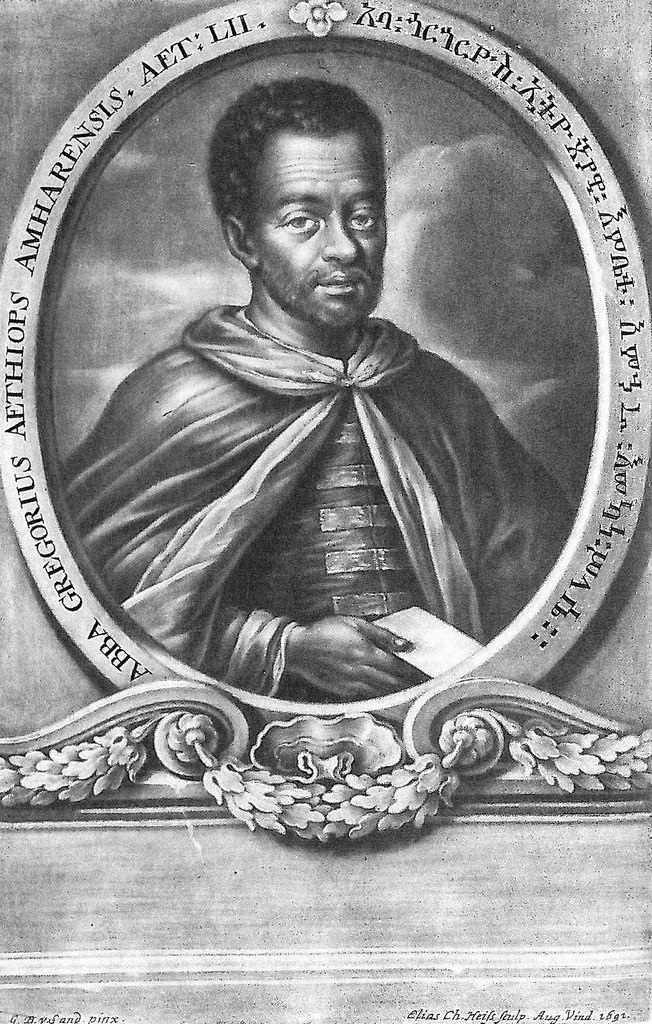
Portrait of Abba Gorgoryos (Abba Gorgorios) by Elias Christopher Heiss, Augsburg, 1691, in a supplementary volume to the 1681 Historia Aethiopica by Hiob Ludolf

It is during this period that Amharic started to emerge as a written language. One of the most important people of this era is Ethiopian priest and lexicographer, Abba Gorgoryos (1595–1658). Gorgoryos along with his colleague and friend Hiob Ludolf co-authored the earliest grammar book of the Amharic language and also an Amharic-Latin dictionary. Amharic became the first African language to be translated into Latin. Gorgoryos's other accomplishments include developing a Ge'ez lexicon, co-authoring encyclopedias for both Amharic and Ge'ez as well as contributing to Ludolf's book A History of Ethiopia.

Another important figure in this era is the Ethiopian monk Abba Bahrey. Bahrey was both a historian and an ethnographer who is best known for his 1593 work The History of the Galla (Ge'ez: ዜናሁ ፡ ለጋላ, zēnāhū lagāllā). Written in Ge'ez, it told of the history of the Oromo and their 16th-century migration into what is now central and western Ethiopia. This work was significant because it is the only documentation of the Oromo people in the 16th century. Bahrey also authored The History of King Sarsa Dengel which chronicles the reign of Emperor Sarsa Dengel.

== Modern period (19th century – present) ==
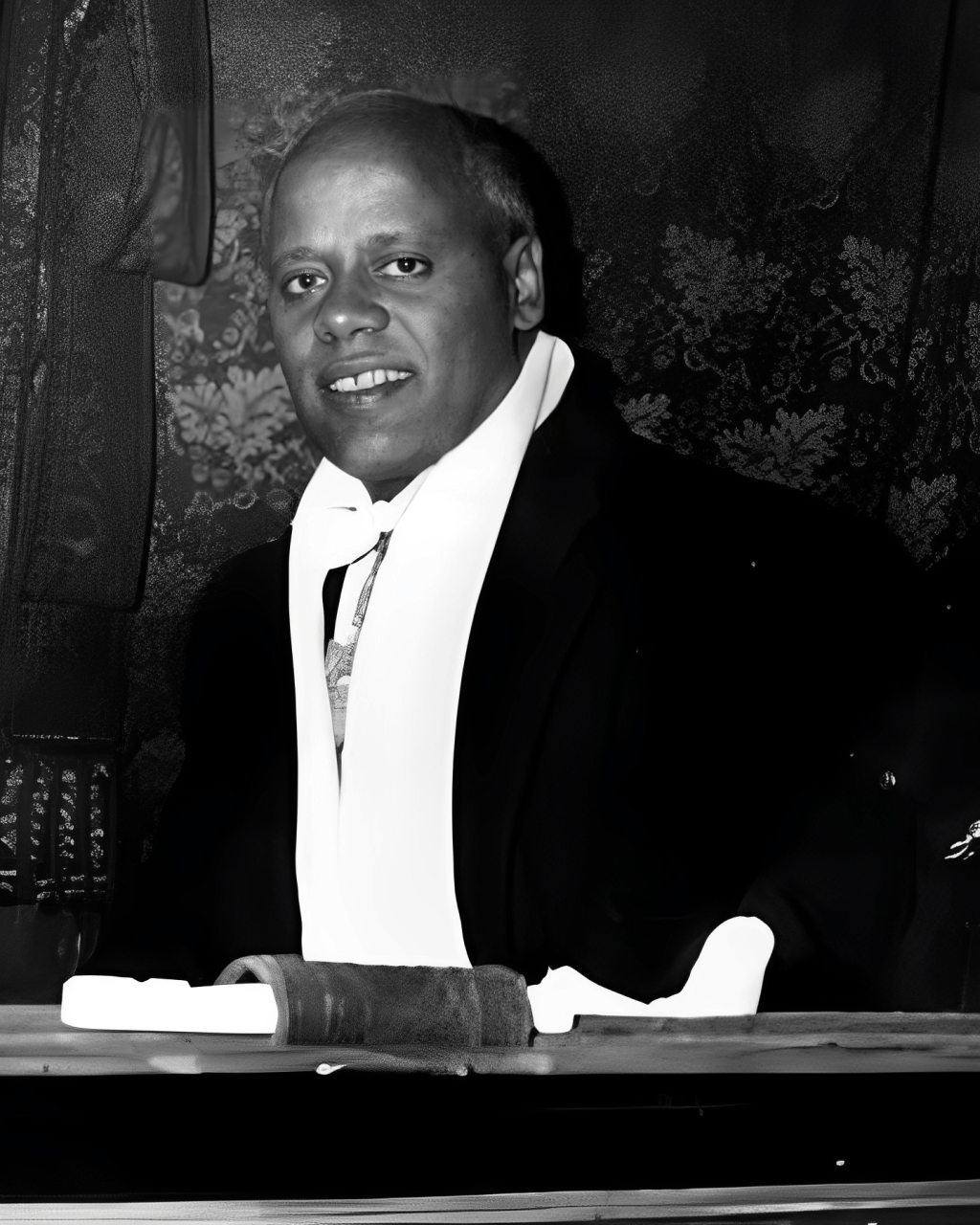
Ethiopian author Haddis Alemayehu

Perhaps the most famous literary contributor to this century is author Haddis Alemayehu. His tragic novel, Love to the Grave (ፍቅር እስከ መቃብር; Fəqər əskä Mäqabər), is one of the most renowned books in modern Ethiopian literature, considered a modern masterpiece. Baalu Girma's Oromay (1983) is also well-regarded.

Emperor Haile Selassie wrote an autobiography, My Life and Ethiopia's Progress in 1973–74.

== Legal text ==
In 1240 AD, the structure of the church and the country was organized according to Fetha Nagast.

== See also ==
- Ethiopian historiography

== Sources ==
- De Lorenzi, James (2015), Guardians of the Tradition: Historians and Historical Writing in Ethiopia and Eritrea, Rochester: University of Rochester Press, ISBN 978-1-58046-519-9.
- Tibebu, Teshale (1995), The Making of Modern Ethiopia, 1896-1974, Lawrenceville, NJ: Red Sea Press, ISBN 1-56902-001-9.
