= Geʽez Braille =

Braille alphabet for all Ethiopic languages

Geʽez Braille Amharic Braille
- Script type: alphabet
- Print basis: Geʽez script
- Languages: Amharic; possibly also Tigrinya, Tigre, etc.

Related scripts
- Parent systems: Braille: English Braille; Geʽez Braille

Geʽez Braille is a collection of braille alphabets for the Ethiopian languages that are written in Geʽez script in print. Letter values are mostly in line with international usage. At least Amharic is supported; perhaps the extended letters needed for Tigrinya, Tigre and possibly other Ethiopian languages are supported as well, but if so that is not recorded in available references.

== Amharic alphabet ==
Amharic Braille may be an abugida like the print Geʽez script, but the inherent vowel is epenthetic ə /ɨ/ rather than a /ɐ/. The same letter is used for syllables ending in the vowel ə as for the bare consonant. Other syllables are written with this letter plus a second letter for the vowel. Thus the system is very close to a true alphabet, with any inherent ə vowel often but evidently not always predictable.

The photograph of the syllabic chart at right shows a blank cell ⟨⠀⟩ being used for the inherent vowel ə. That is perhaps an artefact of the presentation; UNESCO (2013) shows that is simply not written.

Amharic Braille alphabet
-ä	-u	-i	-a	-e	-o	-wa
h ሀ	l ለ	ḥ ሐ	m መ	ś ሠ	r ረ	s ሰ
š ሸ	ḳ ቀ	b በ	t ተ	č ቸ	ḫ ኀ	n ነ
ñ ኘ	ʾ አ	k ከ	x ኸ	w ወ	ʿ ዐ	z ዘ
ž ዠ	y የ	d ደ	ǧ ጀ	g ገ	ṭ ጠ	č̣ ጨ
p̣ ጰ	ṣ ጸ	ṣ́ ፀ	f ፈ	p ፐ	v ቨ	

⟨ə⟩ is not the default vowel in print Amharic, which is instead ⟨ä⟩ (braille ⠢). For most consonants, a is the only vowel that can occur in a Cw- syllable, so -wa has its own letter: ⠭. CwV and CyV syllables other than ⠭ -wa are written with medial ⠺ w and ⠽ y:

Amharic syllables
⠛⠢	⠛⠥	⠛⠊	⠛⠁	⠛⠑	⠛	⠛⠕
ገ gä	ጉ gu	ጊ gi	ጋ ga	ጌ ge	ግ gə	ጎ go
⠛⠺⠢		⠛⠺⠊	⠛⠭	⠛⠺⠑	⠛⠺⠥	
ጐ gwä		ጒ gwi	ጓ gwa	ጔ gwe	ጕ gwə	

Note that -wə is written ⠺⠥, as if it were -wu, a combination that does not occur in print.

== Numbers ==
Ethiopic digits do not follow the international pattern. They are also circumfixed with ⠁ ... ⠆:

፩	1	⠁⠁⠆	፲	10	⠁⠅⠆
፪	2	⠁⠉⠆	፳	20	⠁⠅⠉⠆
፫	3	⠁⠒⠆	፴	30	⠁⠅⠒⠆
፬	4	⠁⠤⠆	፵	40	⠁⠅⠤⠆
፭	5	⠁⠑⠆	፶	50	⠁⠅⠑⠆
፮	6	⠁⠢⠆	፷	60	⠁⠅⠢⠆
፯	7	⠁⠊⠆	፸	70	⠁⠅⠊⠆
፰	8	⠁⠔⠆	፹	80	⠁⠅⠔⠆
፱	9	⠁⠃⠆	፺	90	⠁⠅⠃⠆
፲	10	⠁⠅⠆	፻	100	⠁⠋⠁⠆

Western numbers are marked with ⠼ as in other braille alphabets.

== Punctuation ==
Native punctuation is as follows:

Print	፡	።	፣	፤	፦	፧	᎐
Braille	⠠ (braille pattern dots-6) ⠄ (braille pattern dots-3)	⠲ (braille pattern dots-256)	⠂ (braille pattern dots-2)	⠆ (braille pattern dots-23)	⠒ (braille pattern dots-25)	⠦ (braille pattern dots-236)	⠐ (braille pattern dots-5)

The last is yizet, one of several interlinear tone marks.

There is also Western punctuation:

Print	?	!	...	-	—	/	*
Braille	⠦ (braille pattern dots-236)	⠖ (braille pattern dots-235)	⠄ (braille pattern dots-3)	⠒ (braille pattern dots-25)	⠤ (braille pattern dots-36)	⠐ (braille pattern dots-5) ⠂ (braille pattern dots-2)	⠔ (braille pattern dots-35)

Print	« ... »	‹ ... ›	( ... )	[ ... ]
Braille	...	...	...	...
