= Haddis Alemayehu =

Ethiopian novelist (1910–2003)

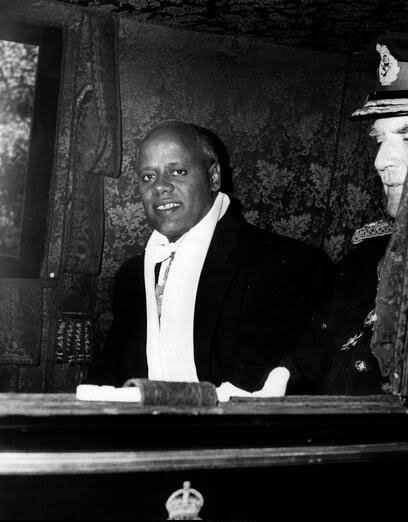
- Haddis Alemayehu in 1961
- Born: 15 October 1910; Endadom Kidane Miheret, Debre Markos, Gojjam Province, Ethiopian Empire
- Died: 6 December 2003 (aged 93); Urael Church, Addis Ababa, Ethiopia
- Occupation: Novelist
- Years active: 1960s–2003
- Writing career
- Pen name: Haddinko
- Language: Amharic
- Period: Modern
- Genre: Classic
- Notable work: Love to the Grave

Minister of Foreign Affairs
- In office 1960–1961
- Monarch: Haile Selassie I
- Prime Minister: Abebe Aregai; Imru Haile Selassie
- Preceded by: Yilma Deressa
- Succeeded by: Mikael Imru

Haddis Alemayehu (Amharic: ሐዲስ ዓለማየሁ; 15 October 1910 – 6 December 2003) was an Ethiopian novelist. His Amharic novel Love to the Grave (Amharic: ፍቅር እስከ መቃብር; Fəqər əskä Mäqabər, 1968) is considered a classic of modern Ethiopian literature.

Aside from literature, he was the Minister of Foreign Affairs from 1960 to 1961.

== Biography ==
Haddis was born in the Endodam Kidane Miheret section, the lower parts of Debre Markos, in the Gojjam province. He was the son of an Orthodox priest, Abba Alemayehu Solomon and his mother, Desta Alemu. He grew up with his mother. As a boy, he began his education within the system of the Ethiopian Orthodox Church, studying at the monasteries of Debre Elias, Debre Werq, and Dima Giorgis where he finally graduated in Qine (type of extended Ethiopian Orthodox Church education). Later, he moved to Addis Ababa where he attended several schools, including the Swedish mission school (1925–1927) and later at the Tafari Makonnen School for further education of the secular sort (EthioView 12 December 2003). He wrote his first play during this period, YeHabeshan yewedehuala Gabcha (The marriage of Habesha and its backwardness) which displayed remarkably mature style. In the early 1930s Haddis returned to Gojjam and worked as a customs clerk and school headmaster before moving to a teaching position at Debre Markos. Haddis Alemayehu fought during the Italian-Ethiopian war for colonialism (1935–36) until he was captured and sent to the Island of Ponza in the western Mediterranean and then to the island of Lipari, near Sardinia. Freed by allied forces Haddis finally returned to Ethiopia (1943). After brief stints in the department of Press and Propaganda and Ministry of Foreign Affaires, he became the Ethiopian consul in Jerusalem (1945–46), where he stayed for about two years. There he met and married Kibebe-Tsehay Belay, who had lived and had been brought up in Jerusalem. Haddis then served as a delegate to the international communications conference in Atlantic City, New Jersey (1946). Afterwards, he received a posting to the Ethiopian mission in Washington, D.C., and at the United Nations (1946–1950). His next assignment was in the Ethiopian Foreign Ministry, first as General Director and then as Vice Minister. During the 1956–1960s he worked as Ethiopian representative to UN. After his return Haddis briefly worked at the Ministry of Education (1960) followed by appointment as Ambassador to Britain and Netherlands (1960–65).

After his recall to Ethiopia, Haddis, who was not in good health, preferred not to enter into government service. Reluctantly, he agreed to become a minister of Planning and Development (1965–66) and also served in the Ethiopian Senate (1968–1974). During the era of the first two years of Derg regime (a newly brought military government taking the advantage of the Ethiopian Revolution), Haddis served as a member of the advisory body that had been created to replace the dissolved parliament. However, he declined the Derg's offer to become Prime Minister, thus removing himself from any meaningful governmental roles. In the meantime he returned to his literature career when he published Fikr Eske Mekabr, his famous novel about love in a feudal Ethiopia. Not only this, he had written Wongelegnaw Dagna (the criminal judge) and yelemezat (sweet only in dreams) and others. He was eventually awarded an honorary doctorate by Addis Ababa University.

== List of publications ==
- Y-Abeša-nna Ye-Wedehʷala gabičča (The Marriage of Ethiopia and the Future)
- Teret Teret Ye-Meseret, 1955 (1948 AM)
- Fəqər əskä Mäqabər (Love until Death), Bərhanənna Sälam Printing Press, 1965 (1958 AM)
- Wenǧeläñña Dañña (The Criminal Judge), Addis Ababa: nəgd Printing Press (Kuraz Publishing Agency) 1981 (1974 AM)
- Ye-Ilm Ižat, Addis Abeba: nəgd Printing Press (Kuraz Publishing Agency) 1987 (1980 AM)
- Tizzita (Memories), Addis Ababa: Artistic Printing Press (Kuraz Publishing Agency) 1992 (1985 AM)

== Relevant literature ==
- Ayele, Tesfaye Woubshet. "Haddis Alemayehu’s Vision of the Old World: Literary Realism and the Tragedy of History in the Amharic Novel Fikir iske Mekabir." Cambridge Journal of Postcolonial Literary Inquiry (2023): 1-24.
