= Imperial Academy (Ethiopia) =

1942–1980s national academy of Ethiopia, now split into independent organisations

The Imperial Academy was the national academy of Ethiopia, first established by the Ministry of Education and Fine Arts in 1942. It was tasked with preserving the "traditional genius" of the country; among other things, the native Ethiopic script and the literary and scholarly tradition it enabled, as well as the "promotion of research in languages and fine arts".

In 1956, Emperor Haile Selassie promulgated a decree chartering the Academy as an independent organisation. The Academy, as a single body, eventually ceased to operate during the time of the Derg regime in the 1980s, although some of its constituent organizations have persisted—directly or indirectly—to the present.

== Constituent bodies ==
At the time of its foundation, the Academy comprised three subsidiary groups: the Language and Literature Council, the Fine Arts Council, and the Science and Technology Council.

=== Language and Literature ===
The role of the Language and Literature Council, after its establishment, over time shifted from the academic study of languages and literature towards that of a Language regulator (i.e. the Académie française or the Real Academia Española) for the Amharic language. In light of this, it was re-organised into the National Academy of the Amharic Language in 1972. It was charged with setting the national language policy as to "foster the growth of the Amharic language" and to "encourage the development of its literature". To this end, it designed a programme of spelling reform (albeit unimplemented), published compilations of Ethiopian proverbs (in multiple languages), volumes of translated Ge'ez language poetry, technical and bi-lingual dictionaries, and multiple professional journals.

After the overthrow of the imperial government by the Derg (Coordinating Council of the Armed Forces) in the 1974 coup d'état and the installation of a socialist military government, the Language Academy was seen as a chauvinistic vehicle of linguistic imperialism, and one that favoured of the tongue of the ruling elite at the expense of the country's eight dozen other languages and dialects. As a result, in 1979 it was transformed into the Academy of Ethiopian Languages under the Ministry of Culture and Sport, whose regulatory remit extended to all Ethiopian languages. It had four academic subcommittees: lexicography, linguistics, terminology, and literature - both written and oral (the inclusion of the latter signifying a significant break with the prior emphasis on Ge'ez and its literary tradition).

It continued to operate after the fall of the military regime as an independent organization until 1997, when it became a research body of Addis Ababa University, known as the Ethiopian Languages Research Centre until 2010, when it was restored to the status of an autonomous academy and language regulator and renamed as Academy of Ethiopian Languages and Cultures. In 2013, however, the entirely separate Regional Somali Language Academy, based in Djibouti, was set up by multinational agreement - including Ethiopia - as the international regulator of Somali language.

=== Fine Arts ===
The Fine Arts Council, later the Academy of Fine Arts, counted, among others, Baalu Girma, Afewerk Tekle, and Ashenafi Kebede as members. It had ceased to operate by the time of the fall of the Derg in 1991.

=== Science and Technology ===
The Science and Technology Council, later the Academy of Sciences and Technology, became defunct some time during the rule of the Derg. However, it can be considered to have a partial successor in the form of the Ethiopian Academy of Sciences, which was founded in 2010 following the efforts of academics, such as the historian Bahru Zewde, over several years to establish such an organisation. Its mission was declared as to "advance the development of all the sciences, including the natural sciences, mathematics, the health sciences, agricultural sciences, engineering, social sciences and humanities, fine arts and letters, making its envisioned scope closer to that of the entire Imperial Academy than just the sciences.

== See also ==
- Addis Ababa University
- Haile Selassie I Prize
