= Amharic =

Ethio-Semitic language

- አማርኛ Amarəñña
- Amharic script, fidäl, from Geʽez script
- Pronunciation: [amarɨɲːa]
- Native to: Ethiopia
- Ethnicity: Amhara
- Speakers: L1: 35 million (2020); L2: 25 million (2019) Total: 60 million (2019–2020)
- Language family: Afro-Asiatic: Semitic; West Semitic; South Semitic; Ethiopic; South; Transversal; Amharic–Argobba; Amharic
- Dialects: Gondar; Gojjam; Wollo; Shewa; Addis Ababa
- Writing system: Geʽez script (Amharic abugida); Geʽez Braille
- Signed forms: Signed Amharic

Official status
- Official language in: Ethiopia
- Regulated by: Imperial Academy (former)

Language codes
- ISO 639-1: am
- ISO 639-2: amh
- ISO 639-3: amh
- Glottolog: amha1245
- Linguasphere: 12-ACB-a
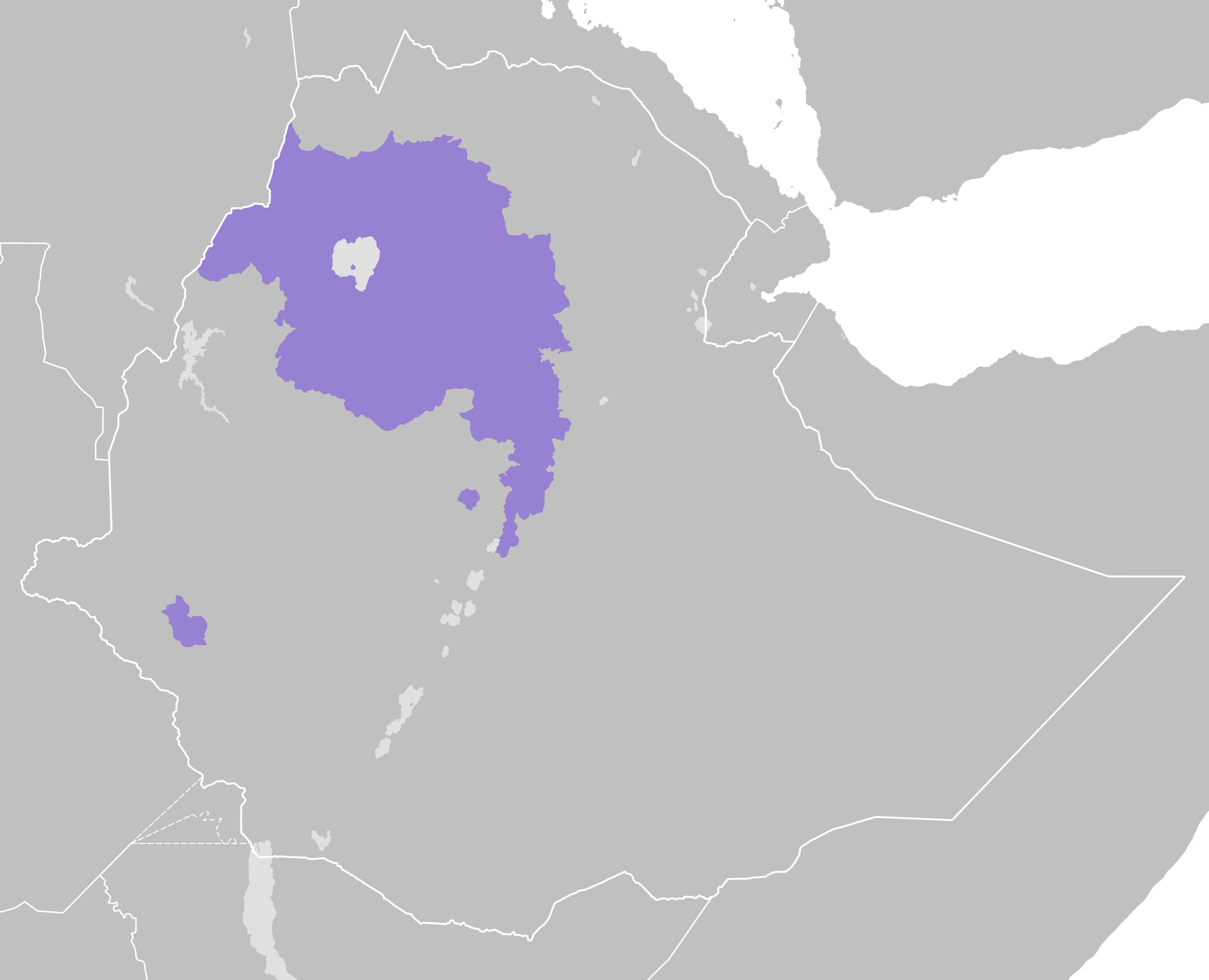
- Distribution of the Amharic language.

Amharic (Note: /æmˈhærɪk/ am-HARR-ik or /ɑːmˈhɑːrɪk/ ahm-HAR-ik; native name: አማርኛ, romanized: Amarəñña, IPA: [amarɨɲːa]) is an Ethio-Semitic language, which is a subgrouping within the Semitic branch of the Afroasiatic languages. It is spoken as a first language by the Habesha Amhara people, and also serves as a lingua franca for all other metropolitan populations in Ethiopia.

The language serves as the official working language of the Ethiopian federal government, and is also the official or working language of several of Ethiopia's federal regions. In 2020 in Ethiopia, it had over 33.7 million mother-tongue speakers of which 31 million are ethnically Amhara, and more than 25.1 million second language speakers in 2019, making the total number of speakers over 58.8 million. Amharic is the largest, most widely spoken language in Ethiopia, and the most spoken mother-tongue in Ethiopia. Amharic is also the second most widely spoken Semitic language in the world (after Arabic).

Amharic is written left-to-right using an extended Geʽez script, known as Ethiopic script or fidäl (ፊደል), meaning 'script, alphabet, letter, character'. The segmental writing system in which consonant-vowel sequences are written as units is called an abugida (አቡጊዳ).

There is no universally agreed-upon Romanization of Amharic into Latin script. The Amharic examples in the sections below use one system that is common among linguists specializing in Ethiopian Semitic languages.

== Dialects ==
Not much has been published about Amharic dialect differences. All dialects are mutually intelligible, but certain minor variations are noted.

=== Jewish Amharic ===
The Beta Israel speak a dialect of Amharic called Jewish Amharic (Hebrew: אמהרית מעוברת) or Judeo-Amharic. It replaced many Christian phrases with Jewish ones. One example is the replacing the phrase "It is good that Mary had pardoned you" with "It is good that God has relieved you peacefully"; these phrases are used to congratulate a mother on successful childbirth. Another example is calling a type of grasshopper "Moses's horses" instead of "Mary's horses". This variety also contains influence from Modern Hebrew due to the large Beta Israel presence in Israel. Currently Jewish Amharic is declining as the Beta Israel gradually abandon Amharic in favor of Hebrew. Most of the Ethiopian Jewish people in Ethiopia and Israel speak Amharic.

== History ==
Amharic has been the official working language of Ethiopia, language of the courts, the language of trade and everyday communications and of the military since the late 12th century. The Amhara nobles supported the Zagwe prince Lalibela in his power struggle against his brothers which led him to make Amharic Lisane Negus (tongue of the king) as well as fill the Amhara nobles in the top positions of his kingdom. The appellation of 'language of the king' (Ge'ez: ልሳነ ነጋሢ, Lǝssanä nägaśi; Amharic: የነጋሢ ቋንቋ, Yä-nägaśi qʷanqʷa) and its use in the royal court are otherwise traced to the Amhara Emperor Yekuno Amlak. Until 2020 Amharic was the sole official language of Ethiopia.

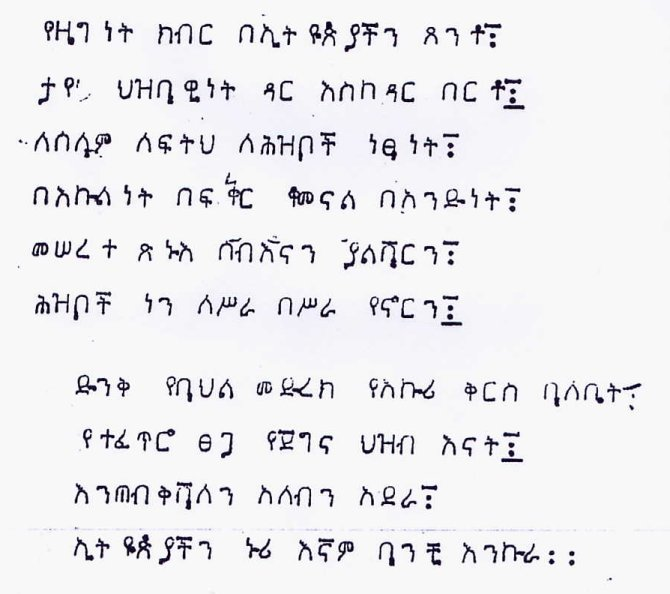
The Ethiopian anthem (since 1992) in Amharic, done on manual typewriter.

=== Linguistic development theory ===
Early Afro-Asiatic populations speaking proto-Semitic, proto-Cushitic and proto-Omotic languages would have diverged by the fourth or fifth millennium BC. Shortly afterwards, the proto-Cushitic and proto-Omotic groups would have settled in the Ethiopian highlands, with the proto-Semitic speakers crossing the Sinai Peninsula into Asia. A later return movement of peoples from South Arabia would have introduced the Semitic languages to Ethiopia. Based on archaeological evidence, the presence of Semitic speakers in the territory date to some time before 500 BC. Linguistic analysis suggests the presence of Semitic languages in Ethiopia as early as 2000 BC. Donald Levine indicates in his work Greater Ethiopia: The Evolution of a Multiethnic Society that by the end of that millennium, the core inhabitants of Greater Ethiopia would have consisted of agropastoralists speaking Afro-Asiatic languages of the Semitic, Cushitic and Omotic branches.

Other scholars such as Messay Kebede and Daniel E. Alemu argue that migration across the Red Sea was defined by reciprocal exchange, if it even occurred at all, and that Ethio-Semitic-speaking ethnic groups should not be characterized as foreign invaders.

Amharic is a South Ethio-Semitic language, along with Gurage, Argobba, Harari, and others. While Tigrinya is 68% similar to Geʽez, the lexical similarity of Amharic to the ancient language is lower at 62%. Due to the social stratification of the time, the Cushitic Agaw adopted the South Ethio-Semitic language and eventually absorbed the Semitic population. Amharic thus developed a larger Cushitic substratum than the more northwardly languages where it also exists such as the Modern South Arabian family, along with the Semitic superstratum. The northernmost South Ethio-Semitic speakers, or the proto-Amhara, remained in constant contact with their North Ethio-Semitic neighbors, evidenced by linguistic analysis and oral traditions. A 7th century southward shift of the center of gravity of the Kingdom of Aksum and the ensuing integration and Christianization of the proto-Amhara also resulted in a high prevalence of Geʽez sourced lexicon in Amharic. Some time after the 9th century AD, Amharic diverged from its closest relative, Argobba, probably due to religious differences as the Argobba adopted Islam.

Amharic is not a descendant of Ge'ez as Ge'ez is part of the North Ethio-Semitic branch while Amharic is a South Ethio-Semitic language.

In 1983, Lionel Bender proposed that Amharic may have been constructed as a pidgin as early as the 4th century AD to enable communication between Aksumite soldiers speaking Semitic, Cushitic, and Omotic languages, but this hypothesis has not garnered widespread acceptance. The preservation in Old Amharic of VSO word order and gutturals typical of Semitic languages, Cushitic influences shared with other Ethio-Semitic languages (especially those of the Southern branch), and the number of geographically distinct Cushitic languages that have influenced Amharic at different points in time support a natural evolution of Amharic from a Proto-Ethio-Semitic language with considerable Cushitic influences (similar to Gurage, Tigrinya, etc.).

Based off Amharic terms loaned into nearby languages, and the distinction between /ʔ/, /ʕ/, /x/, /h/, and /ħ/ in the earliest known written form of the language, pre-17th century Amharic exhibited all the phonemes typical of Semitic languages. Along with that, pre-Gondarine period Amharic was not a rigidly SOV word order language as it is today and a VSO order like that of Geʽez and Classical Arabic was common. During the end of the medieval period a transition from the more Semitic-featured earlier version of the language, along with other sound shifts, to the more innovative modern Amharic took place.

== Phonology ==
Consonants
		Labial	Alveolar	Palatal	Velar	Labio- Velar	Glottal
Nasal		m	n	ɲ			
Plosive/ Affricate	voiceless	p	t	t͡ʃ	k	kʷ	ʔ
Plosive/ Affricate	voiced	b	d	d͡ʒ	ɡ	ɡʷ	
Plosive/ Affricate	ejective	pʼ	tʼ	t͡ʃʼ	kʼ	kʷʼ	
Fricative	voiceless	f	s	ʃ			h
Fricative	voiced		z	ʒ			
Fricative	ejective		sʼ				
Approximant		(β̞)	l	j		w	
Rhotic			ɾ (r)				

The Amharic ejective consonants correspond to the Proto-Semitic "emphatic consonants." In the Ethiopianist tradition they are often transcribed with a dot below the letter.

The vowels of Amharic on a vowel chart. Vowels in parentheses are allophones of /ɨ/ and /ə/.

Vowels
	Front	Central	Back
High	i	ɨ ⟨ə⟩	u
Mid	e	ə ⟨ä⟩	o
Low		a	

The notation of central vowels in the Ethiopianist tradition is shown in angled brackets.

=== Allophones ===
The voiced bilabial plosive /b/ is phonetically realized as a voiced labial approximant [β̞] medially between sonorants in non-geminated form. The fricative ejective /sʼ/ is heard as a fricative ejective [sʼ], but is mostly heard as the affricate sound [t͡sʼ]. The rhotic consonant is realized as a trill when geminated and a tap otherwise. The closed central unrounded vowel ⟨ə⟩ /ɨ/ and mid-central vowel ⟨ä⟩ /ə/ are generally fronted to [ɪ] and [ɛ], respectively, following palatal consonants, and generally retracted and rounded to [ʊ] and [ɔ], respectively, following labialized velar consonants.

==== Examples ====
Geʽez	Romanized	IPA	Gloss
ከበሮ	käbäro	[kəβ̞əɾo]	drum
ብር	bərr	[bɨr]	Ethiopian birr
ይህ	yəh	[jɪh]	this
የማን	yäman	[jɛman]	whose
ውስጥ	wəsṭ	[wʊstʼ]	in
ወንድ	wänd	[wɔnd]	man

=== Stress ===
There is no consensus on stress in Amharic, but initial and heavy or closed syllables tend to attract stress.

== Writing system ==
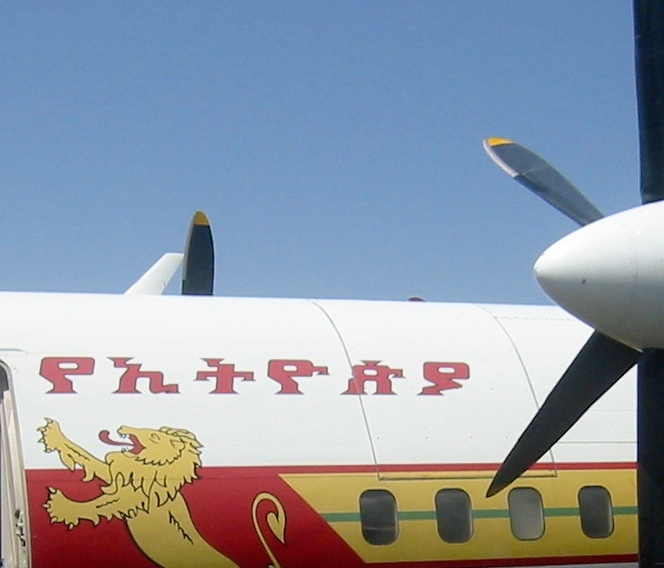
The Ethiopic (or Geʽez) writing system is visible on the side of this Ethiopian Airlines Fokker 50: it reads "Ethiopia's": የኢትዮጵያ ye-ʾityop̣p̣ya.

The Amharic script is an abugida, and the graphemes of the Amharic writing system are called fidäl. It is derived from a modification of the Geʽez script. Each character represents a consonant+vowel sequence, but the basic shape of each character is determined by the consonant, which is modified for the vowel. Some consonant phonemes are written by more than one series of characters: /ʔ/, /s/, /tsʼ/, and /h/ (the last one has four distinct letter forms). This is because these fidäl originally represented distinct sounds, but phonological changes merged them. The citation form for each series is the consonant+ä form, i.e. the first column of the fidäl. There are 34 basic characters, each of which has seven forms depending on which vowel is to be pronounced in the syllable. There are also 49 "wa" letters, which form compound sounds involving "w." All together, the alphabet has some 288 letters. The Amharic script is included in Unicode, and glyphs are included in fonts available with major operating systems.

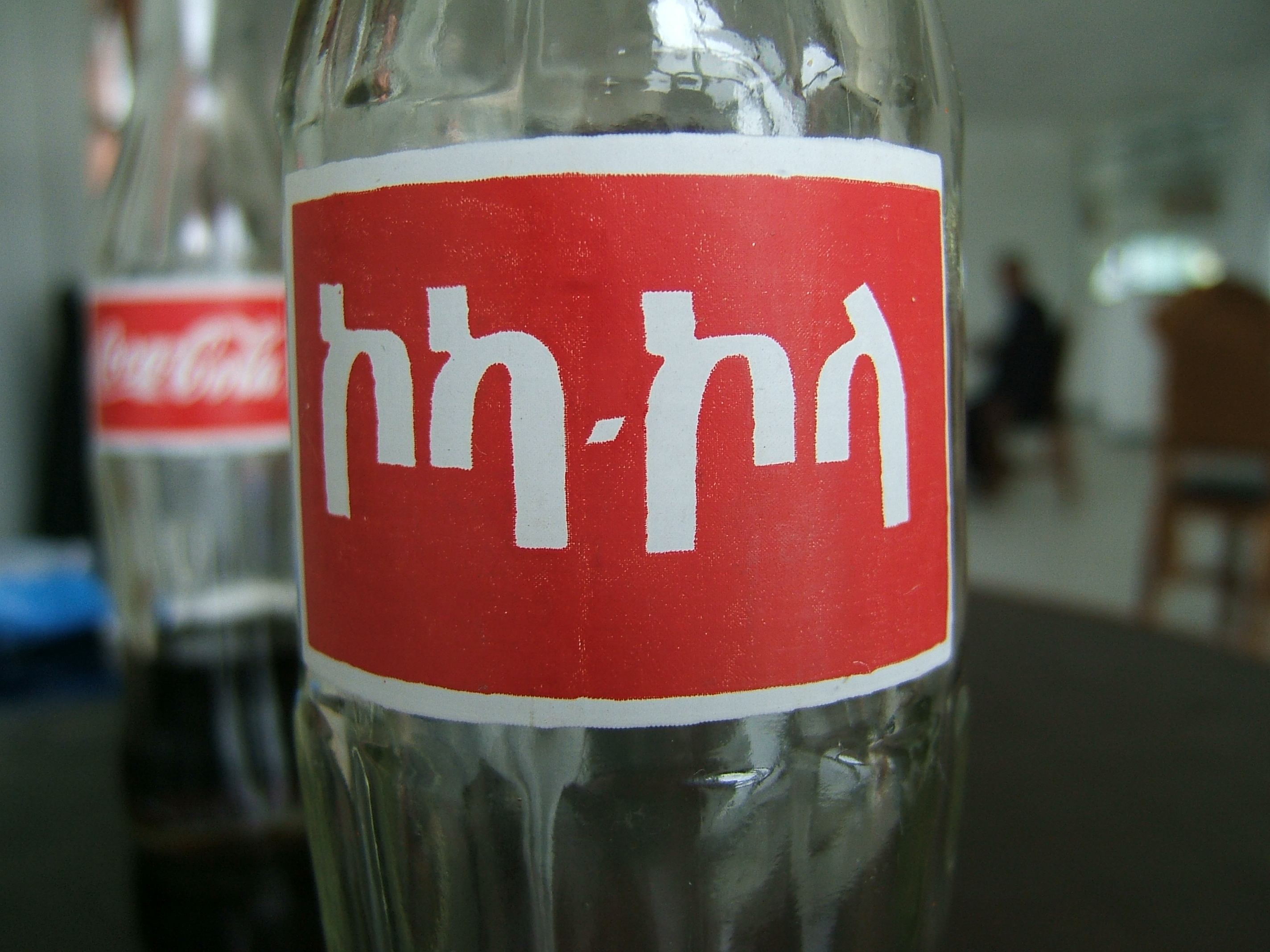
A modern usage of Amharic: the label of a Coca-Cola bottle. The script reads ኮካ-ኮላ (koka-kola).

=== Alphasyllabary ===
Chart of Amharic fidäls
		ä/e [ə]	u [u]	i [i]	a [a]	e/ē [eː]	ə/û [ɨ]	o [o]	wä/we [ʷə]	wi [ʷi]	wa [ʷa]	we/wē [ʷeː]	wə/wû [ʷɨ]
h	[h]	ሀ	ሁ	ሂ	ሃ	ሄ	ህ	ሆ					
l	[l]	ለ	ሉ	ሊ	ላ	ሌ	ል	ሎ			ሏ		
ḥ	[h]	ሐ	ሑ	ሒ	ሓ	ሔ	ሕ	ሖ			ሗ		
m	[m]	መ	ሙ	ሚ	ማ	ሜ	ም	ሞ			ሟ		
ś	[s]	ሠ	ሡ	ሢ	ሣ	ሤ	ሥ	ሦ			ሧ		
r	[r]	ረ	ሩ	ሪ	ራ	ሬ	ር	ሮ			ሯ		
s	[s]	ሰ	ሱ	ሲ	ሳ	ሴ	ስ	ሶ			ሷ		
š	[ʃ]	ሸ	ሹ	ሺ	ሻ	ሼ	ሽ	ሾ			ሿ		
q	[kʼ]	ቀ	ቁ	ቂ	ቃ	ቄ	ቅ	ቆ	ቈ	ቊ	ቋ	ቌ	ቍ
b	[b]	በ	ቡ	ቢ	ባ	ቤ	ብ	ቦ			ቧ		
v	[v] ~ [β]	ቨ	ቩ	ቪ	ቫ	ቬ	ቭ	ቮ			ቯ		
t	[t]	ተ	ቱ	ቲ	ታ	ቴ	ት	ቶ			ቷ		
č	[t͡ʃ]	ቸ	ቹ	ቺ	ቻ	ቼ	ች	ቾ			ቿ		
ḫ	[h]	ኀ	ኁ	ኂ	ኃ	ኄ	ኅ	ኆ	ኈ	ኊ	ኋ	ኌ	ኍ
n	[n]	ነ	ኑ	ኒ	ና	ኔ	ን	ኖ			ኗ		
ñ	[ɲ]	ኘ	ኙ	ኚ	ኛ	ኜ	ኝ	ኞ			ኟ		
ʼ	[ʔ]	አ	ኡ	ኢ	ኣ	ኤ	እ	ኦ			ኧ		
k	[k]	ከ	ኩ	ኪ	ካ	ኬ	ክ	ኮ	ኰ	ኲ	ኳ	ኴ	ኵ
x	[h]	ኸ	ኹ	ኺ	ኻ	ኼ	ኽ	ኾ	ዀ	ዂ	ዃ	ዄ	ዅ
w	[w]	ወ	ዉ	ዊ	ዋ	ዌ	ው	ዎ					
ʽ	[ʔ]	ዐ	ዑ	ዒ	ዓ	ዔ	ዕ	ዖ					
z	[z]	ዘ	ዙ	ዚ	ዛ	ዜ	ዝ	ዞ			ዟ		
ž	[ʒ]	ዠ	ዡ	ዢ	ዣ	ዤ	ዥ	ዦ			ዧ		
y	[j]	የ	ዩ	ዪ	ያ	ዬ	ይ	ዮ					
d	[d]	ደ	ዱ	ዲ	ዳ	ዴ	ድ	ዶ			ዷ		
ǧ	[d͡ʒ]	ጀ	ጁ	ጂ	ጃ	ጄ	ጅ	ጆ			ጇ		
g	[ɡ]	ገ	ጉ	ጊ	ጋ	ጌ	ግ	ጎ	ጐ	ጒ	ጓ	ጔ	ጕ
ṭ	[tʼ]	ጠ	ጡ	ጢ	ጣ	ጤ	ጥ	ጦ			ጧ		
č̣	[t͡ʃʼ]	ጨ	ጩ	ጪ	ጫ	ጬ	ጭ	ጮ			ጯ		
p̣	[pʼ]	ጰ	ጱ	ጲ	ጳ	ጴ	ጵ	ጶ			ጷ		
ṣ	[sʼ] ~ [t͡sʼ]	ጸ	ጹ	ጺ	ጻ	ጼ	ጽ	ጾ			ጿ		
ṣ́	[sʼ] ~ [t͡sʼ]	ፀ	ፁ	ፂ	ፃ	ፄ	ፅ	ፆ					
f	[f] ~ [ɸ]	ፈ	ፉ	ፊ	ፋ	ፌ	ፍ	ፎ			ፏ		
p	[p]	ፐ	ፑ	ፒ	ፓ	ፔ	ፕ	ፖ			ፗ		
		[ə] ä/e	[u] u	[i] i	[a] a	[eː] e/ē	[ɨ] ə/û	[o] o	[ʷə] wä/we	[ʷi] wi	[ʷa] wa	[ʷeː] we/wē	[ʷɨ] wə/wû

=== Gemination ===
As in most other Ethiopian Semitic languages, gemination is contrastive in Amharic. That is, consonant length can distinguish words from one another; for example, alä 'he said', allä 'there is'; yǝmätall 'he hits', yǝmmättall 'he will be hit'. Gemination is not indicated in Amharic orthography, but Amharic readers typically do not find this to be a problem. This property of the writing system is analogous to the vowels of Arabic and Hebrew or the tones of many Bantu languages, which are not normally indicated in writing. Ethiopian novelist Haddis Alemayehu, who was an advocate of Amharic orthography reform, indicated gemination in his novel Love to the Grave by placing a dot above the characters whose consonants were geminated, but this practice is rare.

=== Punctuation ===
Punctuation includes the following:

፠ section mark
፡ word separator
። full stop (period)
፣ comma
፤ semicolon
፥ colon
፦ preface colon (introduces speech from a descriptive prefix)
፧ question mark
፨ paragraph separator

== Grammar ==
Simple Amharic sentences

One may construct simple Amharic sentences by using a subject and a predicate. Here are a few simple sentences:

ኢትዮጵያ አፍሪካ ውስጥ ናት
ʾItyop̣p̣ya ʾAfrika wǝsṭ nat
{Ethiopia} {Africa} {in} {is}
'Ethiopia is in Africa.'

ልጁ ተኝቷል
Lǝǧ-u täññǝtʷall.
{the boy} {asleep is}
'The boy is asleep.' (-u is a definite article. Lǝǧ is 'boy'. Lǝǧu is 'the boy')

አየሩ ደስ ይላል
Ayyäru däss yǝlall.
{the weather} pleasant feels
'The weather feels pleasant.'

እሱ ወደ ከተማ መጣ
ʾƏssu wädä kätäma mäṭṭa
he to city {came}
'He came to the city.'

=== Pronouns ===
==== Personal pronouns ====
Amharic grammar distinguishes person, number, and often gender. This includes personal pronouns such as English I, Amharic እኔ ǝne; English she, Amharic እሷ ǝsswa. As in other Semitic languages, the same distinctions appear in three other places in their grammar.

Subject–verb agreement

All Amharic verbs agree with their subjects; that is, the person, number, and (in the second- and third-person singular) gender of the subject of the verb are marked by suffixes or prefixes on the verb. Because the affixes that signal subject agreement vary greatly with the particular verb tense/aspect/mood, they are normally not considered to be pronouns and are discussed elsewhere in this article under verb conjugation.

Object pronoun suffixes

Amharic verbs often have additional morphology that indicates the person, number, and (second- and third-person singular) gender of the object of the verb.

አልማዝን አየኋት
almazǝn ayyähʷ-at
Almaz-ACC {I saw her}
'I saw Almaz.'

While morphemes such as -at in this example are sometimes described as signaling object agreement, analogous to subject agreement, they are more often thought of as object pronoun suffixes because, unlike the markers of subject agreement, they do not vary significantly with the tense/aspect/mood of the verb. For arguments of the verb other than the subject or the object, there are two separate sets of related suffixes, one with a benefactive meaning (to, for), the other with an adversative or locative meaning (against, to the detriment of, on, at).

ለአልማዝ በሩን ከፈትኩላት
läʾalmaz bärrun käffätku-llat
for-Almaz door-DEF-ACC {I opened for her}
'I opened the door for Almaz.'

በአልማዝ በሩን ዘጋሁባት
bäʾalmaz bärrun zäggahu-bbat
on-Almaz door-DEF-ACC {I closed on her}
'I closed the door on Almaz (to her detriment).'

Morphemes such as -llat and -bbat in these examples will be referred to in this article as prepositional object pronoun suffixes because they correspond to prepositional phrases such as for her and on her, to distinguish them from the direct object pronoun suffixes such as -at 'her'.

Possessive suffixes

Amharic has a further set of morphemes that are suffixed to nouns, signaling possession: ቤት bet 'house', ቤቴ bete, 'my house', ቤቷ; betwa, 'her house'.

In each of these four aspects of the grammar, independent pronouns, subject–verb agreement, object pronoun suffixes, and possessive suffixes, Amharic distinguishes eight combinations of person, number, and gender. For first person, there is a two-way distinction between singular (I) and plural (we), whereas for second and third persons, there is a distinction between singular and plural and within the singular a further distinction between masculine and feminine (you m. sg., you f. sg., you pl., he, she, they).

Amharic is a pro-drop language: neutral sentences in which no element is emphasized normally omit independent pronouns: ኢትዮጵያዊ ነው ʾityop̣p̣yawi näw 'he's Ethiopian', ጋበዝኳት gabbäzkwat 'I invited her'. The Amharic words that translate he, I, and her do not appear in these sentences as independent words. However, in such cases, the person, number, and (second- or third-person singular) gender of the subject and object are marked on the verb. When the subject or object in such sentences is emphasized, an independent pronoun is used: እሱ ኢትዮጵያዊ ነው ǝssu ʾityop̣p̣yawi näw 'he's Ethiopian', እኔ ጋበዝኳት ǝne gabbäzkwat 'I invited her', እሷን ጋበዝኳት ǝsswan gabbäzkwat 'I invited her'.

The table below shows alternatives for many of the forms. The choice depends on what precedes the form in question, usually whether this is a vowel or a consonant, for example, for the first-person singular possessive suffix, ሀገሬ hagär-e 'my country', ገላዬ gäla-ye 'my body'.

Amharic personal pronouns
English	Independent	Object pronoun suffixes			Possessive suffixes
English	Independent	Direct	Prepositional		Possessive suffixes
English	Independent	Direct	Benefactive	Locative/ adversative	Possessive suffixes
I	እኔ ǝne	-(ä/ǝ)ñ	-(ǝ)llǝñ	-(ǝ)bbǝñ	-(y)e
you (m. sg.)	አንተ antä	-(ǝ)h	-(ǝ)llǝh	-(ǝ)bbǝh	-(ǝ)h
you (f. sg.)	አንቺ anči	-(ǝ)š	-(ǝ)llǝš	-(ǝ)bbǝš	-(ǝ)š
you (polite)	እርስዎ ərswo	-(ǝ)wo(t)	-(ǝ)llǝwo(t)	-(ǝ)bbǝwo(t)	-wo
he	እሱ ǝssu	-(ä)w, -t	-(ǝ)llät	-(ǝ)bbät	-(w)u
she	እሷ ǝsswa	-at	-(ǝ)llat	-(ǝ)bbat	-wa
s/he (polite)	እሳቸው ǝssaččäw	-aččäw	-(ǝ)llaččäw	-(ǝ)bbaččäw	-aččäw
we	እኛ ǝñña	-(ä/ǝ)n	-(ǝ)llǝn	-(ǝ)bbǝn	-aččǝn
you (pl.)	እናንተ ǝnnantä	-aččǝhu	-(ǝ)llaččǝhu	-(ǝ)bbaččǝhu	-aččǝhu
they	እነሱ ǝnnässu	-aččäw	-(ǝ)llaččäw	-(ǝ)bbaččäw	-aččäw

Within second- and third-person singular, there are two additional polite independent pronouns, for reference to people to whom the speaker wishes to show respect. This usage is an example of the so-called T–V distinction that is made in many languages. The polite pronouns in Amharic are እርስዎ ǝrswo 'you (sg. polite)'. and እሳቸው ǝssaččäw 's/he (polite)'. Although these forms are singular semantically—they refer to one person—they correspond to third-person plural elsewhere in the grammar, as is common in other T–V systems. For the possessive pronouns, however, the polite 2nd person has the special suffix -wo 'your sg. pol.'

For possessive pronouns ('mine', 'yours', etc.), Amharic adds the independent pronouns to the preposition yä- 'of': የኔ yäne 'mine', ያንተ yantä 'yours m. sg.', ያንቺ yanči 'yours f. sg.', የሷ yässwa 'hers', etc.

==== Reflexive pronouns ====
For reflexive pronouns ('myself', 'yourself', etc.), Amharic adds the possessive suffixes to the noun ራስ ras 'head': ራሴ rase 'myself', ራሷ raswa 'herself', etc.

==== Demonstrative pronouns ====
Like English, Amharic makes a two-way distinction between near ('this, these') and far ('that, those') demonstrative expressions (pronouns, adjectives, adverbs). Besides number, Amharic – unlike English – also distinguishes between the masculine and the feminine genders in the singular.

Amharic demonstrative pronouns
Number, Gender		Near	Far
Singular	Masculine	ይህ yǝh(ǝ)	ያ ya
Singular	Feminine	ይቺ yǝčči, ይህች yǝhǝčč	ያቺ yačči
Plural		እነዚህ ǝnnäzzih	እነዚያ ǝnnäzziya

There are also separate demonstratives for formal reference, comparable to the formal personal pronouns: እኚህ ǝññih 'this, these (formal)' and እኒያ ǝnniya 'that, those (formal)'.

The singular pronouns have combining forms beginning with zz instead of y when they follow a preposition: ስለዚህ sǝläzzih 'because of this; therefore', እንደዚያ ǝndäzziya 'like that'. The plural demonstratives, like the second and third person plural personal pronouns, are formed by adding the plural prefix እነ ǝnnä- to the singular masculine forms.

=== Nouns ===
Amharic nouns can be primary or derived. A noun like ǝgǝr 'foot, leg' is primary, and a noun like ǝgr-äñña 'pedestrian' is a derived noun.

==== Gender ====
Amharic nouns can have a masculine or feminine gender. There are several ways to express gender. An example is the old suffix -t for femininity. This suffix is no longer productive and is limited to certain patterns and some isolated nouns. Nouns and adjectives ending in -awi usually take the suffix -t to form the feminine form, e.g. ityop̣p̣ya-(a)wi 'Ethiopian (m.)' vs. ityop̣p̣ya-wi-t 'Ethiopian (f.)'; sämay-awi 'heavenly (m.)' vs. sämay-awi-t 'heavenly (f.)'. This suffix also occurs in nouns and adjective based on the pattern qǝt(t)ul, e.g. nǝgus 'king' vs. nǝgǝs-t 'queen' and qǝddus 'holy (m.)' vs. qǝddǝs-t 'holy (f.)'.

Some nouns and adjectives take a feminine marker -it: lǝǧ 'child, boy' vs. lǝǧ-it 'girl'; bäg 'sheep, ram' vs. bäg-it 'ewe'; šǝmagǝlle 'senior, elder (m.)' vs. šǝmagǝll-it 'old woman'; ṭoṭa 'monkey' vs. ṭoṭ-it 'monkey (f.)'. Some nouns have this feminine marker without having a masculine opposite, e.g. šärär-it 'spider', azur-it 'whirlpool, eddy'. There are, however, also nouns with the -it suffix that are treated as masculine: säraw-it 'army', nägar-it 'big drum'.

The feminine gender is not only used to indicate biological gender, but may also be used to express smallness, e.g. bet-it-u 'the little house' (lit. house-FEM-DEF). The feminine marker can also serve to express tenderness or sympathy.

==== Specifiers ====
Amharic has special words that can be used to indicate the gender of people and animals. For people, wänd is used for masculinity and set for femininity, e.g. wänd lǝǧ 'boy', set lǝǧ 'girl'; wänd hakim 'physician, doctor (m.)', set hakim 'physician, doctor (f.)'.

For animals, the words täbat, awra, or wänd (less usual) can be used to indicate masculine gender, and anəst or set to indicate feminine gender. Examples: täbat ṭǝǧǧa 'calf (m.)'; awra doro 'cock (rooster)'; set doro 'hen'.

==== Plural ====
The plural suffix -očč is used to express plurality of nouns. Some morphophonological alternations occur depending on the final consonant or vowel. For nouns ending in a consonant, plain -očč is used: bet 'house' becomes bet-očč 'houses'. For nouns ending in a back vowel (-a, -o, -u), the suffix takes the form -ʷočč, e.g. wǝšša 'dog', wǝšša-ʷočč 'dogs'; käbäro 'drum', käbäro-ʷočč 'drums'. Nouns that end in a front vowel pluralize using -ʷočč or -^{y}očč, e.g. ṣähafi 'scholar', ṣähafi-ʷočč or ṣähafi-^{y}očč 'scholars'. Another possibility for nouns ending in a vowel is to delete the vowel and use plain očč, as in wǝšš-očč 'dogs'.

Besides using the normal external plural (-očč), nouns and adjectives can be pluralized by way of reduplicating one of the radicals. For example, wäyzäro 'lady' can take the normal plural, yielding wäyzär-očč, but wäyzazər 'ladies' is also found.

Some kinship-terms have two plural forms with a slightly different meaning. For example, wändǝmm 'brother' can be pluralized as wändǝmm-očč 'brothers' but also as wändǝmmam-ač 'brothers of each other'. Likewise, ǝhǝt 'sister' can be pluralized as ǝhǝt-očč ('sisters'), but also as ǝtǝmm-am-ač 'sisters of each other'.

In compound words, the plural marker is suffixed to the second noun: betä krǝstiyan 'church' (lit. house of Christian) becomes betä krǝstiyan-očč 'churches'.

==== Archaic forms ====
Amsalu Aklilu has pointed out that Amharic has inherited a large number of old plural forms directly from Classical Ethiopic (Geʽez) (Amharic: gǝ'ǝz). There are basically two archaic pluralising strategies, called external and internal plural. The external plural consists of adding the suffix -an (usually masculine) or -at (usually feminine) to the singular form. The internal plural employs vowel quality or apophony to pluralize words, similar to English man vs. men and goose vs. geese. Sometimes combinations of the two systems are found. The archaic plural forms are sometimes used to form new plurals, but this is only considered grammatical in more established cases.

- Examples of the external plural: ምምህር mämhǝr 'teacher', ምምህራን mämhǝr-an; ጠቢብ ṭäbib 'wise person', ተቢባን ṭäbib-an; ካህን kahǝn 'priest', ካህናት kahǝn-at; ቃል qal 'word', ካላት qal-at.
- Examples of the internal plural: ድንግል dǝngǝl 'virgin', ድናግል dänagǝl; ሃገር hagär 'land', ኣህጉር ahǝgur.
- Examples of combined systems: ንጉስ nǝgus 'king', ነገስት nägäs-t; ኮክብ kokäb 'star', ክዋክብት käwakǝb-t; ምጽሓፍ mäṣǝhaf 'book', መጻህፍት mäṣahǝf-t.

==== Definiteness ====
If a noun is definite or specified, this is expressed by a suffix, the article, which is -u or -w for masculine singular nouns and -wa, -itwa or -ätwa for feminine singular nouns. For example:

masculine sg	masculine sg definite	feminine sg	feminine sg definite
ቤት bet house	ቤቱ bet-u the house	ሠራተኛ särratäñña maid	ሠራተኛዋ särratäñña-wa the maid

In singular forms, this article distinguishes between the male and female gender; in plural forms this distinction is absent, and all definites are marked with -u, e.g. bet-očč-u 'the houses', gäräd-očč-u 'the maids'. As in the plural, morphophonological alternations occur depending on the final consonant or vowel.

==== Accusative ====
Amharic has an accusative marker, -(ə)n. Its use is related to the definiteness of the object, thus Amharic shows differential object marking. In general, if the object is definite, possessed, or a proper noun, the accusative must be used, but if the direct object is not determined, the accusative marker is generally not used.

ልጁ ውሻውን አባረረ
lǝǧ-u wǝšša-w-ǝn abbarrär-ä.
child-M.DEF dog-DEF-ACC drove.away-3MS.SUBJ
'The boy drove the dog away.'

ውሻዋ በግ ነከሰች
wǝšša-wa bäg näkkäs-äčč.
dog-F.DEF sheep bit-3FS.SUBJ
'The dog (F) bit a sheep.'

The accusative suffix is usually placed after the first word of the noun phrase:

ይህን ሰዓት ገዛ
Yǝh-ǝn sä'at gäzz-a.
this-ACC watch bought-3MS.SUBJ
'He bought this watch.'

==== Nominalization ====
Amharic has various ways to derive nouns from other words or other nouns. One way of nominalizing consists of a form of vowel agreement (similar vowels on similar places) inside the three-radical structures typical of Semitic languages. For example:

- CəCäC: – ṭǝbäb 'wisdom'; hǝmäm 'sickness'
- CəCCaC-e: – wǝffar-e 'obesity'; č'ǝkkan-e 'cruelty'
- CəCC-ät: – rǝṭb-ät 'moistness'; 'ǝwq-ät 'knowledge'; wəfr-ät 'fatness'.

There are also several nominalising suffixes.

- -ǝnna: – 'relation'; krǝst-ənna 'Christianity'; sənf-ənna 'laziness'; qes-ǝnna 'priesthood'.
- -e, suffixed to place name X, yields 'a person from X': goǧǧam-e 'someone from Gojjam'.
- -äñña and -täñña serve to express profession, or some relationship with the base noun: ǝgr-äñña 'pedestrian' (from ǝgǝr 'foot'); bärr-äñña 'gate-keeper' (from bärr 'gate').
- -ǝnnät and -nnät – '-ness'; ityop̣p̣yawi-nnät 'Ethiopianness'; qǝrb-ənnät 'nearness' (from qǝrb 'near').

=== Copula ===
The copula is expressed by the particle n.

Affirmative copula conjugation
Pronoun	Form
I	ነኝ näññ
you (m. sg.)	ነህ näh
you (f. sg.)	ነሽ näš
you (polite)	ነዎ/ነዎት näwo/näwot
he	ነው näw
she	ናት/ነች nat/näčč
(s)he (polite)	ናቸው naččäw
we	ነን nän
you (pl.)	ናችሁ naččəhu
they	ናቸው naččäw

==== Negative copula ====
The negative copula is formed with አይደለም aydällämm.

Negative copula conjugation
Pronoun	Form
I	አይደለሁም aydällähumm
you (m. sg.)	አይደለህመ aydällähəmm
you (f. sg.)	አይደለሽም aydälläšəmm
you (polite)	አይደሉም aydällumm
he	አይደለም aydällämm
she	አይደለችም aydälläččəmm
(s)he (polite)	አይደሉም aydällumm
we	አይደለንም aydällänəmm
you (pl.)	አይደላችሁም aydällaččəhumm
they	አይደሉም aydällumm

==== Past copula ====
The past copula is expressed by ነበረ näbbärä whose negative is አለነበረም alnäbbärämm.

==== Future copula ====
The future expressed by the imperfect of ሆነ honä, የሆናል yəhonall.

==== Subordinate copula ====
The subordinate copula is expressed by conjugating ሆነ honä orይሆን yəhon for the present and future, and ነበረ näbbärä for the past.

=== Possession ===
Amharic lacks a specific verb ‘to have’. Instead, it uses verbs of existence combined with an object suffix pronoun. For the present, the verb አለ allä ‘there is’ is used. For the past, ነበረ näbbärä ‘there was’ is used, and for the future, the imperfect of ኖረ norä, ይኖራል yənorall is used. Thus, a sentence like አራት፡መጽሐፍ፡አለኝ aratt mäṣhaf alläññ ‘I have four books’ literally translates to ‘four books is-to-me’. Furthermore, since the possessee is the subject, the verb agrees with the possessee rather than the possessor.

=== Verbs ===
==== Verb stems ====
The basic meaning of Amharic verbs are given by its consonants known as 'radicals' with vowels used to express shades of meaning. They can be divided into the following classes: triradicals, biradicals, quadriradicals, and pluriradicals or verbs with more than four radicals.

===== Triradicals =====
Triradicals have three types.

- Type A: ሰበረ säbbärä, characterized by lack of gemination of the 2nd radical in non-perfect forms.
- Type B: ፈለገ fällägä, characterized by gemination of the 2nd radical in all verb forms.
- Type C: ማረከ marräkä, characterized by the vowel a after the 1st radical.

===== Biradicals =====
In biradicals the 2nd consonant is geminated in the perfect if it is the 2nd radical of the root. The only classes to have three types are: ሰማ sämma and ቀረ qärrä. Other biradicals only have one type.

- Type ሰማ sämma:
  - Type A: ሰማ sämma 'to hear'
  - Type B: ጠጣ ṭäṭṭa 'to drink'
  - Type C: ቃጣ qaṭṭa 'to attempt'
- Type ቀረ qärrä:
  - Type A: ቀረ qärrä 'to remain behind'
  - Type B: ለየ läyyä 'to distinguish, separate'
  - Type C: ላጨ lač̣č̣ä 'to shave'

===== Quadriradicals =====
In quadriradicals, the 3rd radical is geminated in the perfect and has two types:

- Type 1: መሰከረ mäsäkkärä 'to testify'
- Type 2: ቀላቀለ qälaqqälä 'to mix', characterized by the vowel a after the 2nd radical.

===== Derived stems =====
Derived stems are formed by either reduplication of the 2nd radical in triradicals, and of the 3rd radical in quadriradicals, or by prefixing morphemes.

==== Conjugation ====
As in other Semitic languages, Amharic verbs use a combination of prefixes and suffixes to indicate the subject, distinguishing three persons, two numbers, and (in the second and third persons singular) two genders.

===== Perfect =====
The perfect is typically used to express the past and formed using suffixes.

Perfect conjugation
Pronoun	Suffix	Example verb ሰበረ säbbärä “to break”
I	-hu, ku	ሰበርሁ/ሰበርኩ säbbärhu/säbbärku
you (m. sg.)	-h, -k	ሰበርህ/ሰበርክ säbbärh/säbbärk
you (f. sg.)	-š	ሰበርሽ säbbärš
he	-ä	ሰበረ säbbärä
she	-äčč	ሰበረች säbbäräčč
we	-(ə)n	ሰበርን säbbärn
you (pl.)	-aččəhu	ሰበራችሁ säbbäraččəhu
they, (s)he (polite), you (polite)	-	ሰበሩ säbbäru

The negative perfect is formed by adding the prefix አል- al- and the suffix -ም -(ə)mm to the affirmative perfect, though the suffix -ም -əm may be omitted in subordinate clauses introduced by a conjunction or relative marker.

====== Simple imperfect ======
The simple imperfect form is used for the present and future in the main negative clause, and both affirmative and negative in subordinate clauses, including the relative clause. It is formed used using a combination of prefixes and suffixes.

Simple imperfect conjugation
Pronoun	Prefix and suffix	Type A Example säb(ə)r	Type B Example fälləg	Type C Example marrək
I	ə-	እሰብር əsäbr	እፈልግ əfälləg	እማርክ əmarrək
you (m. sg.)	tə-	ትሰብር təsäbr	ትፈልግ təfälləg	ትማርክ təmarrək
you (f. sg.)	tə- -i	ትሰብሪ təsäbri	ትፈልጊ təfälləgi	ትማርኪ təmarrəki
he	yə-	ይሰብር yəsäbr	ይፈልግ yəfälləg	ይማርክ yəmarrək
she	tə-	ትሰብር təsäbr	ትፈልግ təfälləg	ትማርክ təmarrək
we	ənnə-/ən-	እንሰብር ənnəsäbr/ənsäbr	እንፈልግ ənnəfälləg/ənfälləg	እንማርክ ənnəmarrək/ənmarrək
you (pl.)	tə- -u	ትሰብሩ təsäbru	ትፈልጉ təfälləgu	ትማርኩ təmarrəku
they, (s)he (polite), you (polite)	yə- -u	ይሰብሩ yəsäbru	ይፈልጉ yəfälləgu	ይማርኩ yəmarrəku

The negative imperfect is formed by adding the prefix አ- a- and the suffix -ም -(ə)mm.

===== Compound imperfect =====
The compound imperfect is used to express the present or future in the main clause and is formed by combining the simple imperfect with the verb አለ allä.

Compound Imperfect conjugation
Pronoun	Prefix and suffix	Example säb(ə)r
I	ə- -allähu	እሰብራለሁ əsäbrallähu
you (m. sg.)	tə- -alläh	ትሰብራለህ təsäbralläh
you (f. sg.)	tə- -iyalläš/-əyalläš	ትሰብሪያለሽ/ትሰብርያለሽ təsäbriyalläš/təsäbrəyalläš
he	yə- -all	ይሰብራል yəsäbrall
she	tə- -alläčč	ትሰብራለች təsäbralläčč
we	ənnə-/ən- -allähu	እንሰብራለን ənnəsäbrallän/ənsäbrallän
you (pl.)	tə- -allaččəhu	ትሰብራለችሁ təsäbralläččəhu
they, (s)he (polite), you (polite)	yə- -allu	ይሰብራሉ yəsäbrallu

===== Jussive =====
The jussive is formed using the same prefixes and suffixes as the imperfect except for the 1st person singular, which uses ል lə-. The 2nd person is only used in the negative jussive which is formed using the prefix አ a-.

Jussive conjugation
Pronoun	Prefix and suffix	Type A Example sbär	Type B Example fälləg	Type C Example mar(ə)k
I	lə-	ልስበር ləsbär	ልፈልግ ləfälləg	ለማርክ ləmark
he	yə-	ይስበር yəsbär	ይፈልግ yəfälləg	ይማርክ yəmark
she	tə-	ትስበር təsbär	ተፈልግ təfälləg	ተማርክ təmark
we	ənnə-/ən-	እንስበር ənnəsbär	እንፈልግ ənnəfälləg	እንማርክ ənnəmark
they, (s)he (polite)	yə- -u	ይበሩ yəsbäru	ይፈልጉ yəfälləgu	ይማርኩ yəmarku

===== Imperative =====
The imperative is used for orders and commands, and only has forms for the second person singular and plural. Negative imperatives are expressed using the negative jussive.

Imperative conjugation
Pronoun	Suffix	Type A Example səbär	Type B Example fälləg	Type C Example mar(ə)k
you (m. sg.)	-	ስበር səbär	ፈልግ fälləg	ማርክ mark
you (f. sg.)	-i	ስበሪ səbäri	ፈልጊ fälləgi	ማርኪ marki
you (pl.)	-u	ስበሩ səbäru	ፈልጉ fälləgu	ማርኩ marku

==== Participles ====
Participles are derived from basic and derived stems. The participle forms of triradicals for type A is ሰባሪ säbari, for type B ፈላጊ fällagi, and for type C ማራኪ maraki .

==== Verbal Nouns ====
The verbal noun of a regular triradical is formed by prefixing መ mä- to the form -ስበር -sbär for type A, -ፈለገ -fällägä for type B, and -ማረከ -marräkä for type C.

==== Gerund ====
Along with the infinitive and the present participle, the gerund is one of three non-finite verb forms. The infinitive is a nominalized verb, the present participle expresses incomplete action, and the gerund expresses completed action, e.g. ali məsa bälto wädä gäbäya hedä 'Ali, having eaten lunch, went to the market'. There are several usages of the gerund depending on its morpho-syntactic features.

===== Verbal use =====
The gerund functions as the head of a subordinate clause (see the example above). There may be more than one gerund in one sentence. The gerund is used to form the following tense forms:

- present perfect nägro -all/näbbär 'He has said'.
- past perfect nägro näbbär 'He had said'.
- possible perfect nägro yǝhonall 'He (probably) has said'.

===== Adverbial use =====
The gerund can be used as an adverb: alfo alfo yǝsǝqall 'From time to time, he laughs'. (From ማለፍ 'to pass')

=== Adjectives ===
Adjectives are words or constructions used to qualify nouns. Adjectives in Amharic can be formed in several ways: they can be based on nominal patterns, or derived from nouns, verbs and other parts of speech. Adjectives can be nominalized by way of suffixing the nominal article (see Nouns above). Amharic has few primary adjectives. Some examples are dägg 'kind, generous', dǝda 'mute, dumb, silent', bič̣a 'yellow'.

==== Nominal patterns ====
CäCCaC – käbbad 'heavy'; läggas 'generous'
CäC(C)iC – räqiq 'fine, subtle'; addis 'new'
CäC(C)aCa – säbara 'broken'; ṭämama 'bent, wrinkled'
CəC(C)əC – bǝlǝh 'intelligent, smart'; dǝbbǝq 'hidden'
CəC(C)uC – kǝbur 'worthy, dignified'; ṭǝqur 'black'; qəddus 'holy'

==== Denominalizing suffixes ====
-äñña – hayl-äñña 'powerful' (from hayl 'power'); ǝwnät-äñña 'true' (from ǝwnät 'truth')
-täñña – aläm-täñña 'secular' (from aläm 'world')
-awi – lǝbb-awi 'intelligent' (from lǝbb 'heart'); mǝdr-awi 'earthly' (from mǝdr 'earth'); haymanot-awi 'religious' (from haymanot 'religion')

==== Prefix yä ====
yä-kätäma 'urban' (lit. 'from the city'); yä-krǝstǝnna 'Christian' (lit. 'of Christianity'); yä-wǝšät 'wrong' (lit. 'of falsehood').

==== Adjective noun complex ====
The adjective and the noun together are called the 'adjective noun complex'. In Amharic, the adjective precedes the noun; e.g. kǝfu geta 'a bad master'; təlləq bet särra (lit. big house he-built) 'he built a big house'.

If the adjective noun complex is definite, the definite article is suffixed to the adjective and not to the noun, e.g. tǝllǝq-u bet (lit. big-def house) 'the big house'. In a possessive construction, the adjective takes the definite article, and the noun takes the pronominal possessive suffix, e.g. tǝllǝq-u bet-e (lit. big-def house-my) 'my big house'.

When enumerating adjectives using -nna 'and', both adjectives take the definite article: qonǧo-wa-nna astäway-wa lǝǧ mäṭṭačč (lit. pretty-def-and intelligent-def girl came) 'the pretty and intelligent girl came'. In the case of an indefinite plural adjective noun complex, the noun is plural and the adjective may be used in singular or in plural form. Thus, 'diligent students' can be rendered tǝgu tämariʷočč (lit. diligent student-PLUR) or təguʷočč tämariʷočč (lit. diligent-PLUR student-PLUR).

== Demographics ==
The 2007 census reported that Amharic was spoken by 21.6 million native speakers in Ethiopia. More recent sources state the number of first-language speakers in 2018 as nearly 32 million, with another 25 million second-language speakers in Ethiopia. Additionally, 3 million emigrants outside of Ethiopia speak the language.

== Literature ==
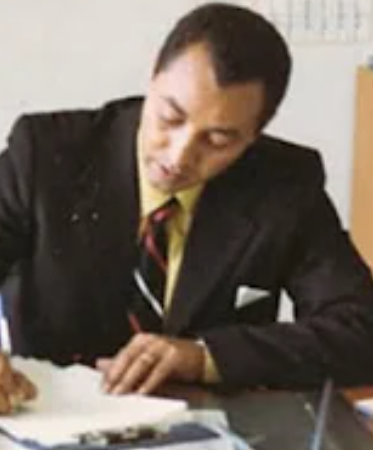
Baalu Girma (1939–1984), regarded as one of the greatest novelists, journalists and critiques in Ethiopia, with which one of his six works such as The End.

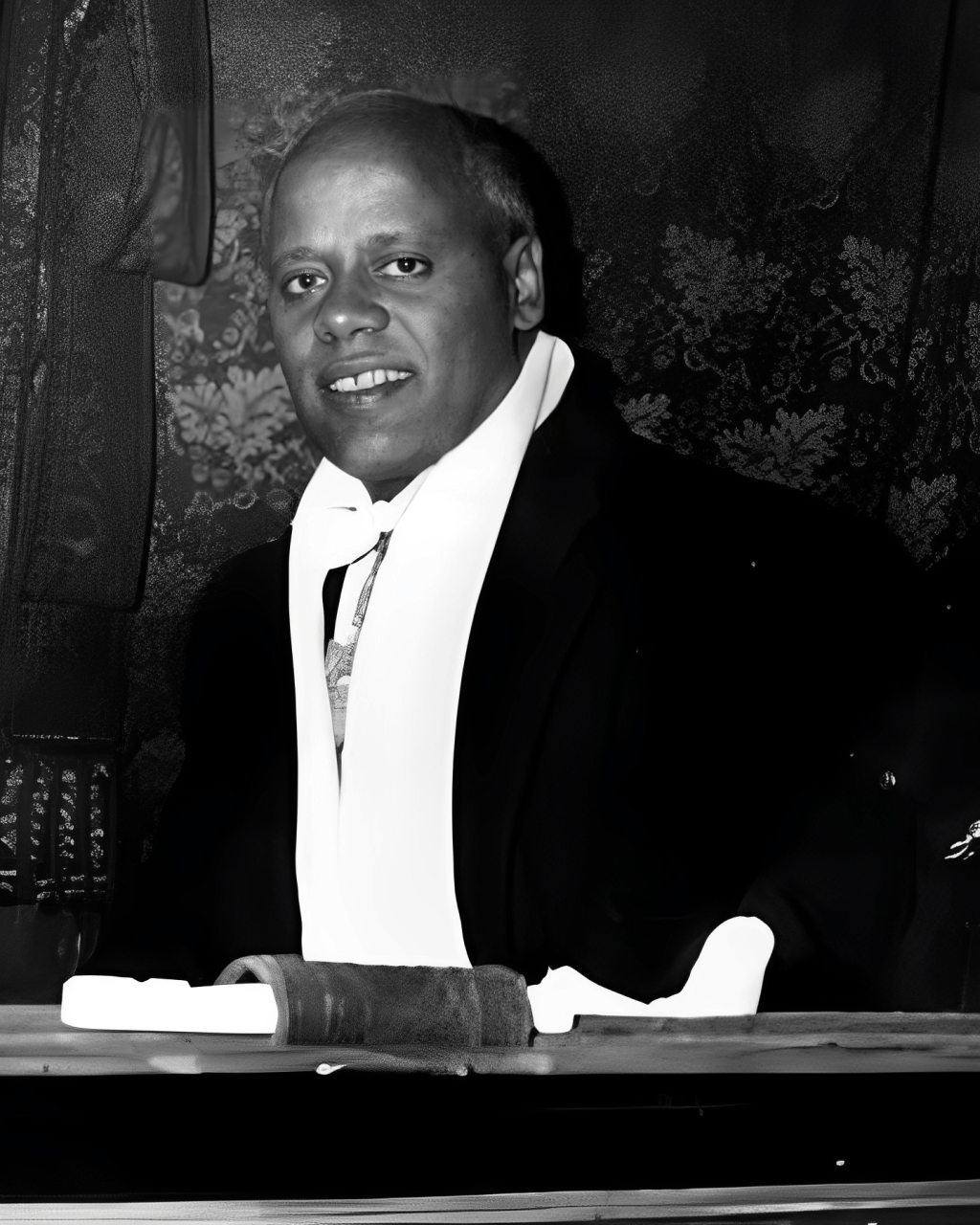
Haddis Alemayehu (1910–2003), foreign minister and novelist, author of Love to the Grave, considered the greatest novel in contemporary Ethiopian literature.

Haddis Alemayehu (1910–2003), foreign minister and novelist, including author of Love to the Grave, considered the greatest novel in Ethiopian literature. The oldest surviving examples of written Amharic date back to the reigns of the 14th century Emperor of Ethiopia Amda Seyon I and his successors, who commissioned a number of poems known as "የወታደሮች መዝሙር" (Soldier songs) glorifying them and their troops. There is a growing body of literature in Amharic in many genres. This literature includes government proclamations and records, educational books, religious material, novels, poetry, proverb collections, dictionaries (monolingual and bilingual), technical manuals, medical topics, etc. The Bible was first translated into Amharic by Abu Rumi in the early 19th century, but other translations of the Bible into Amharic have been done since. The most famous Amharic novel is Fiqir Iske Meqabir (transliterated various ways) by Haddis Alemayehu (1909–2003), translated into English by Sisay Ayenew with the title Love unto Crypt, published in 2005 (ISBN 978-1-4184-9182-6). Others include Baalu Girma, Tsegaye Gabre-Medhin, Kebede Michael.

== Rastafari movement ==
The word Rastafari comes from Ras Täfäri, the pre-regnal title of Haile Selassie, composed of the Amharic words Ras (literally 'Head', an Ethiopian title equivalent to duke) and Haile Selassie's pre-regnal name, Tafari.

Furthermore, Amharic is considered a holy language by the Rastafari religion and is widely used among its followers worldwide. After Haile Selassie's 1966 visit to Jamaica, study circles in Amharic were organized in Jamaica as part of the ongoing exploration of Pan-African identity and culture. Various reggae artists in the 1970s, including Ras Michael, Lincoln Thompson and Misty in Roots, have sung in Amharic, thus bringing the language to a wider audience. The Abyssinians, a reggae group, have also used Amharic, most notably in the song "Satta Massagana". The title was believed to mean 'give thanks'; however, this phrase means 'he thanked' or 'he praised', as säṭṭä means 'he gave', and amässägänä 'thanks, praise'. The correct way to say 'give thanks' in Amharic is one word, misgana. The word satta has become a common expression in the Rastafari dialect of English, Iyaric, meaning 'to sit down and partake'.

== Software ==
Amharic is supported on most major Linux distributions, including Fedora and Ubuntu. Amharic script is included in Unicode, in the Ethiopic block (U+1200 – U+137F). Nyala font is included on Windows 7 (see YouTube video) and Vista (Amharic Language Interface Pack) to display and edit using the Amharic Script. In February 2010, Microsoft released its Windows Vista operating system in Amharic, enabling Amharic speakers to use its operating system in their language.

Google added Amharic to its Language Tools, which allows typing Amharic script online without an Amharic keyboard. Since 2004 Wikipedia has had an Amharic-language Wiki that uses Ethiopic script. There has been some work on building tools for information retrieval in Amharic with some success even before the recent advances in neural processing.

== See also ==
- Help:IPA/Amharic
