= Baalu Girma =

Ethiopian author and journalist (1939–1984)

- በአሉ ግርማ
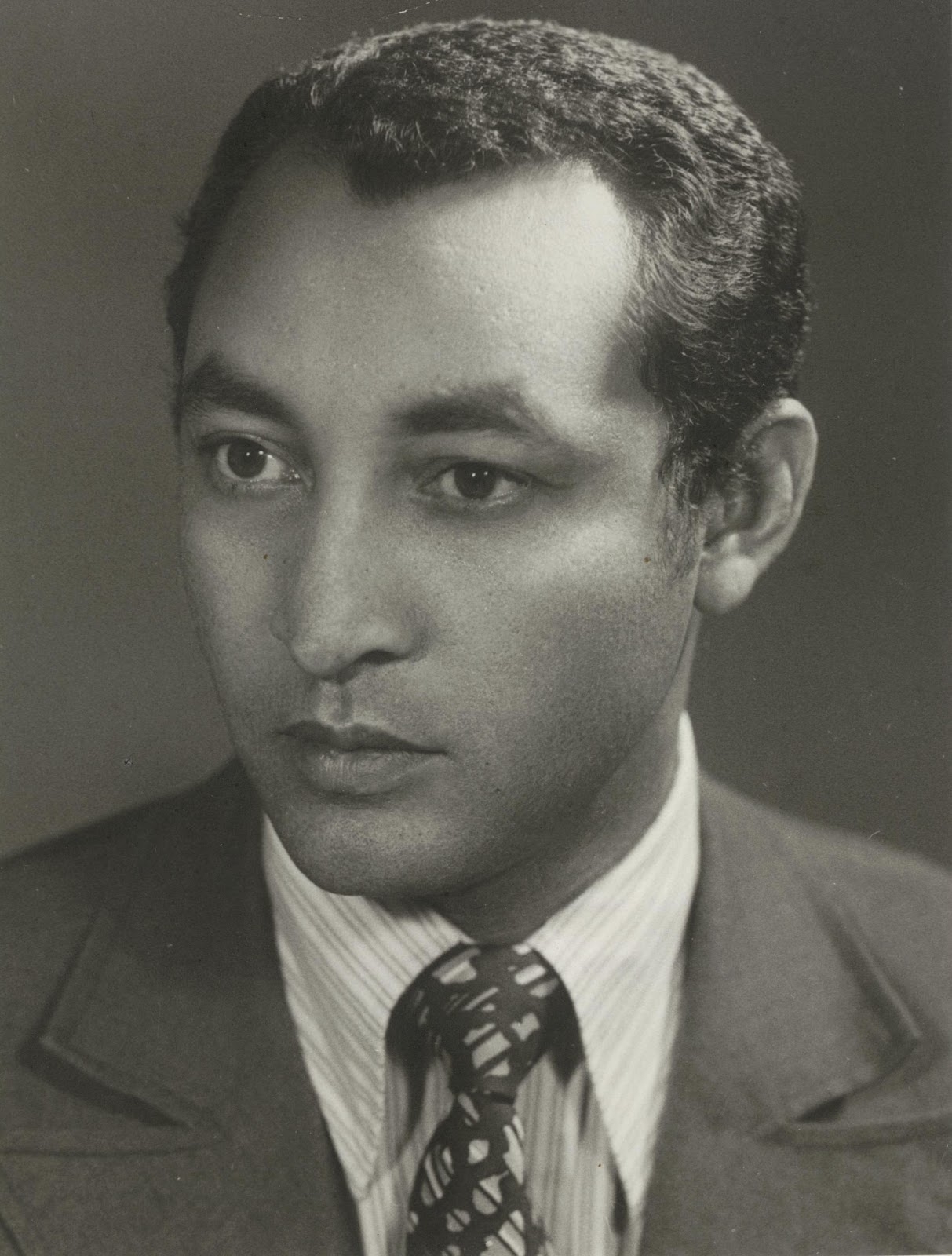
- Born: 22 September 1939; Illubabor Province, Ethiopia
- Died: 1984 (aged 44–45)
- Education: Addis Ababa University (BA); Michigan State University (MD)
- Occupations: Journalist; author
- Spouse: Almaz Aberra
- Children: Meskerem; Zelalem; Kibre
- Writing career
- Years active: 1963–1984
- Period: Modern (20th century)
- Genres: Journalism; opinion journalism; essay; tragedy; romanticism; epistle; literary criticism; oration
- Notable works: Beyond the Horizon; The Bell of Conscience; The Call of the Red Star; Haddis; Oromay
- Movements: Realism, Social realism, Socialist realism
- Baalu Girma's voice Interview to the Ethiopian Television; Recorded 1969–1970

Bealu Girma (Amharic: በአሉ ግርማ, romanized: Be’ālu Girma; 22 September 1939 – 1984) was an Ethiopian journalist and author known for his criticism of prominent members of the Derg in his book Oromay ("The End"). He was a notable journalist during the time of Emperor Haile Selassie I and served in various media positions in the country. Girma also wrote notable works, including Beyond the Horizon, The Bell of Conscience, The Call of the Red Star, and Haddis.

Girma was born to an Indian father from Gujarat and an Ethiopian mother in Illubabor Province, Ethiopia, in 1939, while fascist forces led by the Axis were occupying the country. Nonetheless, Girma's career centered around the capital, Addis Ababa. His writings were influenced by George Orwell, Aldous Huxley, and other critics of government and philosophical positions regarding freedom and natural rights for societies. (Note: In his book Oromay, Baalu is described as having its influences from notable western writers according to Okey Ndibe.)

He also served as acting deputy minister of information and then as minister during Mengistu Haile Mariam's rule. In 1984, Girma disappeared, widely suspected to have been assassinated by the Derg for his critical writings and opposition to the government of Ethiopia at the time.

== Early life ==
Baalu Girma was born on 22 September 1939 in Illubabor Province, Ethiopia. His father was an Indian businessman from Gujarat, and his mother was a local woman from a wealthy family. Although it has not been unequivocally stated, his mother is thought to have Oromo ancestry. His parents' marriage ended when his father decided to move the family to Addis Ababa, a move to which his mother's family objected. After their separation, Baalu's father continued to support him, but Baalu was never able to develop a close relationship with him.

In college, he changed his last name to Girma after being adopted by a family in Addis Ababa who took care of him following his parents' failed marriage. Despite being very close to his maternal grandfather and having fond memories of a particular teacher, Baalu rarely spoke about his childhood in Illubabor. After completing a native Ethiopian-based schooling curriculum, he moved to Addis Ababa at the age of 10 and became a boarding student at Zenebe Worq Elementary School.

Although he showed bright academic motivation and tendencies, he was also known for being a 'troublemaker' before adulthood. He organized a school-wide demonstration to get his way with the school administration. Girma's high grades earned him a scholarship at General Wingate Secondary School in Addis Ababa. In 1951, he entered General Wingate, where he found his calling in journalism and literature. He often thanked his English teacher, Miss Marshall, for inspiring him and teaching him the art of writing succinct sentences, which greatly influenced his path toward journalism and fiction writing.

=== College ===
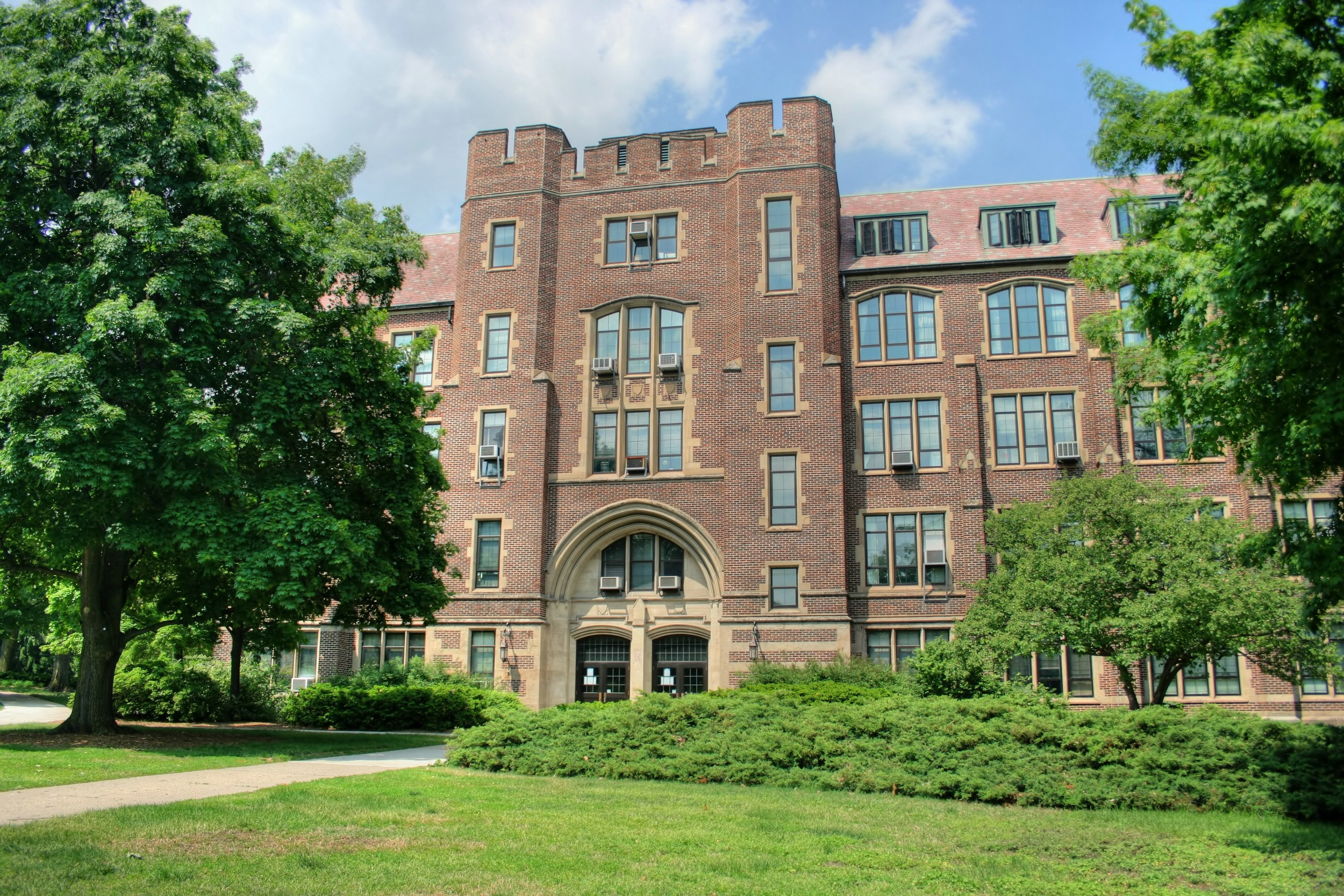
Girma graduated from Michigan State University after studying in Addis Ababa, Ethiopia

In 1962, Girma earned a bachelor's degree in political science and journalism from Addis Ababa University. As an undergraduate, he balanced academic excellence with the practice of journalism. He served as a news correspondent for the Ethiopian Herald, a prominent English-language newspaper, and as editor-in-chief of News and Views, a well-known university newspaper. As a young editor, he was often critical of the emperor's administration and the government's policies, which at times forced him to interrupt his studies and go into hiding. Although the emperor served as head of state, the head of government was the prime minister, and as such, government initiatives and policies were directed by elected members of parliament serving in the cabinet. Girma's critical writings were not solely focused on Emperor Haile Selassie I. Despite these challenges, Girma earned a full scholarship and obtained a master's degree in political science and journalism from Michigan State University in East Lansing, Michigan. (Note: Emperor Haile Selassie I's government was primarily influenced by elected officials, especially since the 1955 Constitution of Ethiopia was approved by parliament. The Prime Minister held vast leverage and control of domestic Ethiopian politics, while Selassie primarily dealt with foreign relations.)

== Professional career ==
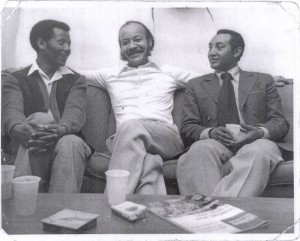
Girma in a discussion in the early beginnings of the 1970s

Late in 1963, Girma returned to Ethiopia and began his career in the Ministry of Information as editor-in-chief of Ye'Zareyitu Ethiopia, a state-owned weekly newspaper published in the Amharic language. The 1960s were a period during which Ethiopian social art and literature flourished, and writers like Girma, Laureate Afewerk Tekele, Gebre Kristos Desta, Mengistu Lemma, and others rose to prominence. In 1965, Girma was appointed editor-in-chief of Addis Reporter, a weekly magazine published in English. After three years, Girma left the Addis Reporter and became editor of the Ethiopian Herald, a daily English-language newspaper. The early stages of his professional life were not without incidents. He was once suspended from his editorial role over a controversial editorial he had written in the Addis Reporter. Later, when he returned to work, he had to accept a salary cut.

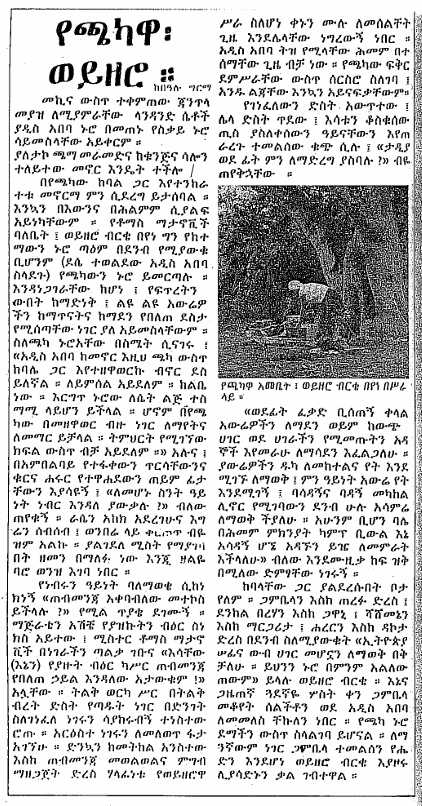
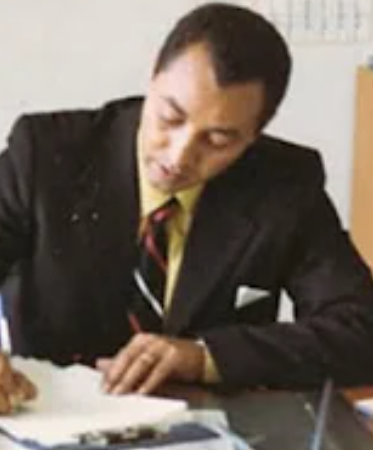
Girma published various papers throughout his years from the 60s to the 80s

From 1970 to 1974, Girma served as editor-in-chief of Addis Zemen, a mainstream daily newspaper published in Amharic. During the country-wide violence and profound political change in 1974, Addis Zemen, under Girma's editorship, remained the only source of information not fully controlled by the government, earning unparalleled public trust for its independent reporting in the interest of the public. He later became the acting, and then deputy, minister of information under Mengistu Haile Mariam, where he showcased his support for Ethiopia's war efforts against Somalia's invasion during the Ogaden War. He wrote the public statements that Mengistu Haile Mariam delivered to the country during his tenure as the leader of the Derg. Although Girma had supported the Derg's war efforts in the northern Ethiopian province in his previous work, The Call of the Red Star, written during his stay in modern-day Eritrea, he was not entirely keen on their policies and later expressed his disapproval through his critical writings. Girma's Oromay was written in response to the 'Red Star' campaign led by the Derg towards modern-day Eritrea.

While he was the editor-in-chief of Addis Zemen, Girma also wrote two of his most popular novels, Kadmas Bashager (Beyond the Horizon) and Ye'hillina Dewel (The Bell of Conscience). Girma is also known for his 1983 Amharic novel Oromay. Despite his previous distribution of Derg propaganda, he eventually chose to critique the regime. This ultimately led to his novels and writings being banned by the Derg for their criticism of communism. Oromay mentioned only a handful of Derg officials directly, with most being alluded to through their actions.

Girma on Ethiopian Television during the end of the 60s

Although his book was banned within five days, it sold over 500 copies in less than 24 hours. These copies were then redistributed and copied by press machines, spreading throughout the country. The Derg regime was unable to successfully hinder the printing of Oromay, and Kuraz Publishing Agency was able to distribute it to large parts of Ethiopia, making it a national hit.

In 1974, Girma left Addis Zemen and became Deputy General Manager of the Ethiopian News Agency, a state-owned media organization. Within a year, he was promoted to General Manager and remained in that post until 1977. At the end of 1977, he became the Permanent Secretary of the Ministry of Information. (Note: The Secretary of the Ministry of Information is the same post as minister, that is to say being Secretary of Information makes one de-facto a minister. Girma has held posts as acting secretary/minister then deputy minister/secretary then finally the chief by becoming the Secretary.) In addition to being a journalist and writer, Girma served as a guest lecturer of creative writing at Addis Ababa University.

Nonetheless, Girma's career came to an end with a highly suspected secret assassination by the Derg, which ultimately led to his death.

== Disappearance and legacy ==
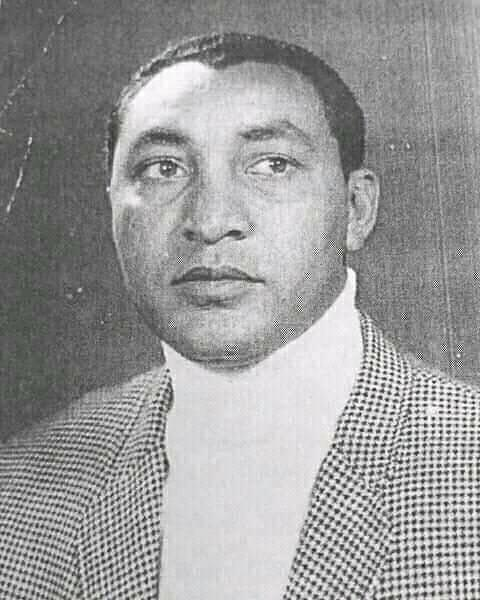
Girma is widely regarded as one of Ethiopia's foremost outspoken writers

=== Disappearance ===
Family members found Baalu Girma's car outside of Addis Ababa on the way to Bishoftu. The military junta classified him as a missing person, and no one has heard from Girma since. Nonetheless, it is widely held that he was murdered by the Derg regime. Mengistu Haile Mariam, the military junta ruler of Ethiopia at the time, claimed to have no information about Girma's whereabouts and stated that he had ordered a search for him, which was unsuccessful. Fikre Selassie Wogderess, who would later become the Prime Minister of Ethiopia, was largely known to be the one who initially censored Baalu Girma's book and was considered by Mengistu Haile Mariam to be one of the key, though not sole, players in Girma's demise. According to Mengistu, Girma's previous promotions by the Derg had caused other employees to become his 'enemies'.

Along with his wife, Almaz Aberra, Girma has a daughter, Meskerem, his sons, Zelalem and Kibre, and his granddaughter, Naomi-Baalu Gizaw. Girma's disappearance has been subject to speculation. His widow, Almaz Aberra, has been waiting for his return for over 30 years, not believing the Derg had killed her husband. She has occasionally expressed her frustration, ultimately believing that he was killed by the Derg during the night of 1984. She became more vocal about her frustration after the overthrow of the Derg and the then-ruling TPLF under the new 1995 constitution and the reformation of a new governmental structure.

=== Legacy ===
Bealu Girma is the most consistently good writer of Ethiopia.

— Reidulf K. Molvaer, Black Lions: The Creative Lives of Modern Ethiopia's Literary Giants and Pioneers, (c. 1997)

Girma's legacy has received overwhelming positive feedback in Ethiopia and has spread across the diaspora, including in places such as Minneapolis, which has a large population of Ethiopian origin. He has also inspired regular recurring theater performances at the Hager Fikir Theatre in Addis Ababa, Ethiopia. Gallery shows have been held in his honor. His book Oromay has recently been translated into English, further extending his influence beyond Ethiopia. (Note: A historical theater play of Baalu Girma's life is performed regularly in Addis Ababa composed by Ethiopian playwriters. Ethiopian Broadcasting Corporation (Ethiopian state media) in addition to EBS and Fana Broadcasting Corporation have both reported this)

Girma is widely recognized in Ethiopian literature as one of the best journalists and writers for his groundbreaking historical book. His work has had a significant impact on Amharic literature.

== See also ==
- List of people who disappeared
