= Berhanu Zerihun =

Ethiopian writer and journalist (1933–34 – 1987)

- Born: 1933/1934; Gondar, Begemder Province, Ethiopian Empire
- Died: 24 April 1987 (aged 53–54)
- Education: Addis Ababa Technical School
- Occupation: Writer
- Years active: 1959–1987

Berhanu Zerihun (Amharic: ብርሃኑ ዘሪሁን; 1933-34 – 24 April 1987) was an Ethiopian writer in Amharic and journalist, noted for his clear and crisp writing style, which contrasted against the more complex writing style popular in his time.

== Early life ==
Born in Gondar the son of an Orthodox Christian Priest, Zerihun Mersa, as a child Berhanu was not interested in sacred texts and devoted much of his spare time to reading new Ethiopian "secular" books. His first poem about a corrupt judge was published in the newspaper Yezareitu Ethiopia. Berhanu enrolled in the Addis Ababa Technical School, alongside his studies, he was an editor of a school magazine and regularly contributed to newspapers.

== Career ==
After graduating in 1956, Berhanu worked for a year as assistant shop master at the Technical School, and subsequently at the Mapping and Geography Institute for two years. He continued writing for newspapers. During Berhanu's career as a journalist, he was a deputy editor of Yezareitu Ethiopia from 1959 until 1961. In 1961 he became editor-in-chief of Voice of Ethiopia, and from 1963 to 1966 editor of Addis Zemen. Berhanu was reinstated as the editor of Addis Zemen after the Ethiopian Revolution. In 1977/8 he was arrested for political reasons, since Addis Zemen did not reflect the political line of the Derg government. After nine months in detention Berhanu was released and appointed editor of the magazine Yekkatit. In 1980, he was appointed editor of the international magazine World Marxist Review.

Berhanu was also a prolific writer. Among his first books were:

- Hulet Yeemba Debdabewoch ("Two Letters of Tears" 1960) a collection of short stories dealing with Ethiopian political themes such as starvation.
- Del Kemot Behuala ("Victory after Death" 1963), which dealt with the Sharpeville massacre in South Africa.
- Yebedel Fetsamie ("The Fulfillment of Crime" 1965) on the subject of prostitution in Ethiopia.
- YeTewodros Enba ("Tewodros's Tears" 1966), a noted work of historical fiction about Emperor Tewodros II which was well received.

Berhanu was most famous for his revolutionary trilogy of novels, Maebel ("The Flood") (Vol. 1, 1974; Vol. 2, 1981; Vol. 3, 1982). It was a political work. The novels depicted the problems of Ethiopian society, the inequities of the old regime, and the prospects of socialist development. All three volumes of Maebel were subsequently read on the radio.

Berhanu also wrote plays, among them "Moresh" (Codename, Password), which was staged by the National Theatre, and "Tatennyaw Tewanay" ("The Troublesome Actor") in 1983.

His last novel, YeTangut Mestir ("Tangut's Secret"), was published in 1987.

== Legacy and death ==
Berhanu began to suffer from health problems in the early 1980s and died on 24 April 1987; he was buried in the Holy Trinity Cathedral in Addis Ababa. Berhanu rejuvenated Ethiopian literature by introducing his own literary style. His literary manner is sometimes referred to as berhanigna, i.e., "the language of Berhanu."

Despite his Marxist ideology, he "wanted to die as an Orthodox Christian" and he never "looked upon Marxism as a form of religion but only a solution for social development"
Quote from Molvaer
