= Yalemtsehay Mekonnen =

Ethiopian physiologist and pharmacologist

- Born: 30 May 1955 (age 71); Asella, Arsi Province, Ethiopia
- Occupations: Physiologist; pharmacologist
- Awards: Fellow of the Ethiopian Academy of Sciences; Fellow of the African Academy of Sciences (2020); TWAS Fellow (2022)

Academic background
- Education: Addis Ababa University; Heidelberg University

Academic work
- Discipline: Pharmacology
- Sub-discipline: Medicinal plants
- Institutions: Addis Ababa University

Yalemtsehay Mekonnen (born 30 May 1955) is an Ethiopian physiologist and pharmacologist who specializes in the use and safety of medicinal plants. In 2009, she became the first woman in Ethiopia to become a full professor. She is Professor of Cell & Human Physiology at Addis Ababa University (AAU).

== Biography ==
Yalemtsehay Mekonnen was born on 30 May 1955 in Asella, Arsi Province. She was educated at Addis Ababa University, where she got her BSc in Biology in 1977 and her MSc in Zoology in 1980, and at Heidelberg University, where she got her PhD in Human Physiology in 1992. She later returned to Addis Ababa University and eventually become full professor in January 2009, becoming the first woman in Ethiopia to do so. She is Professor of Cell & Human Physiology at Addis Ababa University.

Yalemtsehay worked at Martin Luther University Halle-Wittenberg (2001–2002) as a Georg Forster Research Fellow. She served as president of the Biological Society of Ethiopia from 2004 until 2006. She also serves as treasurer and a board member at the Ethiopian Academy of Sciences and as president of the Society of Ethiopian Women in Science & Technology Executive Board. In addition to being head of the Biology Department at AAU, she is also head of the Gender Office at the College of Natural Sciences, saying she began doing so because "as a role model, promoting women is more than close to [her] heart".

As an academic, Yalemtsehay specializes in the use and safety of medicinal plants.

Yalemtsehay was awarded the Regional African Union Kwame Nkrumah Award for Scientific Excellence for the Eastern region in 2015. She was elected a TWAS Fellow in 2022, and Fellow of the African Academy of Sciences in 2020. She is a Fellow of the Ethiopian Academy of Sciences.

She is married with two children.
