= Linguistic description =

Work of objectively describing language use

In the study of language, description or descriptive linguistics is the work of objectively analyzing and describing how language is actually used (or how it was used in the past) by a speech community.

All academic research in linguistics is descriptive; like all other scientific disciplines, it aims to describe reality, without the bias of preconceived ideas about how it ought to be. Modern descriptive linguistics is based on a structural approach to language, as exemplified in the work of Leonard Bloomfield and others. This type of linguistics utilizes different methods in order to describe a language such as basic data collection, and different types of elicitation methods.

== Descriptive versus prescriptive linguistics ==
Linguistic description, as used in academic and professional linguistics, is often contrasted with linguistic prescription, which is found especially in general education, language arts instruction, and the publishing industry.

As an English-linguist Larry Andrews describes it, descriptive grammar is the linguistic approach which studies what a language is like, as opposed to prescriptive, which declares what a language should be like. In other words, descriptive grammarians focus analysis on how all kinds of people in all sorts of environments, usually in more casual, everyday settings, communicate, whereas prescriptive grammarians focus on the grammatical rules and structures predetermined by linguistic registers and figures of power. Andrews also believes that, although most linguists would be descriptive grammarians, most public school teachers tend to be prescriptive.

Webster's Third New International Dictionary was the subject of controversy over its use of linguistic description. It included words, pronunciations, and meanings that previous dictionaries would omit. It also labeled words such as ain't as "nonstandard," while older, prescriptive dictionaries may use terms such as "improper," "incorrect," or even "illiterate." This descriptive approach, while common in sociolinguistics, was seen as overly permissive by many who felt dictionaries ought to approach language prescriptively.

== History of the discipline ==
The earliest known descriptive linguistic work took place in a Sanskrit community in northern India; the most well-known scholar of that linguistic tradition was Pāṇini, whose works are commonly dated to around the 5th century BCE. Philological traditions later arose around the description of Greek, Latin, Chinese, Tamil, Hebrew, and Arabic. The description of modern European languages did not begin before the Renaissance – e.g. Spanish in 1492, French in 1532, English in 1586; the same period saw the first grammatical descriptions of Nahuatl (1547) or Quechua (1560) in the New World, followed by numerous others.

Even though more and more languages were discovered, the full diversity of language was not yet fully recognized. For centuries, language descriptions tended to use grammatical categories that existed for languages considered to be more prestigious, like Latin.

Linguistic description as a discipline really took off at the end of the 19th century, with the Structuralist revolution (from Ferdinand de Saussure to Leonard Bloomfield), and the notion that every language forms a unique symbolic system, different from other languages, worthy of being described "in its own terms".

== Methods ==
The first critical step of language description is to collect data. To do this, a researcher does fieldwork in a speech community of their choice, and they record samples from different speakers. The data they collect often comes from different kinds of speech genres that include narratives, daily conversations, poetry, songs and many others. While speech that comes naturally is preferred, researchers use elicitation, by asking speakers for translations, grammar rules, pronunciation, or by testing sentences using substitution frames. Substitution frames are pre-made sentences put together by the researcher that are like fill in the blanks. They do this with nouns and verbs to see how the structure of the sentence might change or how the noun and verb might change in structure.

There are different types of elicitation used in the fieldwork for linguistic description. These include schedule controlled elicitation, and analysis controlled elicitation, each with their own sub branches. Schedule controlled elicitation is when the researcher has a questionnaire of material to elicit to individuals and asks the questions in a certain order according to a schedule. These types of schedules and questionnaires usually focus on language families, and are typically flexible and are able to be changed if need be. The other type of elicitation is analysis controlled elicitation which is elicitation that is not under a schedule. The analysis of the language here in fact controls the elicitation. There are many sub types of analysis controlled elicitation, such as target language interrogation elicitation, stimulus driven elicitation, and many other types of elicitation. Target language interrogation elicitation is when the researcher asks individuals questions in the target language, and the researcher records all the different answers from all the individuals and compares them. Stimulus driven elicitation is when a researcher provides pictures, objects or video clips to the language speakers and asks them to describe the items presented to them. These types of elicitation help the researcher build a vocabulary, and basic grammatical structures.

This process is long and tedious and spans over several years. This long process ends with a corpus, which is a body of reference materials, that can be used to test hypothesis regarding the language in question.

== Challenges ==
Almost all linguistic theory has its origin in practical problems of descriptive linguistics. Phonology (and its theoretical developments, such as the phoneme) deals with the function and interpretation of sound in language. Syntax has developed to describe how words relate to each other in order to form sentences. Lexicology collects words as well as their derivations and transformations: it has not given rise to much generalized theory.

Linguistic description might aim to achieve one or more of the following goals:

1. A description of the phonology of the language in question.
2. A description of the morphology of words belonging to that language.
3. A description of the syntax of well-formed sentences of that language.
4. A description of lexical derivation.
5. A documentation of the vocabulary, including at least one thousand entries.
6. A reproduction of a few genuine texts.

== See also ==
- African-American Vernacular English and social context
- GOLD (ontology)
- Grammatical gender
- Language documentation
- Linguistic relativity
- Linguistic typology
- Mondegreen
- Text linguistics

== Bibliography ==
- Ameka, Felix K.; Alan Charles Dench; Nicholas Evans (2006). Catching language: the standing challenge of grammar writing. Walter de Gruyter. p. 662. ISBN 3-11-018603-9.
- Chelliah, Shobhana L.; de Reuse, Willem J. (2011). Handbook of Descriptive Linguistic Fieldwork. doi:10.1007/978-90-481-9026-3. ISBN 978-90-481-9025-6.
- François, Alexandre; Ponsonnet, Maïa (2013). "Descriptive linguistics" (PDF). In Jon R. McGee; Richard L. Warms (eds.). Theory in Social and Cultural Anthropology: An Encyclopedia. Vol. 1. SAGE Publications, Inc. pp. 184–187. ISBN 9781412999632.
- Haviland, William A. (2005). Cultural Anthropology: The Human Challenge. Thomson Wadsworth. ISBN 978-0534624873
- Renouf, Antoinette & Andrew Kehoe (2006). The Changing Face of Corpus Linguistics 408 pp. p. 377.
