= Yimtubezinash Woldeamanuel =

Ethiopian physician and microbiologist

- Education: Addis Ababa University
- Awards: Aklilu Lemma Research Grant for the Academic year 1997/1998 by the Aklilu Lemma fund for scholarships and research grants. Grantee of the grant from SIDA/MSB (Swedish Civil Contingencies Agency) for the research project “ Health care associated Infections in TAH” Grantee of the Swedish Research Links programme 2011 grant, for the research project “ Health care associated Infections in TAH”
- Scientific career
- Fields: Medical Microbiology
- Workplaces: Addis Ababa University

Yimtubezinash Woldeamanuel Mulate is an Ethiopian physician and microbiologist researching infectious diseases, hospital-acquired infections, and antimicrobial resistance. She is a professor of medical microbiology at Addis Ababa University.

== Life ==
Woldeamanuel completed a M.Sc. and Ph.D. in medical microbiology and a M.D. at the Addis Ababa University (AAU). Woldeamanuel joined the faculty of AAU in 1997. She is a professor of medical microbiology. She heads the Department of Microbiology, Immunology, and Parasitology in the School of Medicine at AAU. Woldeamanuel researches infectious diseases, hospital-acquired infections, antimicrobial resistance and multiple drug resistance. She investigates pathogens including MRSA, ESBL, VRE, and MDR-TB. Woldeamanuel is a Fellow of the Ethiopian Academy of Sciences.
