= Educational crisis in Ethiopia since 2020 =

Ongoing phenomenon

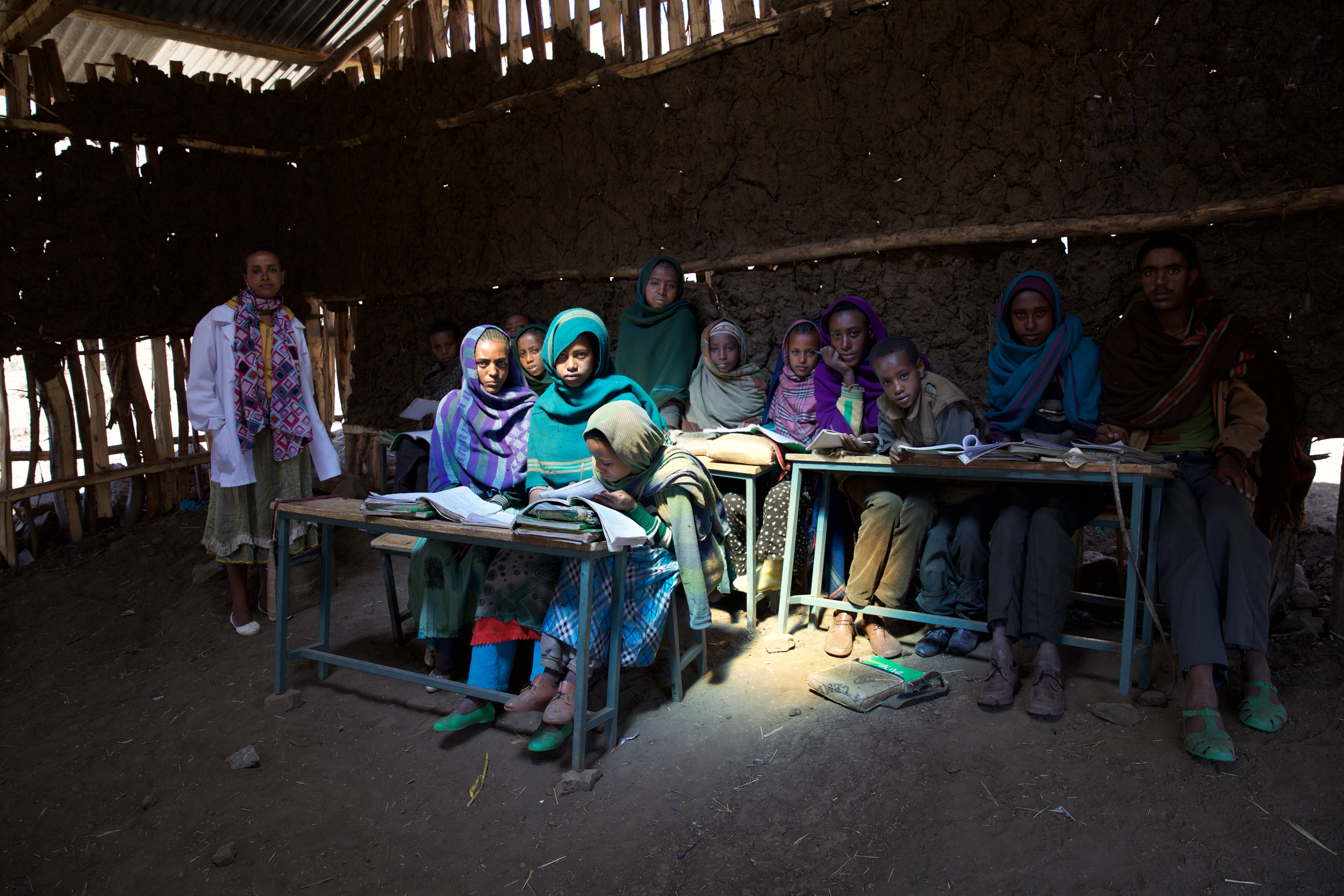
School in Semien Mountains

Although the Ethiopian education system historically was in a state of crisis for a long time, a major educational setback has been documented by numerous sources since the beginning of the COVID-19 pandemic and civil conflict in the country.

== Educational failure ==
Like other poor African countries, the education quality of Ethiopia saw a large decline due to the COVID-19 pandemic as well as due to civil war in the country. During the Tigray War, eight thousand schools have been damaged, looted and destroyed since 2021, restricting the right of children to access education. Data from December 2022 indicated that 3.5 million children do not access free education due to war and climate change. Moreover, as many as 2.3 million school-aged children and 1.7 million children are not attending school in Tigray as a result of loss of infrastructure. According to the 2022 UNICEF report, about 3.1 to 3.6 million children are out of school, one of the largest educational crises in the world.

Ethiopian education has been improving over the past decade, with nearly 30 million students entering primary and secondary education and over 130,000 students entering higher education. Policy experts, researchers and longtime observers believed that the current crisis can lead to problems beyond individual student performance. Students are more inclined to acquire scholarship in international higher education institutions for better quality of education and stability. There is also concern that students are frustrated by rigorous admission criteria for universities and requiring exit exam for acquiring degree after their study.

== National exam failure ==
Since 2021, the Ethiopian National Exam quality was under worsening conditions, where almost 97% of students failed to pass the grade 12 "entrance exams". In October 2023, the Minister of Education Berhanu Nega disclosed the catastrophic failure of student in national exam. Only 3.3% of students who took exam in 2022 scored 50% and above, which was the minimum requirement of to enroll in higher education. In 2023, 43% of schools reported that none of their students passed the grade 12 secondary school exams, and 3.2% of the 845,099 students who took the exam achieved a passing score in 2023.
