= Haddis =

1984 novel by Baalu Girma

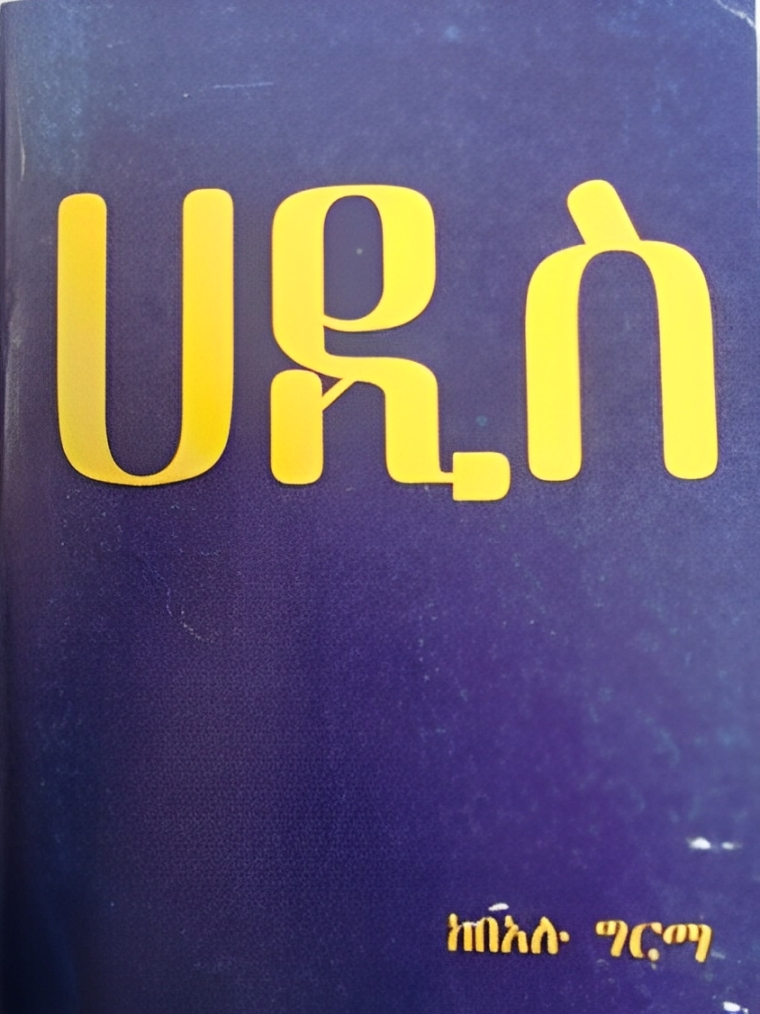
- Author: Baalu Girma
- Language: Amharic
- Genre: Historical fiction
- Publisher: Kuraz Publishing Agency
- Publication date: 1984
- Publication place: Ethiopia
- Pages: 250
- OCLC: 24290346
- Preceded by: Oromay

Haddis (Amharic: ሀዲስ, pronounced [hɑd.dɪs]) is a novel by Ethiopian author Baalu Girma. The novel was released the Derg rule. After the overthrew of Emperor Haile Selassie I, which Girma worked at originally. The new Derg led government shifting Ethiopia in a war zone. The novel comes chronologically after Oromay, the book which is widely suspected to have killed Girma after criticizing the-then government of Ethiopia.

== Plot ==
The setting of the novel is in 20th century Ethiopia and as such documents political upheavals and tensions arising over the country. Haddis, the protagonist dealing with the surrounding chaos manages his journey across the vast expanse.
