= Lucien Matte =

Canadian Jesuit priest (1907–1973)

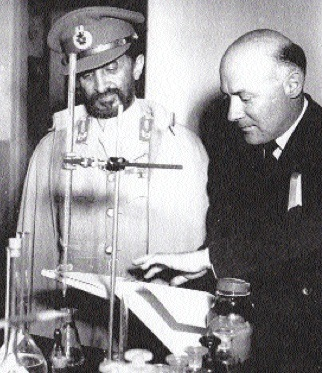
Lucien Matte (right) with Emperor Haile Selassie.

Lucien Matte SJ (1907–1973) was a Canadian Jesuit priest and educator. He was President of the University of Sudbury and founder and president of the Addis Ababa University.

In 1946, Emperor Haile Selassie, who favoured the Jesuit educational philosophy, asked Matte to help organize the country's educational system. The emperor followed this in 1950 with a request that Matte help establish a university. This was known as the University College of Addis Ababa (now Addis Ababa University) and Matte served as President from 1952 to 1962. He then served as president of the University of Sudbury from 1962 to 1966.
