= Masresha Fetene =

Ethiopian professor of Plant Ecophysiologist (1954-)

Professor Masresha Fetene FAAS
- ማስረሻ ፈጠነ
- Born: 15 December 1954 (age 71); Amhara Region, Ethiopia
- Education: Addis Ababa University (BSc, MSc); Technische Universität Darmstadt (PhD)
- Scientific career
- Fields: Stress (biology); Photosynthesis; Ecophysiology
- Workplaces: University of Bayreuth; Addis Ababa University
- Thesis: Comparative environmental physiology of crassulacean acid metabolism in a terrestrial bromeliad, Bromelia humilis Jacq. and a highland Kalanchoë, Kalanchoë petitiana A. Rich (1990)

Masresha Fetene FAAS (Amharic: ማስረሻ ፈጠነ, born 15 December 1954) is an Ethiopian professor of Plant Ecophysiology at the Department of Plant Biology and Biodiversity Management, Addis Ababa University.

== Early life and education ==
Masresha Fetene was born in Mertolemariam, Gojjam, Amhara Region, Ethiopia on 15 December 1954.

He obtained a Bachelor of Science in Biology from the Department of Biology, Addis Ababa University (1976–1982) with a distinction, followed by a Master of Science from the same institute (1983–1985). He then completed a PhD in Plant Ecophysiology (1987–1990) from the Institute of Botany, Technische Universität Darmstadt, Germany, on German Academic Exchange Service (DAAD) PhD Fellowship, before becoming a Research Assistant until 1992 at the University of Bayreuth on a Research Fellowship funded by German research Foundation.

== Career and research ==
Fetene returned to Ethiopia to join the Department of Biology, Addis Ababa University, as an Assistant Professor (1993–1996), before being promoted to an Associate Professor and Head of the Department (1996–2002), and a Professor of Ecophysiologist in 2002. He was the Director and General Editor of Addis Ababa University Press (2006–2011), and the Associate Dean (2001–2004) and Vice President (2009–2013) of the Research and Graduate Studies, Faculty of Science, Addis Ababa University. Between 1996 and 2004, Fetene was the Editor-in-Chief of SINET: Ethiopian Journal of Science, a journal published by the Faculty of Science, Addis Ababa University since 1971.

Fetene research and policies focuses on Biodiversity, Stress (biology), photosynthesis and ecophysiology. He obtained the International Professional Certificate of STI Policy Management from the International Science, Technology and Innovation Center for South-South Cooperation, UNESCO. Fetene visited the Scientific Advisory Board, Umeå University on a Summer Research Fellowship in 2006.

Fetene was key in the formation of the Ethiopian Academy of Sciences on April 10, 2010, and he serves as the Executive Director since 2014. Fetene was appointed as a member of the National Council for Science, Ethiopia, in 2015. He co-founded the African Forestry Network, the Ethiopian Institute of Water Resources, and the Biological Society of Ethiopia.

== Personal life ==
Fetene is married to Selome Bekele, a Lecturer at the Addis Ababa University, and they have 3 children.

== Awards and recognitions ==
Fetene is a Founding Fellow of the Ethiopian Academy of Sciences in 2010, and was elected a Fellow of the African Academy of Sciences in 2015. In 2016, Fetene received UNESCO-ICRO – Short-term Research Fellowship Award in 1994, Alexander von Humboldt Foundation's Research Fellowship in 2000, and a DAAD Summer Research Fellowship in 1994 and 2003.

== Selected publications ==
- Birhane, E., FJ Sterck, M Fetene, F Bongers, TW Kuyper (2012). Arbuscular mycorrhizal fungi enhance photosynthesis, water use efficiency, and growth of frankincense seedlings under pulsed water availability conditions. Oecologia, 169: 895-904.
- Tesfaye G, Teketay, D., Fetene M., Beck, E. (2010). Regeneration of seven indigenous tree species in a dry Afromontane forest, southern Ethiopia. Flora: Plant Morphology, Distribution and Functional Ecology 205: 135-143.
- Getachew Tesfaye, Demel Teketay, Masresha Fetene (2002/1/1). Regeneration of fourteen tree species in Harenna forest, southeastern Ethiopia. Flora-Morphology, Distribution, Functional Ecology of Plants 197: 461-474.
- Aster Gebrekirstos, Demel Teketay, Masresha Fetene, Ralph Mitlohner (2006). Adaptation of five co-occurring tree and shrub species to water stress and its implication in restoration of degraded lands. Forest Ecology and Management 229:259–267.
