= Oromay =

1983 novel by Baalu Girma

- Author: Baalu Girma
- Language: Amharic language
- Publisher: Kuraz Publishing Agency
- Publication date: 1983
- Publication place: Ethiopia

Oromay (Eritrean language: ፍሬ አልባ, "pointless", borrowed from the Italian oramai) is an Amharic-language novel, published in 1983. It was written by Baalu Girma. The novel presents a cynical account on the Red Star Campaign of the Derg military junta. The book was published by the Kuraz Publishing Agency in Addis Ababa. In spite of a government ban on the book, it became widely read and famous. According to Ruth Iyob, the book presents "an accurate and compelling account of the events surrounding the failure of this campaign".

The Red Star Campaign had been declared by Colonel Mengistu Haile Mariam in a speech in Asmara on January 25, 1982. In his speech Mengistu called for the crushing of "secessionist bandits", i.e. the EPLF guerrilla in Eritrea, the TPLF in Tigray and the EPRP and EDU in Gondar. The campaign was supposed to focus both on military means as well as supporting reconstruction in the affected areas. The Commission for Organizing the Party of the Working People of Ethiopia was assigned the task of leading the campaign. The government sent some 120,000 troops to participate in the campaign, making it the largest military offensive of the Derg in the Eritrean war. The author Baalu Girma, had been invited by Mengistu to work as propaganda chief in the Red Star Campaign. He had assumed the position believing in the goals of the campaign. However, he came to feel that the ideals of the campaign had been corrupted by militaristic mindsets. Once the campaign had been abruptly called off, Baalu Girma began writing Oromay based on the events of the campaign. While the official propaganda lauded the Red Star Campaign as a success, Baalu Girma considered it a failure. He stayed behind in Eritrea during this period. Oromay is a love story set in Asmara in the midst of the conflict.

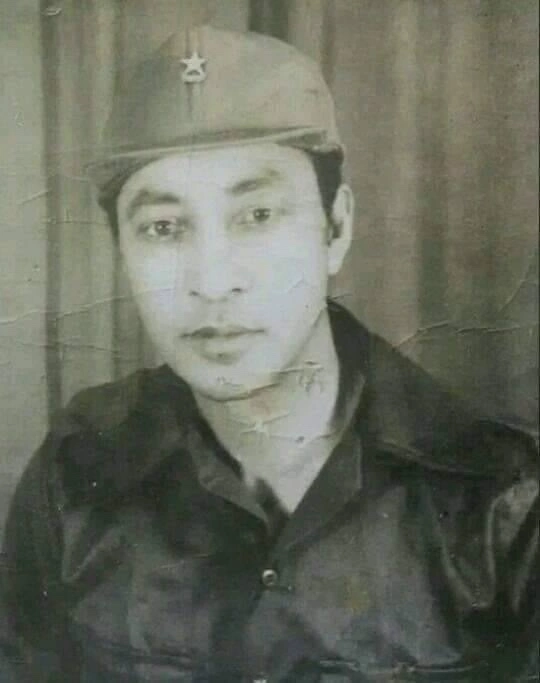
Girma pictured during the Derg rule

Baalu Girma changed the names of real-life Derg officials. Dawit Wolde Giorgis, then the head of COPWE in Asmara is depicted in the book as the character "Solomon Betre-Giorgis". Other real-life Derg officials depicted in the novel are Fisaha Geda (as Tedla Regassa, Chief of Protocol), Tesfaye Wolde-Selassie (as Betru Tesema) and Fasika Sidelel (as Mashafe Daniel). These were figures that Baalu Girma knew personally. According to Dawit Woldis-Giorgis it was obvious whom the fictional characters depicted.

The Derg government is illustrated as corrupt and inefficient in the novel. However, the bulk of the book is dedicated to accounts of the war in Eritrea. In Oromay accounts of massacres and rapes committed by government militias in Eritrean villages are presented, as a consequence of the discourse equating all Eritreans with rebels. The book also deals with the real-world rumour that Tekle Gebre Mariam, an EPLF leader that had defected to the Derg, had been an EPLF double-agent.

During this period it was extremely rare that literature presenting any form of criticism (even in mild forms) of the government could get past the official censors. According to Kinfe Abraham, the only reason Oromay could get published was a feud between Mengistu and Fikre Selassie Wogderess. However, just 24 hours after its release the government banned the novel. All copies were removed from book shops. Confiscated copies of the book were turned into pulp at the Wenji sugar plant. Possession of the Oromay became dangerous, as owners were subjected to government harassment. But some 500 copies had already been sold before the ban had been issued and the book continued to be copied through xerox machines.

Baalu Girma was fired from his job. Some months later he "disappeared". It is generally believed that his disappearance was linked to the publishing of Oromay. In 2025, the first complete English translation was published.

== Plot ==
The story is narrated in the third person by a journalist named Tsegaye who is also the main character in story. He is sent to Asmara, Eritrea, as propaganda minister of the Red Star campaign, an effort to defeat the rising insurgency in the area by a combination of economic and military campaigns. He arrives in Asmara in the evening and goes out to tour the city and make a documentary to be aired that same day. During his tour, he notices the strain caused by the insurgency on the local population, which is suffering from lack of food and fuel. Nonetheless, he attempts to portray an image of a resilient society that stands for peace and unification. He goes to a reception where he meets Fiameta Gila and falls in love with her. He also meets Selay Berhe, who is a double agent with EPLF/Shabia, and is the chief of a cell operating in Asmara going by the code name of Oromay. He has had previous experience with Fiameta, and is not happy when she approaches Tsegaye during the reception.
