= National Educational Assessment and Examination Agency =

Ethiopian government agency

- የሀገር አቀፍ የትምህርት ምዘናና ፈተናዎች ኤጀንሲ

Agency overview
- Formed: 2000
- Headquarters: King George VI Street, Arada, Addis Ababa, Ethiopia
- Agency executive: Wendosen Eyesuswork
- Website: Official website (archived March 30, 2023)

The Ethiopian National Educational Assessment and Examination Agency (Amharic: የሀገር አቀፍ የትምህርት ምዘናና ፈተናዎች ኤጀንሲ; NEAEA) is a government agency responsible for conducting and inspection of national learning process of grade 4th and 8th since 2000, and grade 8th and 12th since 2010. It was established by Council of Ministers under Proclamation No.260/2012. Its office is located in King George VI Street, in Arada district of Addis Ababa.

== Task ==
National Educational Assessment and Examination Agency (NEAEA) is responsible for conduct national exams in Ethiopia for grade 10th and 12th. The Council of Ministers established NEAEA under Proclamation No.260/2012. The Regulation, unless the context otherwise requires:

1. "national examination" means a nationwide exam which is administered on the basis of the national education and training policy and curricula

2/ "exam adminisiration" includes the process of registration of examinees, preparation. printing, conducting and correction of exam, consolidation of exam results and declarineans g and cetiying same

3/ "region" moans any state referred to in Article 47(1) of the Constitution of the Federal Democratic Republic of Ethiopia and includes the Addis Ababa and Dire Dawa city administrations;

4/ "Ministry" means the Ministry of Education

5/ any expression in the masculine gender includes the feminine.

== Criticism ==
In March 2022, Amhara Regional Government Education Bureau sent a team to the agency to request an explanation from the Ministry of Education about grading "errors" in the national examination. 20,000 complaints have been filed against the result of the grade 12 leaving examination, in which the government selects students to join 43 universities across the country. The agency claimed 559 students were affected due to what is called "grading problem", and still not fixed. The region said in North Wollo Zone, 679 students out of 42 schools were affected by these irregularities and failed to university entrance exam.

== See also ==
- Ethiopian General Secondary Education Certificate Examination
