= Bewketu Seyoum =

Ethiopian writer and poet

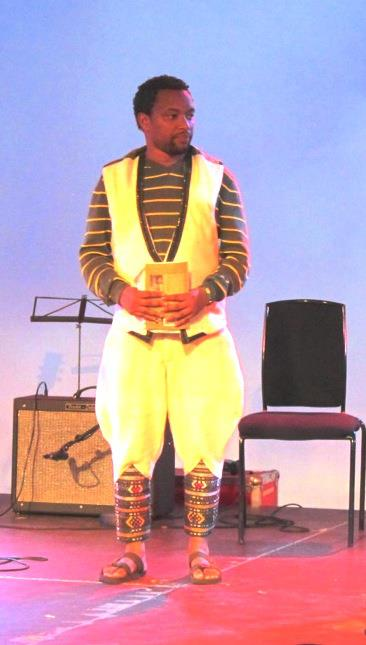
- Seyoum presenting his work
- Born: Ethiopia
- Citizenship: Ethiopian
- Education: Addis Ababa University
- Occupations: Writer; poet
- Writing career
- Language: Amharic; English
- Notable works: Megbat ena Mewtat; Enkilf ena Edme; Newari Alba Gojowoch; Ke Amen Bashager
- Website: www.bewketuseyoum.com

Bewketu Seyoum (Ge'ez: በዕውቀቱ ስዩም) is an Ethiopian writer and poet from Debre Markos of Ethiopia. He studied psychology at Addis Ababa University and published his first collection of poems, Nwari Alba Gojowoch (Unmanned Houses) in 2000, a year after graduating. Since then, he has published two further poetry collections and two novels, and has narrated short stories on CD. In 2008, he received the best young writer award of Ethiopia from the President. Some of his poetry has appeared in Modern Poetry in Translation, The Big Green Issue (2008), and Callaloo (2011).

== Works ==
- Newari Alba Gojowoch (Ge'ez: ኗሪ አልባ ጎጆዎች) (Unmanned Houses), 2000
- Berari (Ge'ez: በራሪ ቅጠሎች) (Flying Leaves), 2004
- Yesat Dar Hasaboch (Ge'ez: የእሳት ዳር ሃሳቦች) (Fireside meditations), 2009
- In Search of Fat (Ge'ez: ሀሰሳ ስጋ), 2012
- Enkilf ena Edme (Ge'ez: እንቅልፍ እና እድሜ)
- Megbat ena Mewtat (Ge'ez: መግባት እና መውጣት)
- Ke Amen Bashager (Ge'ez: ከአሜን ባሻገር), 2015
- Yemaleda Dibab (Ge'ez: የማለዳ ድባብ), 2017
- Adam-El (Ge'ez: አዳምኤል), 2020

== Critical responses ==
Honored as Ethiopian Best Novelist of the Year in 2008 and Best Young Author in 2009, he is widely regarded as one of the leading poets of his generation and is well-known for his humor writing and comedic performance.

== Personal life ==
Although Bewketu Seyoum was born into a religious family, he is often heard saying that he is a non-believer.
