= Azeb Amha =

Linguist

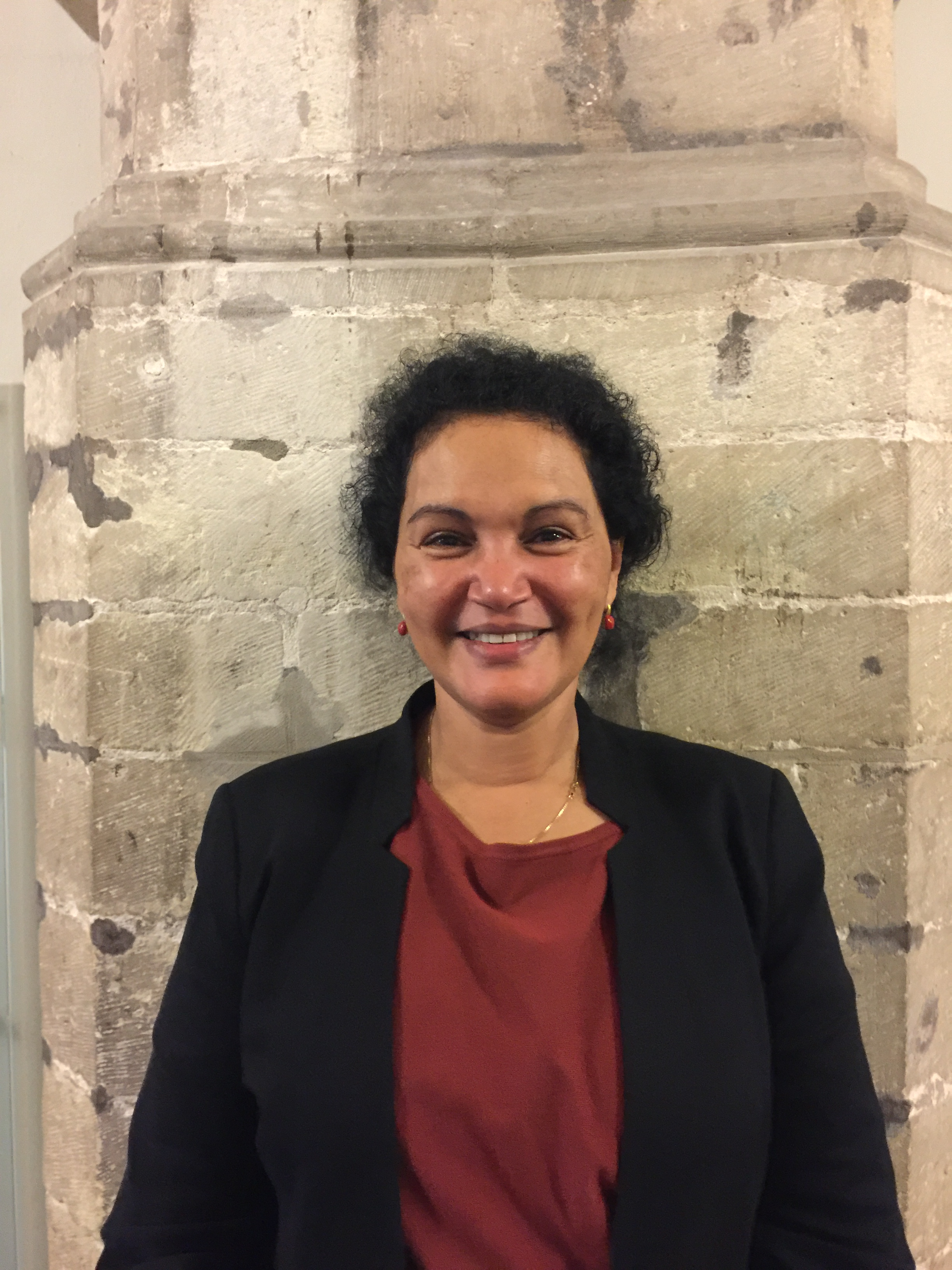
- Amha (2022)
- Born: 1967 (age 58–59); Ethiopian Empire
- Occupation: Linguist

Academic background
- Education: Addis Ababa University, Leiden University

Academic work
- Institutions: Leiden University
- Main interests: morphology and syntax of Afroasiatic languages

Azeb Amha (Amharic: አዜብ አምሃ, born 1967) is an Ethiopian linguist working on the morphology and syntax of Afroasiatic languages, with a special focus on Omotic languages. A senior researcher at the African Studies Center Leiden, Azeb is co-editor of the international Journal of African Languages and Linguistics (with Felix Ameka) and member of the board of the Dutch Society for African Studies (NVAS).

After undergraduate studies at Addis Ababa University in Ethiopia, Azeb obtained her PhD degree from Leiden University. Her thesis, a comprehensive grammar of the Maale language of South-West Ethiopia, was hailed as "an example of descriptive linguistics at its best". Her broad-ranging work since then has involved research on and audio-visual documentation of the linguistic and cultural heritage of the Oyda, Zargulla and Wolaitta peoples, whose languages belong to the Omotic branch of the Afro-Asiatic language family.

In 2007, her research on language endangerment and audiovisual documentation (with Maarten Mous and Anne-Christie Hellenthal) was one of 7 finalists for the Academische Jaarprijs, and in 2016, she was awarded a competitive research grant for a three year project of the Endangered Languages Documentation Project for the linguistic and ethnographic documentation of endangered cultural practices of the Zargulla people in South-West Ethiopia. Her collection on house construction and farming among the Zargula people is available in the repository of the Endangered Languages Archive.

== Key publications ==
- Amha, Azeb. 1996. 'Tone-accent and prosodic domains in Wolaitta'. Studies in African Linguistics, 25(2). 111–138.
- Amha, Azeb. 2001. The Maale Language (CNWS Publications 99). Leiden: Leiden University.
- Amha, Azeb & Dimmendaal, Gerrit J. 2006. 'Converbs in an African perspective'. In Ameka, Felix K. & Dench, Alan & Evans, Nicholas (eds.), Catching Language. The standing challenge of grammar writing, 393–440. Berlin: Mouton de Gruyter.
- Amha, Azeb. 2012. 'Omotic'. In Frajzyngier, Zygmunt & Shay, Erin (eds.), The Afroasiatic Languages, 423–504. Cambridge: Cambridge University Press.
- Amha, Azeb. 2013. Directives to humans and to domestic animals – the imperative and some interjections in Zargulla. In: Marie-Claude Simeone-Senelle and Martine Vanhove (eds.), Proceedings of the 5th International Conference on Cushitic and Omotic Languages, Paris, 16–18 April 2008. Cologne: Köppe (ISBN 978-3-89645-488-1).
- Amha, Azeb. "Complex predicates in Zargulla." In Wiesbaden explorations in Ethiopian Linguistics: Complex Predicates, finiteness and interrogativity, pp. 91–119. Harrassowitz Verlag, 2014.
- Azeb Amha. 2017. Commands in Wolaitta. In Aikhenvald, Alexandra Y. and R. M. W Dixon (eds.) Commands: a cross-linguistic typology, pp. 283 –300. Oxford: Oxford University Press.
- Amha, Azeb. "The morphosyntax of negation in Zargulla." LOT Occasional Series 13 (2009): 199-220.
- Amha, Azeb, James Slotta and Hannah S. Sarvasy. 2021. Singing the individual: Name tunes in Oyda and Yopno. Frontiers in Psychology, 12:667599. Doi:10.3389/fpsyg.2021.667599
- Ameka, Felix and Azeb Amha. 2022. "Research on language and culture in Africa". In: Nico Nassenstein & Svenja Völkel (eds.) Approaches to Language and Culture, pp. 339–383. [Volume 1 of book series Anthropological Linguistics”] Berlin: Mouton de Gruyter.
