= Sinknesh Ejigu =

Ethiopian politician (born 1956)

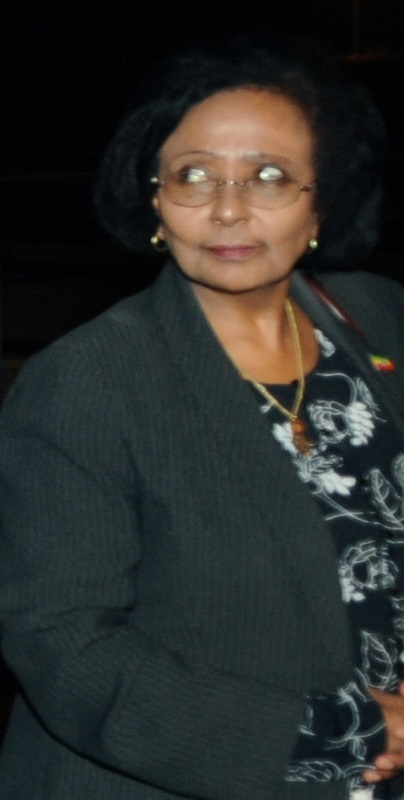

Ethiopian Ambassador to Brazil, Argentina and Chile
- In office 2014–2018

Minister of Mines
- In office 2010–2014
- Succeeded by: Tolossa Shagi Moti

Member of the House of Peoples' Representatives
- Constituency: Dendi

Personal details
- Born: 1956 (age 69–70)
- Party: Oromo Peoples' Democratic Organization
- Education: Addis Ababa University (BSc); University of East Anglia (MSc)

Sinknesh Ejigu Wolde-Mariam (born 1956) is an Ethiopian politician, chemist, businesswoman and diplomat.

== Biography ==
She was born in Ambo west of Addis Ababa to a family of eight in 1956. Her father, Ejigu Wolde-Mariam, was a military officer so the family moved around Ethiopia a lot. Both her parents did not have much education but they encouraged their children to seek a strong one. She attended several different primary schools. At the Princess Tenagnework Comprehensive High School, an Indian teacher encouraged her interest in science and chemistry. Ejigu enrolled at Addis Ababa University in 1973, where she was assigned to the mathematics department but transferred to the chemistry department in her second year.

In the midst of the revolution in 1974, she was sent to the farmland to work alongside peasants. Due to the hardness of the situation in the country at the time, she dropped out of university to work teaching physical science. Later, she found work at the Ethiopian Pharmaceutical Manufacturing as a chemical analyst. After quitting her job in pharmaceuticals, she received a Bachelor of Science in Chemistry from Addis Ababa University in 1980. Ejigu became a junior geoscience analyst in the laboratory of the Ethiopian Geological Survey. She earned a master's degree in Analytical Chemistry in 1988 at the University of East Anglia. After taking her degree, she joined the Water and Geothermal Analysis Department in the Ministry of Mines and was soon promoted to head of the department, rare for a woman at the time. She became Deputy Minister of the Ministry of Mines and Energy in June 1998.

She is a member of the Oromo Peoples' Democratic Organization and was a member of the House of Peoples' Representatives representing Dendi, Western Shewa, Oromia. She was appointed Minister of Mines in the Cabinet of Ethiopia in 2010. Her main role as minister was to discover the basic geoscience data of Ethiopia, to promote mineral and petroleum exploration, and grant permits to investors seeking to make money in mining. Due to her background in science, she was able to directly manage the scientific projects themselves and not just the personnel of the ministry. Throughout Ethiopia's history the government typically pursued agriculture for development, but it began focusing more on mining when Ejignu was appointed. In 2012, she was involved in a dispute with the Hong Kong-based company PetroTrans after she revoked their license since they were taking too long on a project.

In 2014, she became Ethiopian Ambassador to Brazil, Argentina and Chile. Ejignu is also a Director of Ethiopian Electric Power Corporation.

== Personal life ==
She is married to a man she met at Addis Ababa University and has two children.
