= Hama Tuma =

Ethiopian poet and writer

Hama Tuma (born May 25, 1949) is an Ethiopian poet and writer in Amharic and English.

== Biography ==
Tuma, born in Addis Ababa, Ethiopia, studied Law at Addis Ababa University and became an advocate for democracy and justice. His activism has resulted in bans by three different Ethiopian governments, a political response such further sharpened a satirical edge in his work and earned him a reputation as one of Ethiopia’s great contemporary satirists. He has travelled widely but currently lives in Paris with his wife and daughter. His books have been translated into English, Italian, French, and Hebrew.

== Bibliography ==
- Kedada Chereka (novel)
- Of Spades and Ethiopians (poetry; Free Ethiopian Press, 1991)
- The Case of the Socialist Witchdoctor and Other Stories (short stories; Heinemann, 1993)
- Eating an American and Other Poems (1995)
- African Absurdities: Politically Incorrect Articles (essays; First Publish, 2002)
- Give Me a Dog's Life Any Day: African Absurdities II (essays; Trafford Publishing, 2004)
- The Case of the Criminal Walk and Other Stories (Outskirts Press, May 2006)
- Habeshigna #1 & #2 (two collections of poetry in Amharic, 2006^)
- Democratic Cannibalism: African Absurdities III (Infinity Publishing, 2007)
- Why Don't They Eat Coltan? African Absurdities IV (Infinity Publishing, 2010)
- The Homeless Prime Minister: African Absurdities V (Infinity Publishing, 2014)
