= Ethiopian Academy of Sciences =

National scientific academy of Ethiopia, est. 2010

The Ethiopian Academy of Sciences is a national academy founded on April 10, 2010. Pediatrician Demissie Habte served as its inaugural president. The founding class of fellows included 50 people across the natural and social sciences. It was started by researchers from Addis Ababa University with support from the Royal Society until 2011. Its founding executive director is plant ecophysiologist Masresha Fetene. Brhane Gebrekidan, an agronomist, is vice president. By 2022, only 9 percent of its fellows were women, the smallest percentage among academies in Africa. It is a member of the Network of African Science Academies.

== List of presidents ==
- Demissie Habte, 2010
- Tsige Gebre-Mariam, 2019
