= Felix Ameka =

Ghanaian linguist

Felix K. Ameka
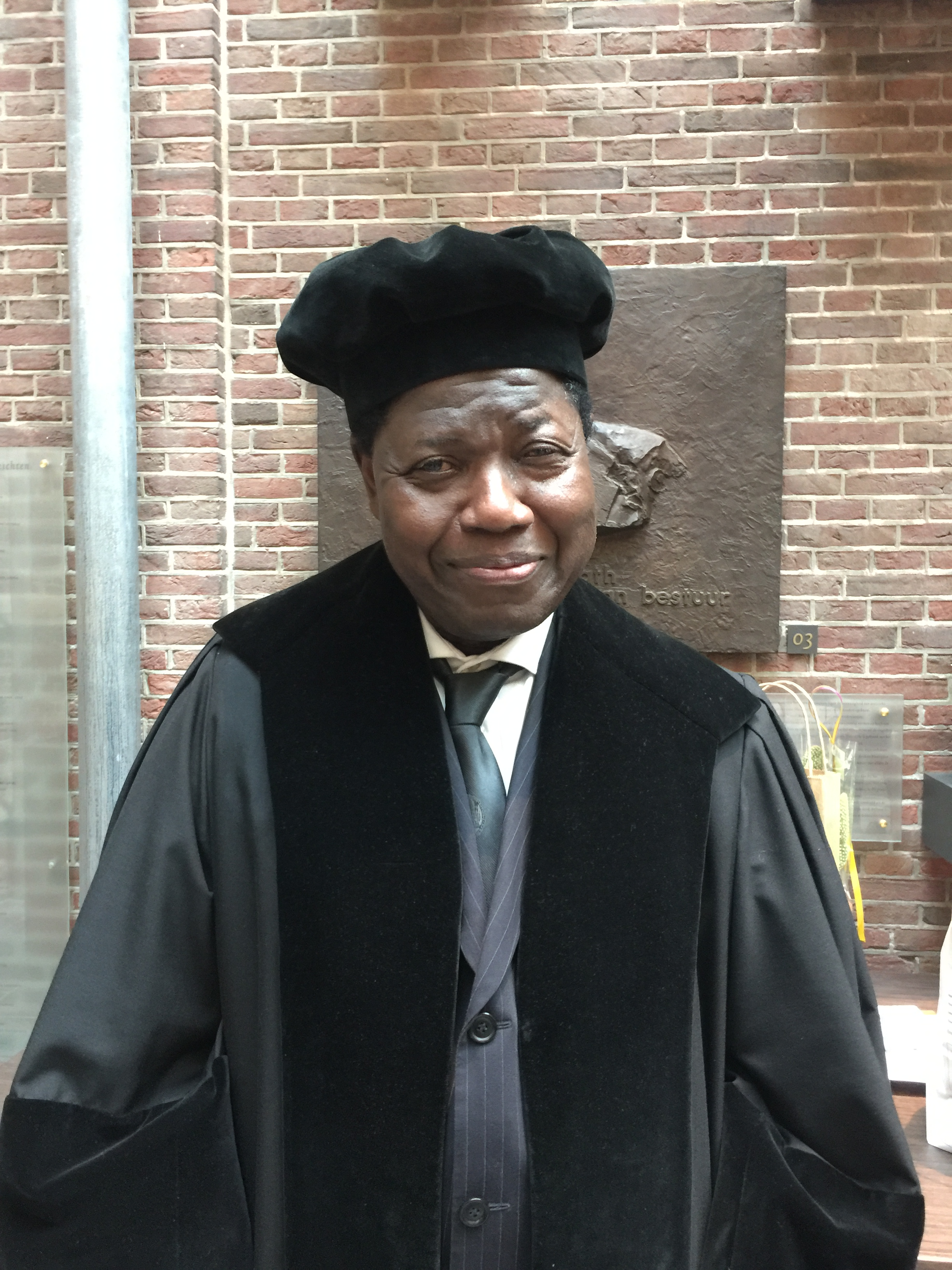
- Ameka (2022)
- Born: 1957 (age 68–69)
- Occupation: Linguist

Academic background
- Education: Australian National University

Academic work
- Institutions: Leiden University
- Main interests: linguistic typology, anthropological linguistics, pragmatics

Felix Ameka (born 1957) is a linguist working on the intersection of grammar, meaning and culture. His empirical specialisation is on West-African languages. He is currently professor of Ethnolinguistic Diversity and Vitality at Leiden University and teaches in the departments of Linguistics, African Languages and cultures, and African Studies. In recognition of his pioneering work on cross-cultural semantics and his long-standing research ties with Australian universities, he was elected as a Corresponding Fellow to the Australian Academy of Humanities in 2019.

After undergraduate training at the University of Ghana, Legon, Ameka received his PhD in 1991 from Australian National University for a dissertation on the semantic, functional, and discourse-pragmatic aspects of the grammar of Ewe. Ameka has made seminal contributions to the cross-linguistic study of interjections, editing a highly influential special issue on 'the universal yet neglected part of speech'. Ameka has pioneered research on the interaction of grammar, culture, and social structure, using the framework of Natural Semantic Metalanguage to elucidate cultural scripts and interactional resources. A long-term research associate at the Max Planck Institute of Psycholinguistics, Ameka has led a large-scale comparative project on the semantics of locative predicates and contributed to cross-linguistic work on the expression of motion events. With Alan Dench and Nick Evans, he co-edited an influential collection on the art of grammar writing.

Ameka is editor of the Journal of African Languages and Linguistics together with Azeb Amha. Since 2015, Ameka is President of the World Congress of African Linguistics.

In 2021, he was elected member of the Academia Europaea.

== Key publications ==
- Ameka, Felix K. 1991. Ewe. Its Grammatical Constructions and Illucutionary Devices. PhD dissertation, Australian National University.
- Ameka, Felix K. 1992. 'Interjections. The Universal Yet Neglected Part of Speech.' Journal of Pragmatics 18 (2–3): 101–18.
- Ameka, Felix K., Alan Dench, and Nicholas Evans, eds. 2006. Catching Language. The Standing Challenge of Grammar Writing. Berlin: Mouton de Gruyter.
- Ameka, Felix K., and Stephen C. Levinson. 2007. 'Introduction: The Typology and Semantics of Locative Predicates: Posturals, Positionals, and Other Beasts.' Linguistics 45 (5part6): 847–871.
- Ameka, Felix K., and Mary Esther Kropp Dakubu, eds. 2008. Aspect and Modality in Kwa Languages. Amsterdam/Philadelphia: John Benjamins.
