= Ye'Zareyitu Ethiopia =

Ethiopian weekly newspaper founded in 1952

Ye'Zareyitu Ethiopia (or Yezareytu Ityopya, "Ethiopia Today"; Amharic: የዛሬዪቱ ኢትዮጵያ) was an Amharic language weekly newspaper in Ethiopia founded in 1952. It was also produced in a French language version L'Ethiope d'Aujourd'hui. In 1982 UNESCO recorded the paper as having a circulation of 30,000.

== Notable editors in chief ==
- Baalu Girma
