= The Ethiopian Herald =

Government-owned English-language newspaper published in Ethiopia

- Type: Daily newspaper
- Publisher: Ethiopian Press Agency
- Editor-in-chief: Worku Belachew
- Managing editor: Wakuman Kudama
- Founded: 1943
- Language: English
- Headquarters: Addis Ababa, Ethiopia
- Website: www.ethpress.gov.et/herald/index.php

The Ethiopian Herald is a government-owned English-language newspaper published by the Ethiopian Press Agency, which also publishes the Amharic-language Addis Zemen.

It was launched as a weekly on 3 July 1943. Jan Hoy Simpson, an Englishman, was its first editor. Later editors were from the United States. The first Ethiopian editor was Ato Yacob Wolde Mariam in 1960. It became a daily at the end of 1958, as did Addis Zemen.

== Ownership ==
Ethiopian Press Agency
- Formation: 1940
- Headquarters: Addis Ababa, Ethiopia
- Website: https://press.et/herald/

The Ethiopian Herald is owned by the Ethiopian Press Agency, a public media enterprise operating in Ethiopia, which was established in 1940. It is the sole publisher of the only daily Amharic-language newspaper known as Addis Zemen. The enterprise also publishes The Ethiopian Herald, a daily newspaper, except on Mondays, in the English language. Among its tabloids are the weeklies Bariisaa in the local Oromo language and Al-Alem in the international Arabic languages. The agency has yet another bi-monthly magazine, known as Zemen in Amharic. With a current staff of more than 300, the Ethiopian Press Agency runs its own business affairs through its own-generated incomes.
