= Kinfe Abraham =

Ethiopian academic (1950-2007)

- ከንፈ አብርሃም
- Born: 20 October 1950; Gondar, Begemder Province, Ethiopian Empire
- Died: 8 November 2007 (aged 57)
- Citizenship: Ethiopians
- Occupations: Academic, Politician
- Title: President of the Ethiopian International Institute for Peace and Development, Professor
- Children: one son, one daughter

Academic background
- Education: Haile Selassie University, UCLA, Uppsala University

Academic work
- Notable works: From race to class: links and parallels in African and Black American protest expression Politics of Black nationalism: from Harlem to Soweto; The missing millions: why and how Africa is underdeveloped

Kinfe Abraham (Tigrinya: ከንፈ አብርሃም, kinəfä abərəhamə; 20 October 1950 – 8 November 2007) was an Ethiopian academic and politician nicknamed 'Mr Quagmire'. He was president of the Ethiopian International Institute for Peace and Development, as well as president of Horn of Africa Democracy and Development.

== Personal life ==
Kinfe Abraham was born on 20 October 1950 in the historic town of Adwa, Tigray, Ethiopia, to Abraham Shale and Birrnesh Wasyihun. He completed his primary and secondary education at Atse Fasiledas School in Gondar. Shortly afterwards, Abraham left for the Netherlands, where he did his graduate work. He received a master's in industrial management at the Research Institute for Management Science in 1973. Upon returning to Ethiopia, he worked for the International Labour Organization. Shortly after the Derg assumed power, he left for Sweden accepting an international post with the Swedish International Development Agency, where he worked for the next 10 years. Kinfe received his PhD from Uppsala University in Sweden and UCLA in 1982, and was awarded a Fulbright Scholarship in 1983.

== Career ==
Abraham afterwards held a number of positions at the United Nations and in the Intergovernmental Authority on Development. He concentrated on foreign policy issues of interest to Ethiopia, serving in the mid-nineties as the Ethiopian Prime Minister's Special Envoy to Somalia as well as to the African Great Lakes region. He also acted as a mediator in Sudan.

The Universal Federation of Peace and the Interreligious and International Federation for World Peace honored Abraham as Ambassador for Peace at a ceremony held at Sheraton Alexandria (Virginia) in the United States. Abraham was nominated and selected for this great honor on the basis of his firm dedication to the peaceful settlement of conflicts as indispensable contributors to economic growth, development and democracy as exemplified by his involvement in various peace efforts and the embodiment of his scholarly contributions to African studies and developmental issues.

He died after a brief illness, and was survived by his wife and one son. He was described by the Africa World Journal as one of the leading thinkers of Africa.

== Published writings ==
- Somalia Calling, NINA Press, Uppsala, 2002. ISBN 9789163119835
- Ethiopia: From Empire to Federation, NINA Press, Uppsala, 2001. ISBN 9789163119828
- Ethiopia: The Dynamics of Economic Reforms, Nina Press, Uppsala, 2001. ISBN 9789163119811
- Peace Under Assault, EIIPD Press, Addis Ababa, 1999.
- The Battle of Histories: The Conflict Between the Unitary and Pluralist States, Magnussa Press, AWP New Jersey, US, 1997.
- The Apartheid Axis: A Cultural and Political History of the Black People, 1997.
- The Missing Millions: Why and How Africa is Underdeveloped, Africa World Press, New Jersey, US, 1995. ISBN 9780865433533
- Ethiopia: From Bullets to the Ballot Box, Red Sea Press, AWP New Jersey, US, 1994. ISBN 0932415792.
- Statistical Briefings of the Education Sector Support, Stockholm, SIDA 1993/94.
- Ethiopia: The Challenge of the 20th Century Education, SIDA, 1993.
- Black People, White People: A cultural History of Race Relations, AWP, US - Forthcoming, 1993.
- Swedish Education Assistance, SIDA, 1992.
- Politics of Black Nationalism from Harlem to Sweto, Africa World Press US, 1991.
- Statistical Digest, Stockholm, SIDA 1991/92.
- Statistical Digest, Stockholm, SIDA 1989/90.
- Professional Training for Service in the Third World, Mag. Press, 1984.
- From Race to Class, Grass Roots Publishers, 1983.
- Handbook of Professional Terminology, Cosmic Press, 1983.
