= Addis Ababa University =

National university in Addis Ababa, Ethiopia

- አዲስ አበባ ዩኒቨርሲቲ
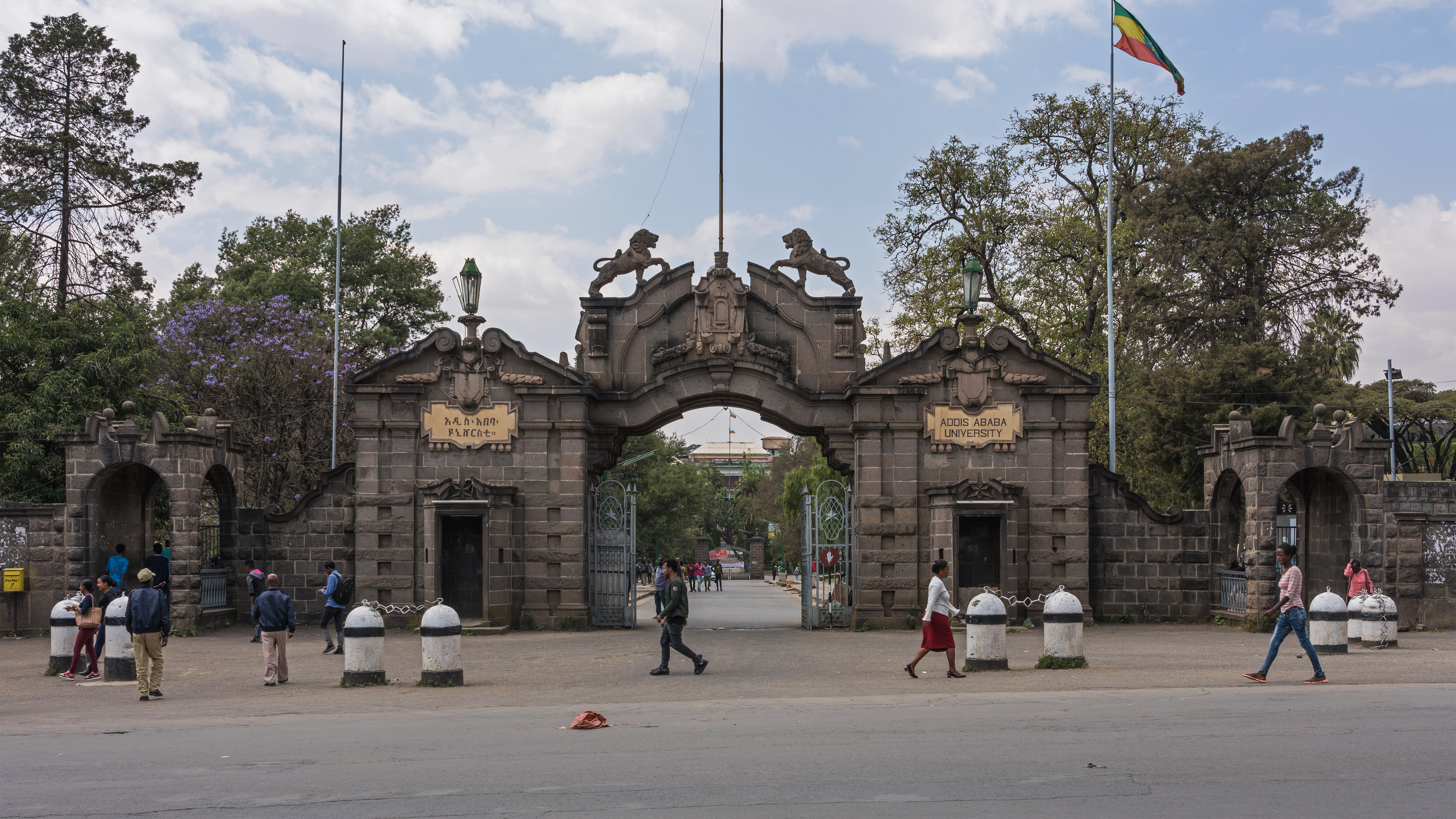
- AAU in 2018
- Former names: University College of Addis Ababa (1950–1962); Haile Selassie I University (1962–1975)
- Motto: ኵሎ አመክሩ ወዘሠናየ አጽንዑ (1 ተሰሎንቄ 5:21) (Geʽez)
- Motto in English: "Prove all things; hold fast that which is good" (1 Thessalonians 5:21)
- Type: National university
- Established: 20 March 1950; 76 years ago
- President: Tassew Woldehanna
- Students: 48,673 (2013/14)
- Location: Addis Ababa, Ethiopia; 9°2′48″N 38°45′33″E
- Campus: Addis Ababa (14 campus, including main)
- Website: aau.edu.et

Addis Ababa University (Amharic: አዲስ አበባ ዩኒቨርሲቲ; AAU) is a national university located in Addis Ababa, Ethiopia. It is the oldest university in Ethiopia. AAU has thirteen campuses. Twelve of these are situated in Addis Ababa, and one is located in Bishoftu, about 45 kilometres (28 mi) away. AAU has several associated research institutions including the Institute of Ethiopian Studies. The Ministry of Education admits qualified students to AAU based on their score on the Ethiopian University Entrance Examination (EUEE).

== History ==
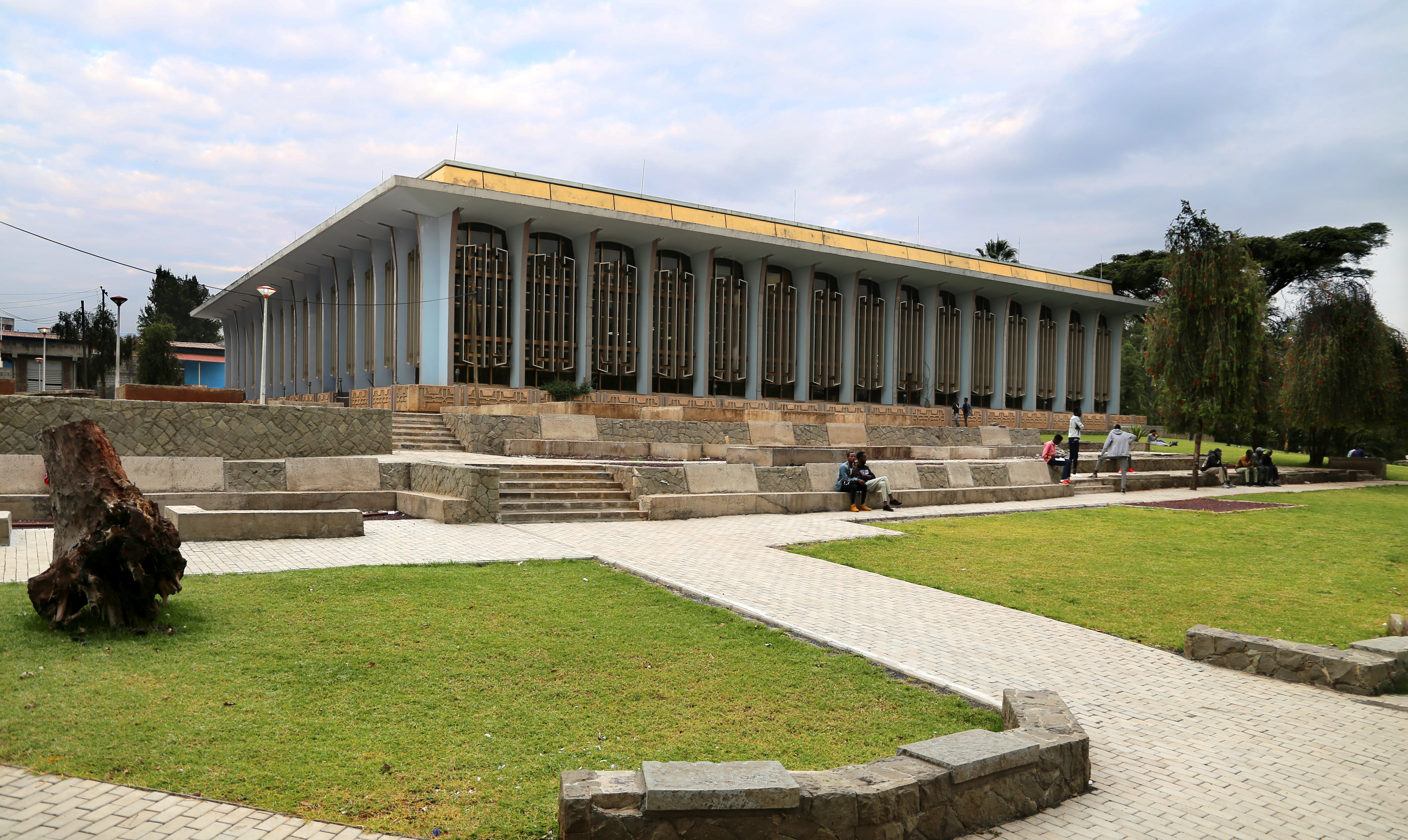
J. F. Kennedy Library of Addis Ababa University

The origins of AAU are a two-year college established on 20 March 1950 by the Jesuit Lucien Matte, at the appeal of His Majesty Emperor Haile Selassie I. It began operations the following year. Over the following two years an affiliation with the University of London and University of Oxford was developed. Africans from various parts of the continent would receive free scholarships through programs subsidized by the Organisation of African Unity for higher learning. AAU was also known for sending its students abroad for an extended interpersonal educational experience, and having those students return with the exemplary standards of the international community.

The nucleus of AAU was formed with the establishment of the University College of Addis Ababa (UCAA) in 1950. UCAA, which initially consisted of the Faculties of Arts and Science, became a fully fledged college when it was chartered in 1954. In 1955, the Building College was opened. In February 1961, these various colleges and the Theological College were brought together to form the Haile Selassie University. Emperor Haile Selassie I gave his Guenete Leul Palace to serve as the administration building and main campus. He had abandoned the palace, where a number of his ministers and favorites were killed in the wake of the abortive coup d'état in 1960, in favor of the new Jubilee Palace. Following the 1974 revolution, the university was briefly renamed University of Ethiopia (National University) before it came to assume its present name, AAU, in 1975. In the wake of the revolution, AAU was closed for two years and students and staff were drafted into what was known as the Development through Cooperation Campaign (zemecha), designed to raise the awareness of the rural population in the spirit of the revolution. The university offered its first Master's programs in 1979 and its first PhD programs in 1987.

=== Administration ===
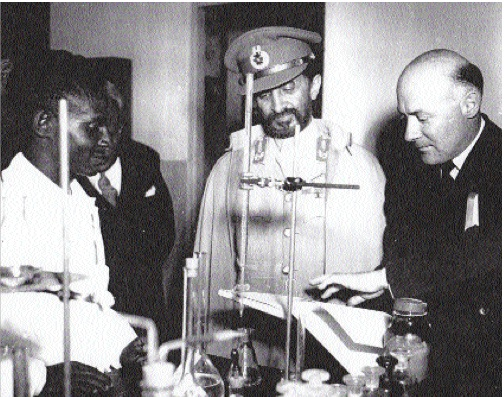
Emperor Haile Selassie (center) and French Canadian Jesuit Fr. Lucien Matte, SJ (right) at the university, 1951

Until 1974 the charter provided for a governance structure in the following descending order or authority: Chancellor (the Emperor himself); the Board of Governors, composed of ministers and members of the royal family; and the Faculty Council, made up of the university officers, deans, directors and elected members. The Faculty later became the Senate. In 1977, Duri Mohammed was appointed president of AAU. Under his leadership the academy was preserved and even saw its resurgence despite the turbulent times amid the Ethiopian inserruction. The AAU also lost its relative autonomy when it was brought under the Commission for Higher Education, which came to exercise administrative jurisdiction over all institutions of higher learning. In 1993, AAU was placed under the Ministry of Education by a government proclamation. The incoming transitional government appointed Duri Mohammed as president once again, and a purging of 42 staff members which included Asrat Woldeyes and former president Alemayehu Teferra ensued.

== Influence ==
University rankings

Global – Overall
- ARWU World: 601–700 (2023)
- QS World: 851–900 (2024)
- USNWR Global: =573 (2023)

Over and above their academic pursuits, AAU students have been actively engaged in community service (such as conducting literacy programs) and political struggle, particularly in the years before the 1974 revolution. In the late 1960s and early 1970s, students were required to do a year of national service under the Ethiopia University Service program. University teachers and students were instrumental in exposing the hidden 1973 famine and launching the first famine relief program. The Ethiopian Student Movement, of which the university was the birthplace and main venue, played a pivotal role in bringing about the revolution. Almost all leaders of the political organizations that were active in the revolutionary years or are in power now had their political formation inside the university. In 2013/2014, there were 33,940 undergraduate students, 13,000 graduate students, and 1,733 PhD students, making a total student body of 48,673.

== Campuses and colleges ==
=== Colleges ===
- College of Biological Engineering
- College of Social Sciences
- College of Humanities, Language Studies, Journalism and communication
- College of Development Studies
- College of Business and Economics
- College of Law and Governance Studies
- College of Education and Behavioral Studies
- College of Natural and Computational Sciences
- Skunder Boghossian College of Performing and Visual Arts
- College of Veterinary Medicine and Agriculture
- College of Health Science

=== Research and teaching institutes ===
- Academy of Ethiopian Languages and Cultures
- Addis Ababa Institute of Technology
- Aklilu Lemma Institute of Pathobiology
- Ethiopian Institute of Architecture, Building Construction and City Development
- Ethiopian Institute of Water Resources
- Institute of Biotechnology
- Institute of Educational Research
- Institute of Ethiopian Studies
- Institute of Geophysics, Space Science and Astronomy
- Institute of Peace and Security Studies
- Horn of Africa Regional Center and Environment Network
- Institute of Development and Policy Research/IDPR/

=== Schools ===
- Alle School of Fine Arts and Design
- School of Allied Health Sciences
- School of Commerce
- School of Earth Sciences (Geology)
- School of Information Science
- School of Journalism and Communications
- School of Medicine
- School of Pharmacy
- School of Public health
- School of Social Work
- Yared School of Music
- Yoftahe Nigussie School of Theatrical Arts

== Notable dropouts ==
- Isaias Afwerki abandoned his studies in 1966 and traveled to Kassala, Sudan to join the Eritrean Liberation Front.
- Meles Zenawi left the university in 1975 to join the Tigray People's Liberation Front and fight against the Derg (the Mengistu Haile Mariam-led military government in Ethiopia).

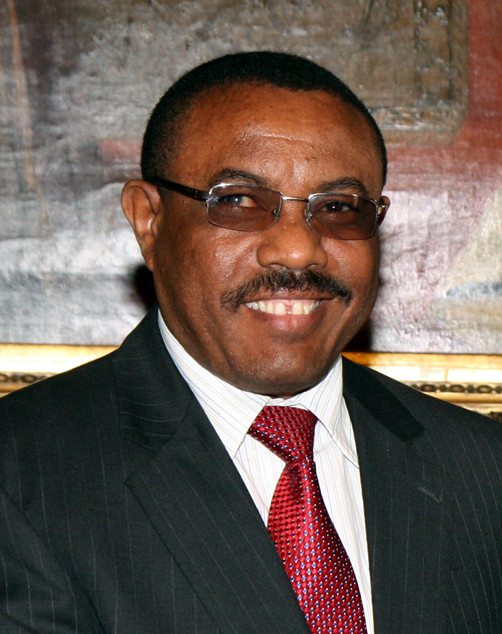
Hailemariam Desalegn (former prime minister of Ethiopia 2012–2018)

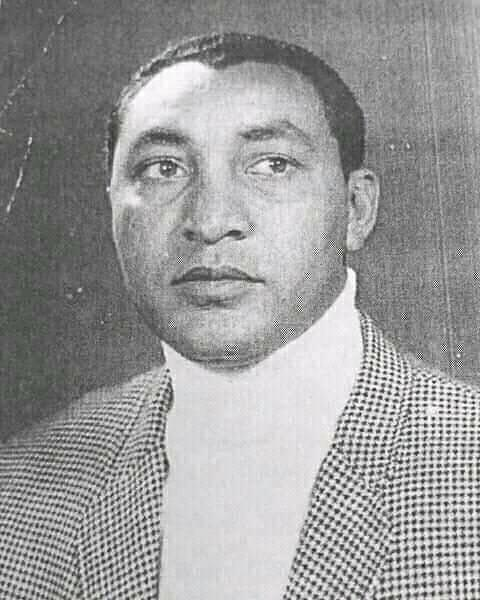
Baalu Girma, an Ethiopian journalist, writer and novelist

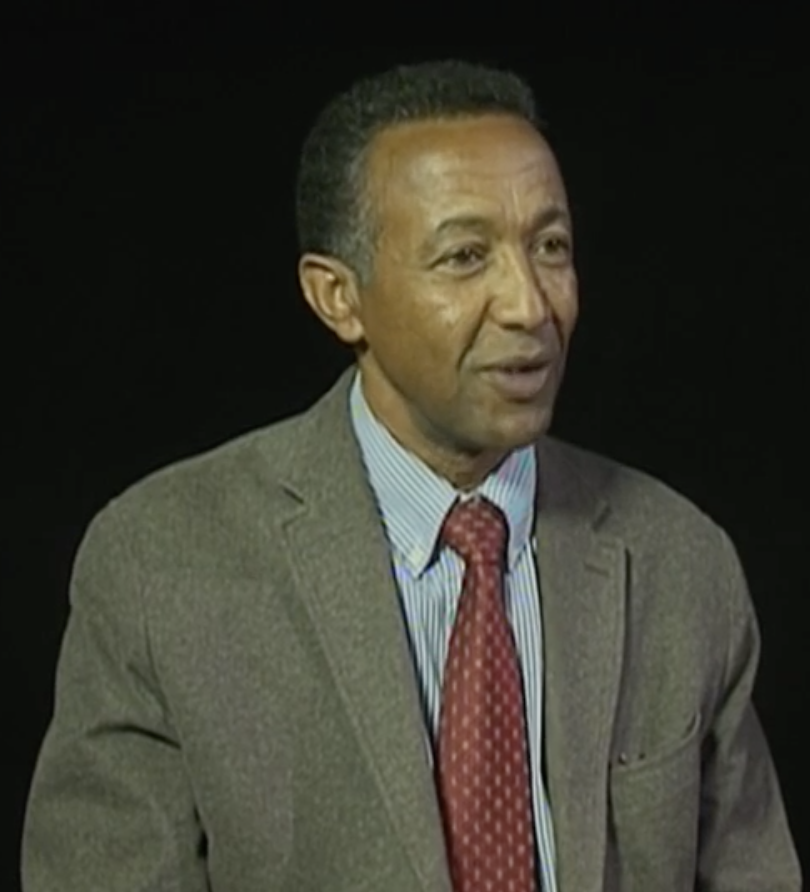
Yohannes Haile-Selassie, an Ethiopian paleoanthropologist

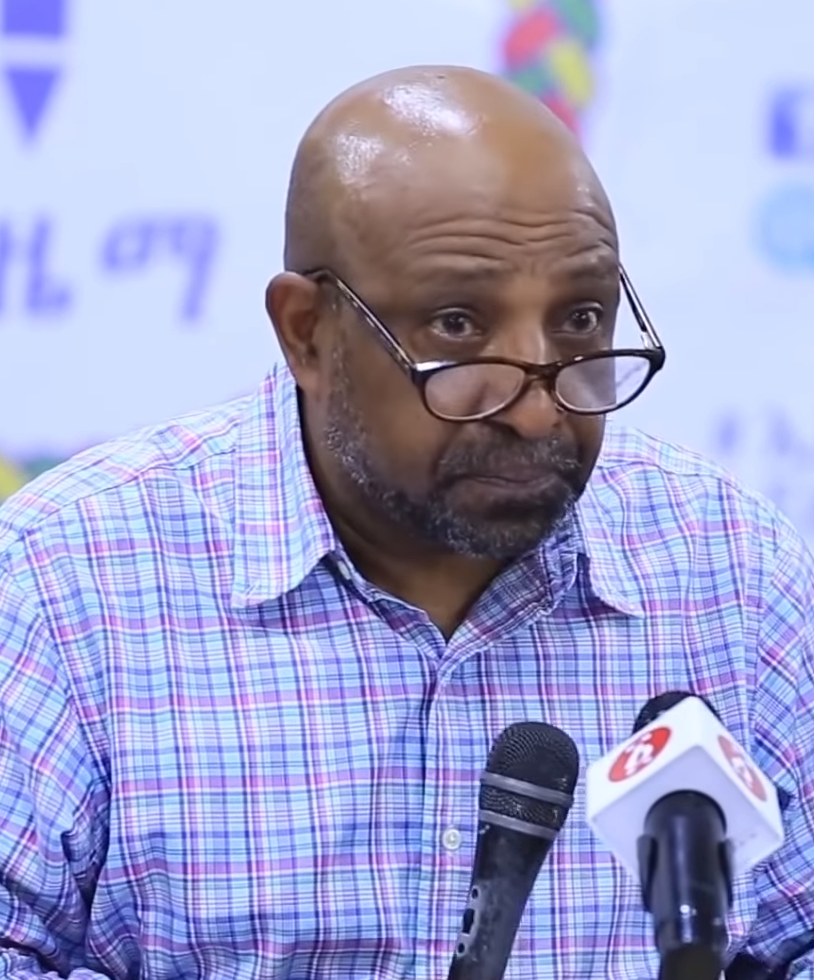
Berhanu Nega, current Minister of Education

== Notable alumni ==
=== Politicians ===
- Hailemariam Desalegn
- Abiy Ahmed
- Rupiah Banda
- Mustafa Mohoumed Omer
- Ali Abdo
- Murad Abdulhadi

=== Physicists ===
- Mulugeta Bekele

=== Historians ===
- Taddesse Tamrat
- Kinfe Abraham
- Merid Wolde Aregay
- Bahru Zewde
- Mohammed Hassen

=== Biologists ===
- Tewolde Berhan Gebre Egziabher
- Legesse Wolde-Yohannes
- Sebsebe Demissew
- Segenet Kelemu
- Masresha Fetene

=== Engineers ===
- Simegnew Bekele

=== Chemists ===
- Sinknesh Ejigu

=== Linguists ===
- Azeb Amha

=== Pharmacologists ===
- Eleni Aklillu

=== Anthropologists ===
- Berhane Asfaw
- Yohannes Haile-Selassie
- Zeresenay Alemseged

=== Artists ===
- Kidist Hailu Degaffe

=== Authors ===
- Hama Tuma
- Sebhat Gebre-Egziabher
- Baalu Girma
- Bewketu Seyoum

=== Economists ===
- Duri Mohammed
- Berhanu Nega

=== Judges ===
- Kemal Bedri

=== Lawyers ===
- Goshu Wolde
- Meaza Ashenafi
- Daniel Bekele
- Birtukan Mideksa
- Getachew Reda
- Abiye Teklemariam
- Awol Allo

=== Linguists ===
- Azeb Amha
- Hirut Woldemariam

=== Physicians ===
- Lia Tadesse
- Yimtubezinash Woldeamanuel

== See also ==
- List of universities and colleges in Ethiopia
- Education in Ethiopia
