= Addis Zemen (newspaper) =

Amharic-language daily newspaper in Ethiopia

- Type: Daily
- Format: Broadsheet
- Founder: Haile Selassie
- Publisher: Ethiopian Press Agency
- Founded: 7 June 1941; 84 years ago
- Political alignment: Pro-government
- Language: Amharic
- Headquarters: Addis Ababa
- Website: Website

Addis Zemen (አዲስ ዘመን; "New Era" in English) is an Ethiopian Amharic newspaper published by the federal government's Ethiopian Press Agency, which also publishes the English-language Ethiopian Herald.

== History and profile ==
The paper was founded by Emperor Haile Selassie following the liberation of the country, and its name refers to the liberation of Ethiopia from Italian colonial rule. The paper was launched as a four-page weekly on 7 June 1941. Its first editor-in-chief was Amde Mikael Desalegn. On 5 May 1946 it became a broadsheet publication and in December 1958 it became a daily newspaper, along with the Ethiopian Herald.

It is based in Addis Ababa and is currently published by the Ethiopian Press Agency. On Sundays, the paper provides its readers with extensive news about children in the country in terms of cultural activities.
