= Ethiopian General Secondary Education Certificate Examination =

National exam in Ethiopia

The Ethiopian General Secondary Education Certificate Examination (EGSECE) is a nationwide exam in Ethiopia that is given to students after final year of secondary school education. Students take EGSECE usually that would eligible to continue eleventh grade or college in preparatory schools. Since 2001, the Ethiopian Secondary Education Certificate is awarded to students who pass the exam.

== Overview ==
The Ethiopian General Secondary Education Certificate Examination is conducted annually for evaluation of competency in 10th grade and awards Ethiopian General Secondary Education Certificate for student who pass the exam. The award was started in 2001. Previously, the Ethiopian School Leaving Certificate (ESLC) awarded until 2003 before replaced by the Ethiopian Higher Education Entrance Examination (EHEEE). Students should submit three items before the exam as follows:

1) Transcript with internal scores from the high school.

2) Ethiopian General Secondary Education Certificate (EGSEC, done after grade 10)

3) Ethiopian University Entrance Examination (EUEE) results or Ethiopian Secondary School Leaving Examination

The second phase of secondary education leads to two field branch that students choose one of them: natural and social science branch. Fields in the Natural Science includes Biology, Chemistry, Mathematics, Physics, while Geography, Social Studies, history in the Social Science. The other general subjects are mandatory to both streams such as English, Physical Education and national and foreign language subjects. And it's scored out of 600 for both natural and social stream

== Recent problems ==
Since 2021, the grade 12 leaving examination has experienced serious catastrophe where many students unprecedentedly scored poor result. In 2022, of the 896,520 students that took the exam, 3.3% scored 50% and above, which is minimum requirement to enter higher education. The percent of students who pass the exam reduced to 3.2% in 2023 with 845,099 students taking the exam.

== See also ==
- National Educational Assessment and Examination Agency
